= Dirmstein =

- Municipality
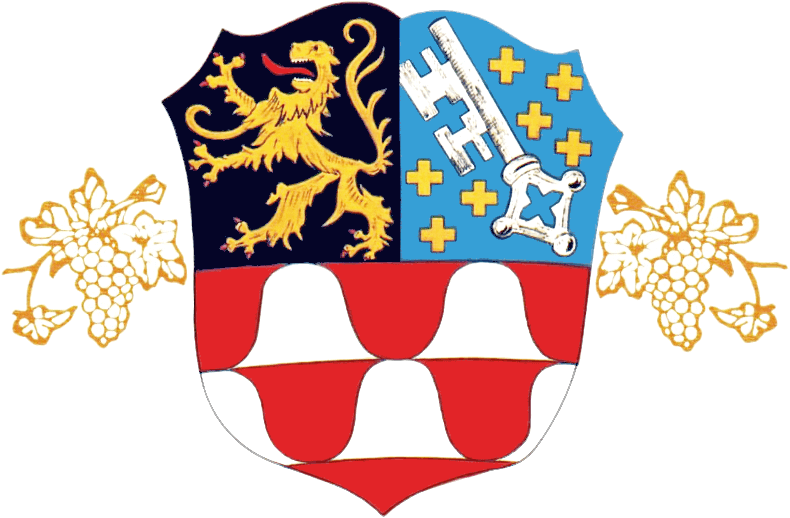
- Coat of arms

- Location of Dirmstein within Bad Dürkheim district
- Interactive map of Dirmstein
- Location within Germany Location within Rhineland-Palatinate
- Coordinates: 49°33′48″N 08°14′51″E
- Country: Germany
- State: Rhineland-Palatinate
- District: Bad Dürkheim
- Municipal assoc.: Leiningerland

Government
  - Mayor (2019–24): Bernd Eberle (FW)

Area
  - Total: 14.68 km^{2} (5.67 sq mi)
- Elevation: 108 m (354 ft)

Population (2025-12-31)
  - Total: 3,010
  - Density: 205/km^{2} (531/sq mi)
- Time zone: UTC+01:00 (CET)
  - Summer (DST): UTC+02:00 (CEST)
- Postal codes: 67246
- Dialling codes: 06238
- Vehicle registration: DÜW
- Website: www.dirmstein.de

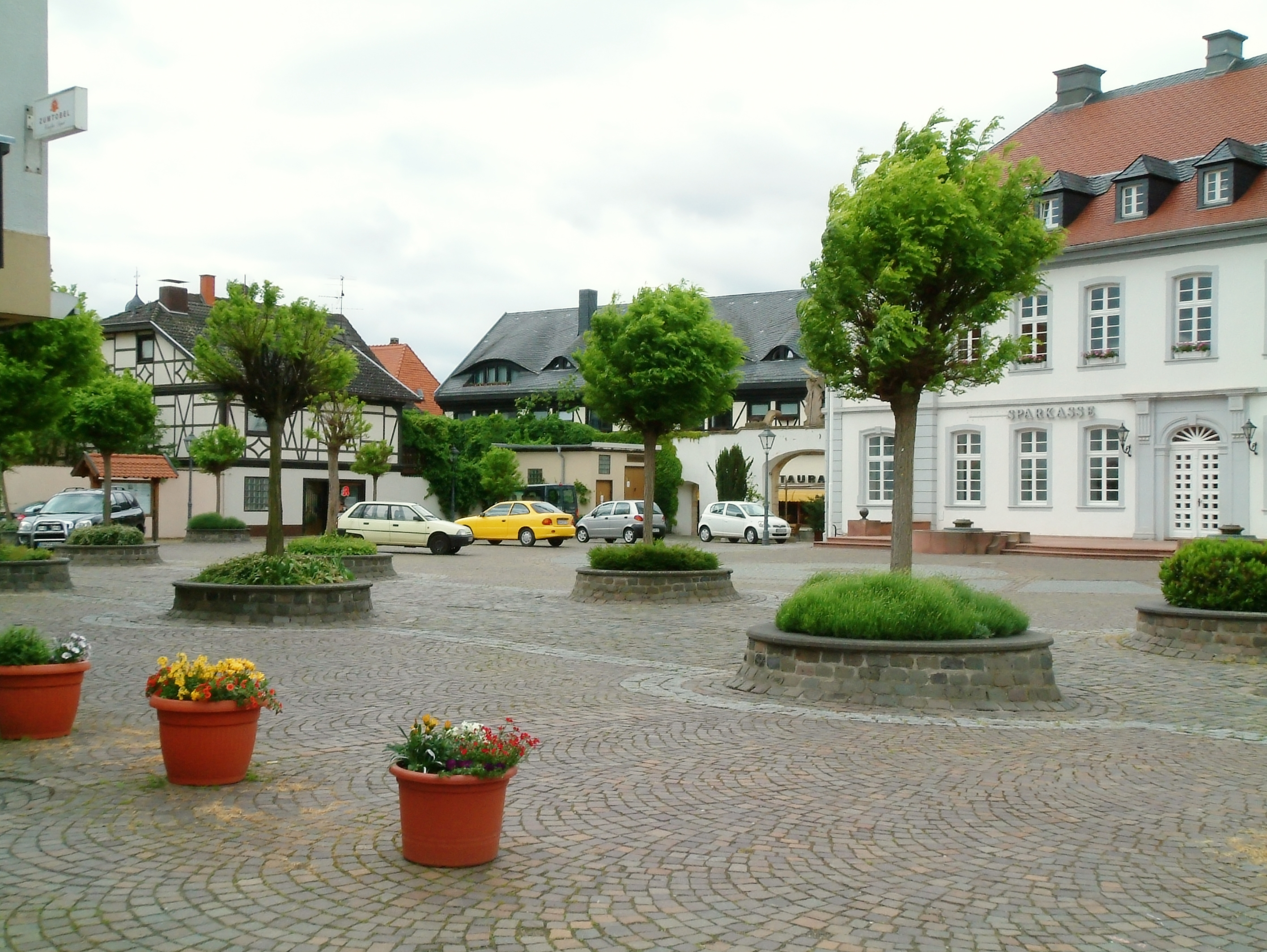
Village centre: Castle Square (Schlossplatz) with (from right) Sturmfedersches Schloss (Town Hall), Café Kempf and the St. Michael Apothecary's rear building

Dirmstein (Palatine German: Dermschdää) is an Ortsgemeinde – a municipality belonging to a Verbandsgemeinde, a kind of collective municipality – in the Bad Dürkheim district in Rhineland-Palatinate, Germany. With its roughly 3,000 inhabitants, it is the third largest Ortsgemeinde in the Verbandsgemeinde of Leiningerland, whose seat is in Grünstadt, although that town is itself not in the Verbandsgemeinde. Dirmstein lies in the outermost northeast of the district and the northwest of the Rhine-Neckar urban agglomeration.

In the 8th century, Dirmstein had its first documentary mention, although this was undated. The first dated documentary mention came in 842. Although it never belonged to the Counts of Leiningen, it is today counted as part of the Leiningerland, the name used for those noblemen's old domain. The historical and well restored village centre has been raised to a monumental zone by the monument protection authority. Of the 58 protected objects, 48 lie within this zone. With few exceptions, they go back, like the village's foremost landmark, the Baroque simultaneous church St. Laurentius (Saint Lawrence's), to the municipality's heyday in the 18th century, towards the end of which Dirmstein apparently held town rights for two decades, although some sources are disputed.

== Geography ==
=== Location ===
Dirmstein lies at an elevation of 108 m above sea level on the Upper Rhine Plain in the northeast Palatinate. The Rhine is 12 kilometers to the east, the Palatinate Forest begins 9 kilometers to the west and the border with the neighboring region of Rhenish Hesse runs 2 kilometers to the north.

=== Neighbouring municipalities ===
Clockwise from the north, these are Offstein and Worms-Heppenheim (both in Rhenish Hesse) to the north, Heuchelheim (Verbandsgemeinde of Heßheim) in the east and Gerolsheim, Laumersheim and Obersülzen (all in the Verbandsgemeinde of Leiningerland) in the south, southwest and west. Heppenheim lies 5 km away, Offstein 4 km and each of the others 2 km.

Towards the eastern end alongside the Rhine, the municipal area is quite even, rising to considerable hills in the west. These belong to the Palatinate wine region between the plain and the low mountain range, which here, until 1969, was known as Unterhaardt, but which now bears the name Mittelhaardt-Deutsche Weinstraße.

=== Streams ===
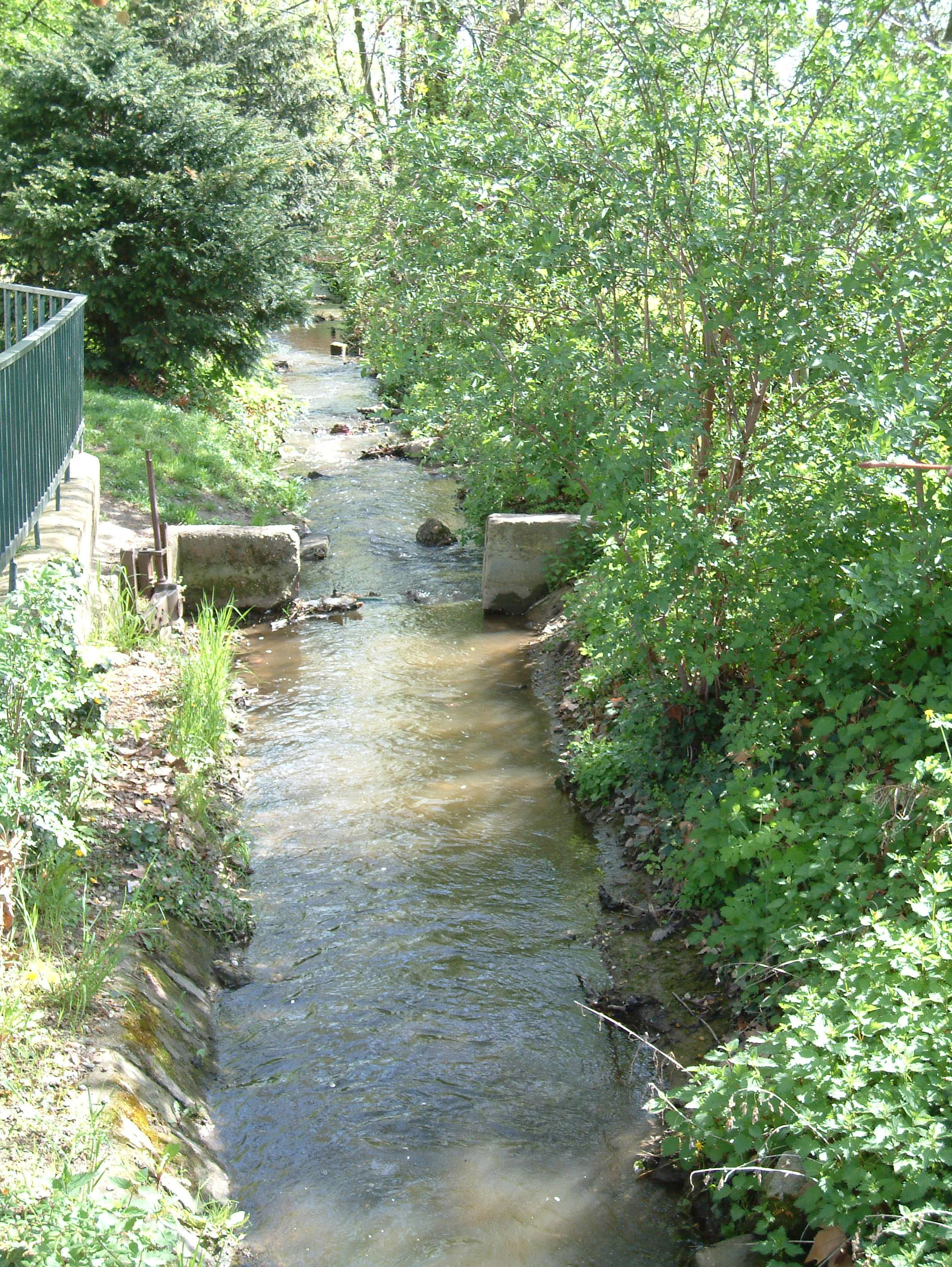
Channelling of the Eckbach from north (left) to east (straight ahead)

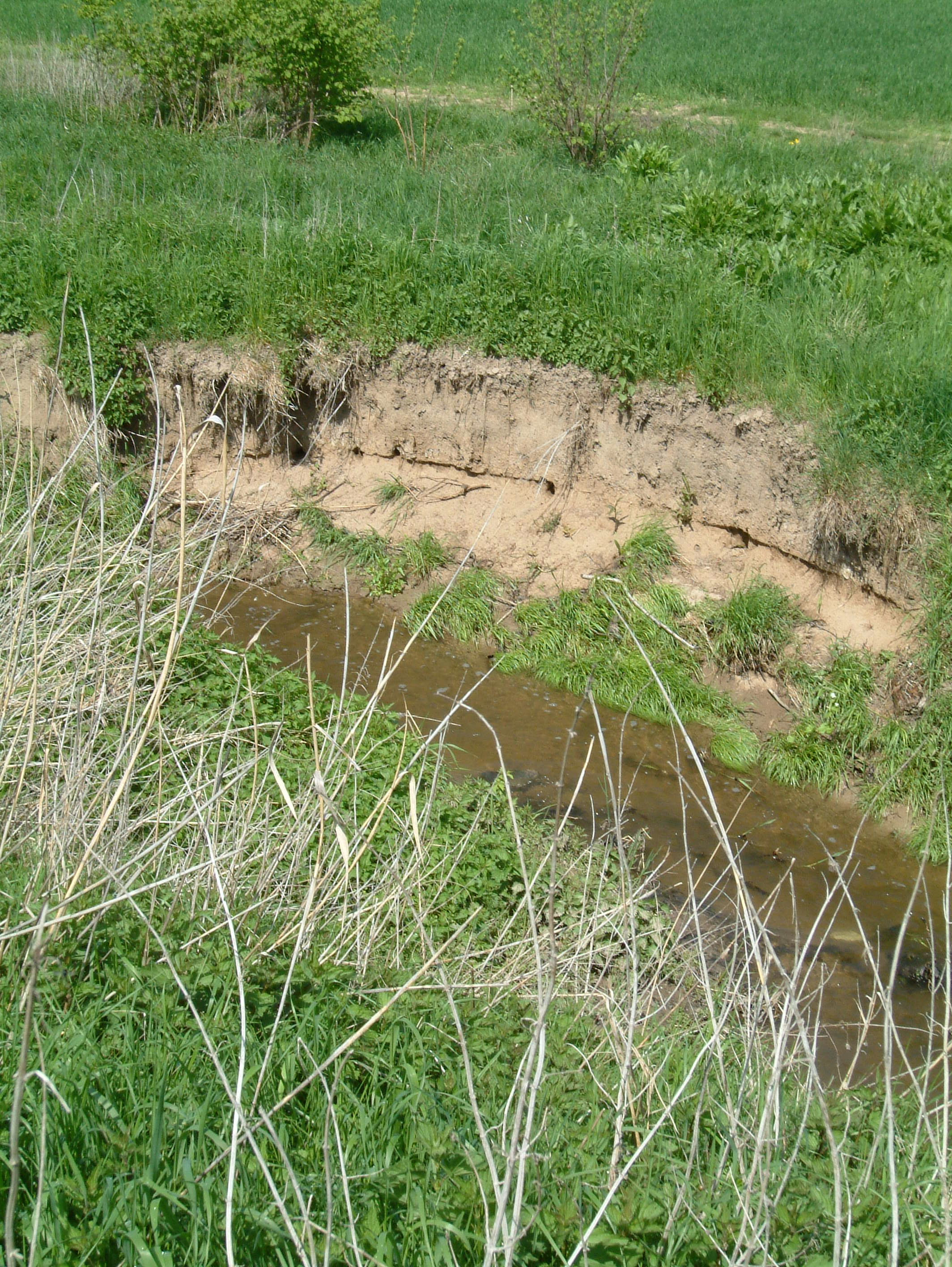
Worn deep into the layers of loess: Floßbach

The municipal area is crossed from west to east by the river Eckbach, which flows into the municipality in the southwest, from Laumersheim. In the 1920s, it was redirected from the village centre to the southern outskirts. Until this time, there had been a flat, pondlike broadening of the brook's bed south of the church on the Affenstein (a street), next to the village thoroughfare in which carriages could be cleansed of sand and loam buildup. As a new riverbed (going straight ahead instead of left), the old channel left over from the old "Upper Village’s" mediaeval fortification dyke seemed an obvious choice. Between the "Upper" and "Lower Village", today's Eckbach meets its old course again coming from the right.

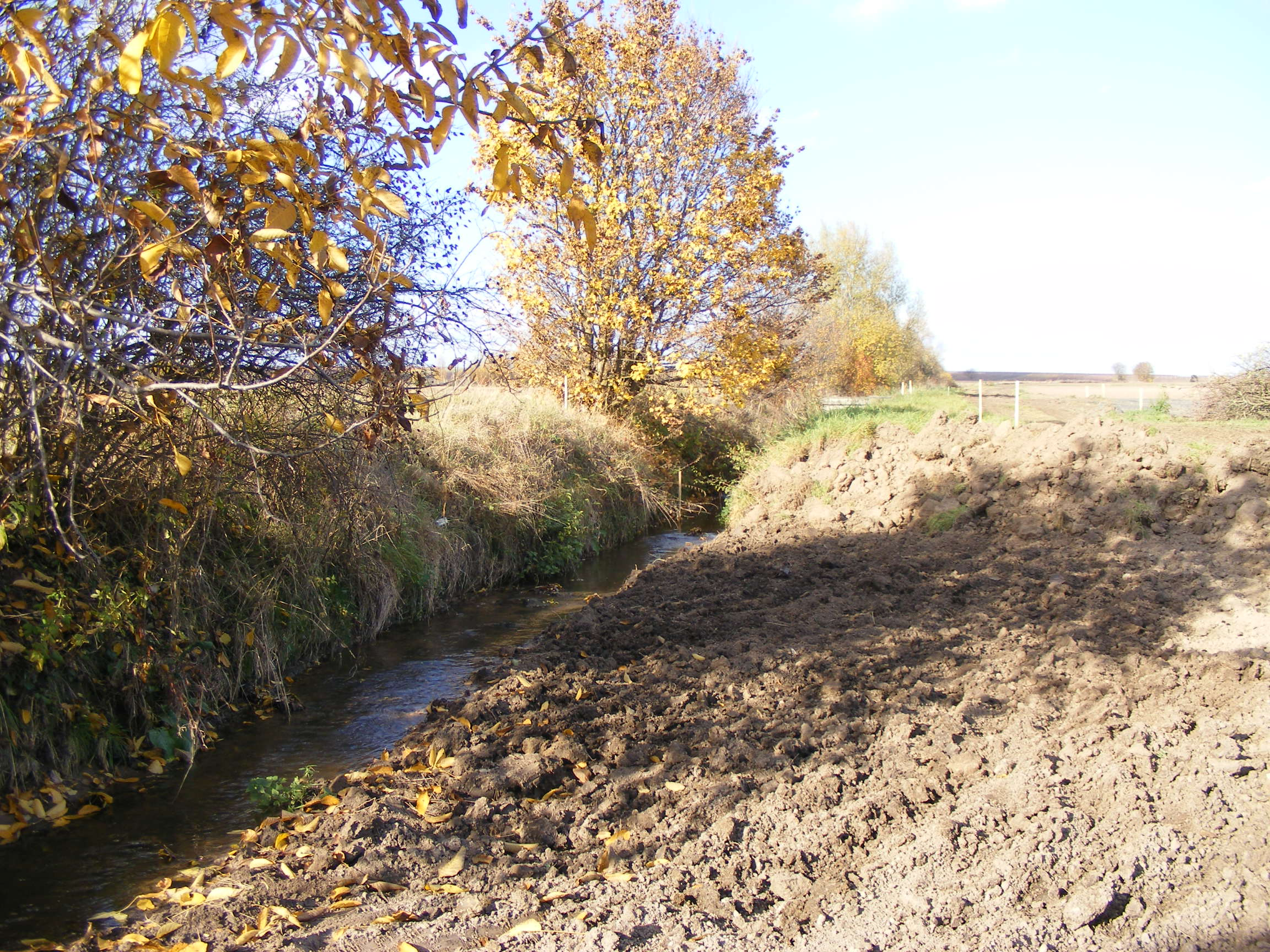
Renaturation of the Floßbach: evening out the steep banks

The in itself unimposing river Floßbach, coming from Obersülzen and also known locally as the Landgraben, which flows round Dirmstein in the north and on the village's eastern outskirts empties into the Eckbach from the left, was in the latter half of the 20th century straightened. The loss of flooding areas thus wrought, together with the increased speed of flow, brought about problems in times of heavy rainfall for the Nördlich der Heuchelheimer Straße ("North of Heuchelheim Road") construction site opened in the 1980s. In 1994 came widespread flooding for the first time, in which basements were filled with water up to their upper edges. In 2006, various versions of a plan to create flooding areas were brought forth for discussion. In 2008, Grünstadt-Land Verbandsgemeinde council decided to renaturate the brook over a stretch of a good kilometre. As an ecologically worthy measure, it was subsidized by the state of Rhineland-Palatinate to a share of 90% of the cost within the framework of its Aktion Blau. In October 2008, the conversion began, in which former cropland along the brook, which through Flurbereinigung had been transferred to the municipality's ownership, was removed so that the brook could broaden out to the sides in heavy rains. To reduce the speed of flow, meanders were built back in and, of particular importance, two almost right-angled bends were smoothed out. With the planting of typical local trees and shrubs, the renaturation was completed in early 2009.

=== Geology ===
The most important event in the eastern Palatinate's geological development was the rifting and downfaulting relative to the surrounding low mountains of the Upper Rhine Plain, whose onset was some 65,000,000 years ago in the Lower Tertiary and which has lasted until today. Before the mountains spread an area that was over time scored by the Eckbach and Floßbach. During the ice ages, there were gradual solifluction on the slopes and also wind abrasion in great parts of Europe. These processes led to a transformation of the original surface relief in whose wake a floodplain with embanked or eroded terraces formed. In colder, drier phases of the Würm glaciation, loess beds came into being through the influence of the wind, whereby the loess gathered mostly at faults and alee of small hollows. Later erosion created steep banks in the loess areas, which today can reach 6 m in height and are valuable biotopes.

The uppermost layer of deposits stems almost exclusively from the recent past. In lower-lying areas, the two brooks have washed the sediments downstream, with higher areas taking on new shapes more through weathering. The soils are overwhelmingly sandy and show to some extent loam admixture, whose concentration varies. As elsewhere in the area, the odd deposit of quartz sand is found, which owing to its purity is subject to mining rights, thereby giving it priority over agriculture. On these grounds, the local winemakers must now and then yield even highly valuable vineyards to quartz sand stripmining by businesses from outside the municipality.

=== Climate ===
Precipitation curve for Dirmstein: blue

Given the prevailing southwest and west winds, Dirmstein's location alee of the Palatinate Forest means that the locality must make do with at most 500 mm of precipitation yearly. Moreover, in weather out of the northwest, the massif of the Donnersberg, lying 25 km away in the North Palatine Highland and rising to 689 m, often likewise hinders any abundance of precipitation. Dirmstein falls into the lowest fourth of the precipitation chart for all Germany. Only at 22% of the German Weather Service's weather stations are even lower figures recorded. The driest month is January. The most rainfall comes in May. In that month, precipitation is 2.2 times what it is in January. Precipitation varies markedly by month.

Owing to the dearth of rain, the water table lies more than 10 m underground. On the one hand, this makes artificial irrigation necessary for cropraising, but on the other hand it makes for ideal conditions for winegrowing. The uppermost – dry – layers of earth warm up more quickly, promoting sugar formation in the grapes, and the vines must root deeper to reach enough moisture, which is advantageous to the absorption of minerals.

Since 1936, one kilometre south of Dirmstein, the Autobahn A 6 (Mannheim–Saarbrücken) has run, building work on which began as early as 1932. Since it was raised onto an embankment with an average height over the flanking lands of 5 m in the latter half of the 20th century, it has been a conspicuous barrier running across the Upper Rhine Plain to the Palatinate Forest, pierced only by a few underpasses. Just how much the roadway influences the local climate and whether, for example, it can lead to the formation of lakes of cold air has never been systematically investigated.

== History ==
=== Milestones ===
Time	Events	Persons	Objects
from 5th or 6th century	Evidence of settlers	Franks (Alamanni?)	Grave fields
8th century	Dirmstein's first documentary mention (undated)	Benedictines at Weißenburg Abbey (Alsace)	Codex Edelini
23 November 842	Dirmstein's first documentary mention (dated)	King and later Emperor Charles the Bald	Copy of letters patent
early 11th century	Dirmstein's first church: St. Petrus	Bishop of Worms (Burchard?)	
1141	First documentary mention of winegrowing in Dirmstein		
13th century	Forerunner buildings of the later castle	Bishop of Worms, local nobles (among them Jacob Lerch?)	
first quarter of the 17th century	Family Lerch's heyday	Caspar Lerch (1575–1642)	19-year exile
1689	Dirmstein in the Nine Years' War	French troops	Destruction of whole village by fire
first half of the 18th century	Building of Castle Koeth-Wanscheid; Building of Castle Quadt	Family Rießmann; Family Quadt	
from 1736	Expansion of Castle Sturmfeder	Baron Marsilius Franz Sturmfeder von Oppenweiler	1738: Building of Michelstor (gate at the castle)
1742–1746	Building of Laurentiuskirche (church)	Prince-Bishop Franz Georg von Schönborn-Buchheim	Design by Balthasar Neumann
about 1780	Rebuilding of Castle Sturmfeder	Baron Carl Theodor Sturmfeder von Oppenweiler	
1780–1801	Town rights		
about 1790	Building of Kellergarten	Baron Carl Theodor Sturmfeder von Oppenweiler	Landscaping architect Friedrich Ludwig von Sckell
1797–1815	Dirmstein French		Department of Mont-Tonnerre
1816–1945	Dirmstein Bavarian		"Rheinkreis", later "Rheinpfalz"
about 1830	Building of Schlosspark	Gideon von Camuzi	Landscaping architect Johann Christian Metzger
1891–1939	Running of local narrow-gauge railway		Old railway station
1969	District reorganization		Bad Dürkheim district
2018	Verbandsgemeinde assignment		Verbandsgemeinde of Leiningerland

=== Chronicle ===
==== Celts, Romans and Germanic peoples ====
When the Romans overran the region just before the beginning of the Christian Era, settled here were, besides Celts, also members of the Germanic tribe of the Vangiones. The Romans were removed late in their Empire's history, about 400, by another Germanic tribe, the Alamanni, who were thronging into the area, although they themselves were dislodged from their new homeland just under a century later by the likewise Germanic Franks. Thus far, though, there is no evidence of any settlement at what is now Dirmstein in those days.

==== Frankish times ====
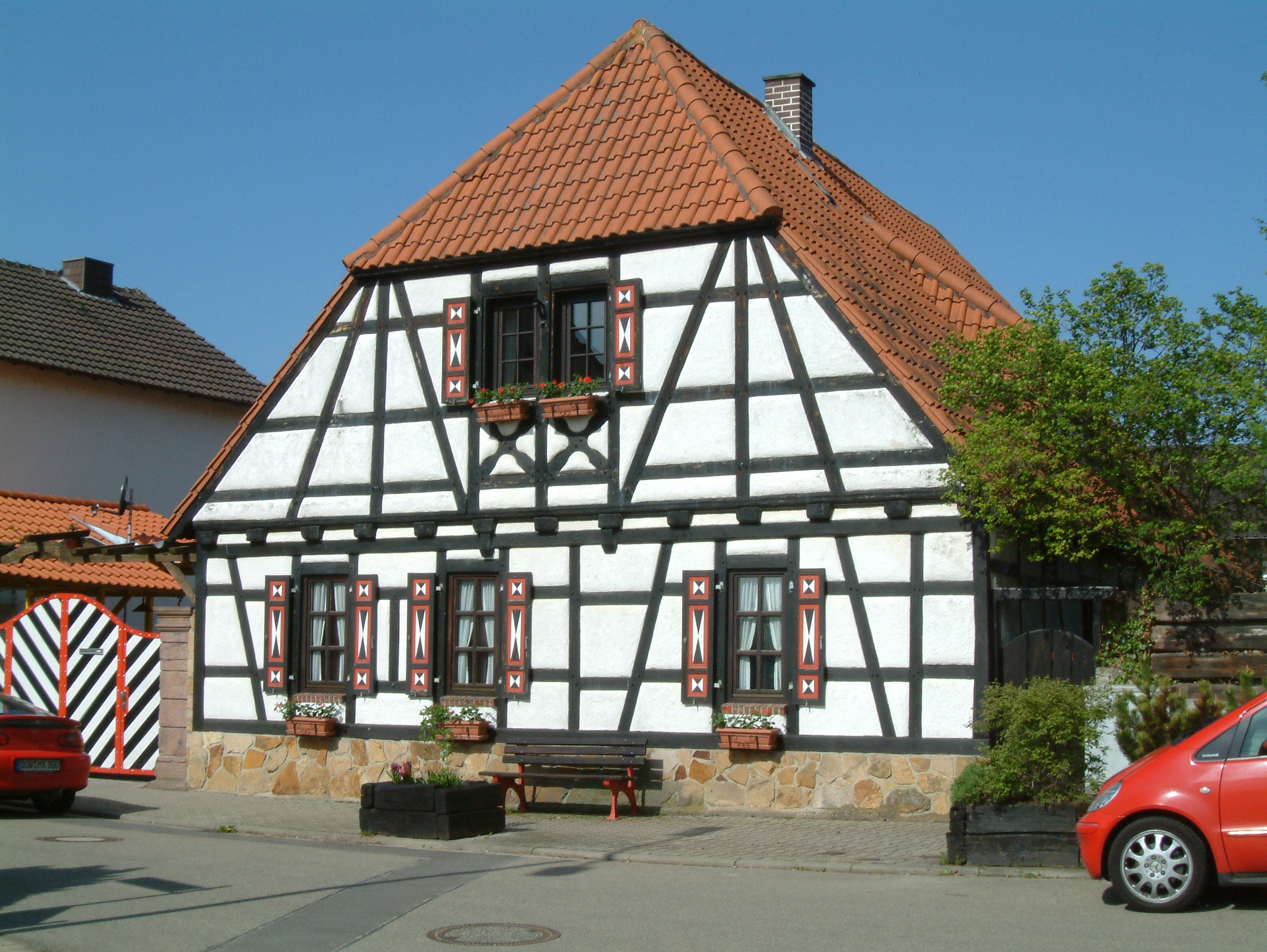
Old customs house: seed of the "Upper Village"?

The area around the forks of the Eckbach and Floßbach is known to have been settled beginning in the Early Middle Ages. Three Frankish grave fields from the 6th century, on the village's northeast outskirts, have been found since 1954. The last one to be found underwent archaeological investigation in the 1980s. The finds that were recovered were taken to the Historisches Museum der Pfalz ("Historical Museum of the Palatinate") in Speyer. Some of the experts who dealt with the artefacts are even of the opinion that the burial grounds, at least in part, were already being used in Alamannic times, putting their beginnings as far back as the 5th century.

In the 8th century, Dirmstein had already arisen as a Frankish settlement called Díramestein, which was named in the Codex Edelini ("Edelin’s Codex") – also known as the Weißenburg Codex – without any exact date. The seed from which grew the village was what is now called the Oberdorf ("Upper Village"). The greatest likelihood is that this stood in the southwest, where later the "castle" was built on the Eckbach. Less likely is that the village grew from what is now the northwest entrance to the village, where, near the old customs house the hills give way to the plain, and where once flowed a stream southwards towards the Eckbach. It is certain, however, that the Niederdorf ("Lower Village") soon thereafter arose a few hundred metres to the east in the area where the Floßbach empties into the Eckbach.

The first time when the village was mentioned with a date was in the 9th century. Charlemagne’s grandson, King of the Franks Charles the Bald, and later also Emperor, who had just met with his half-brother Louis the German in nearby Worms, issued on 23 November 842 letters patent to the Archbishop of Vienne, Agilmar (tenure: 841–859), for landholdings in Aquitaine and Burgundy "in villa Theormsthein" or "Thiormsthein".

==== Emperor, bishop and local nobility ====
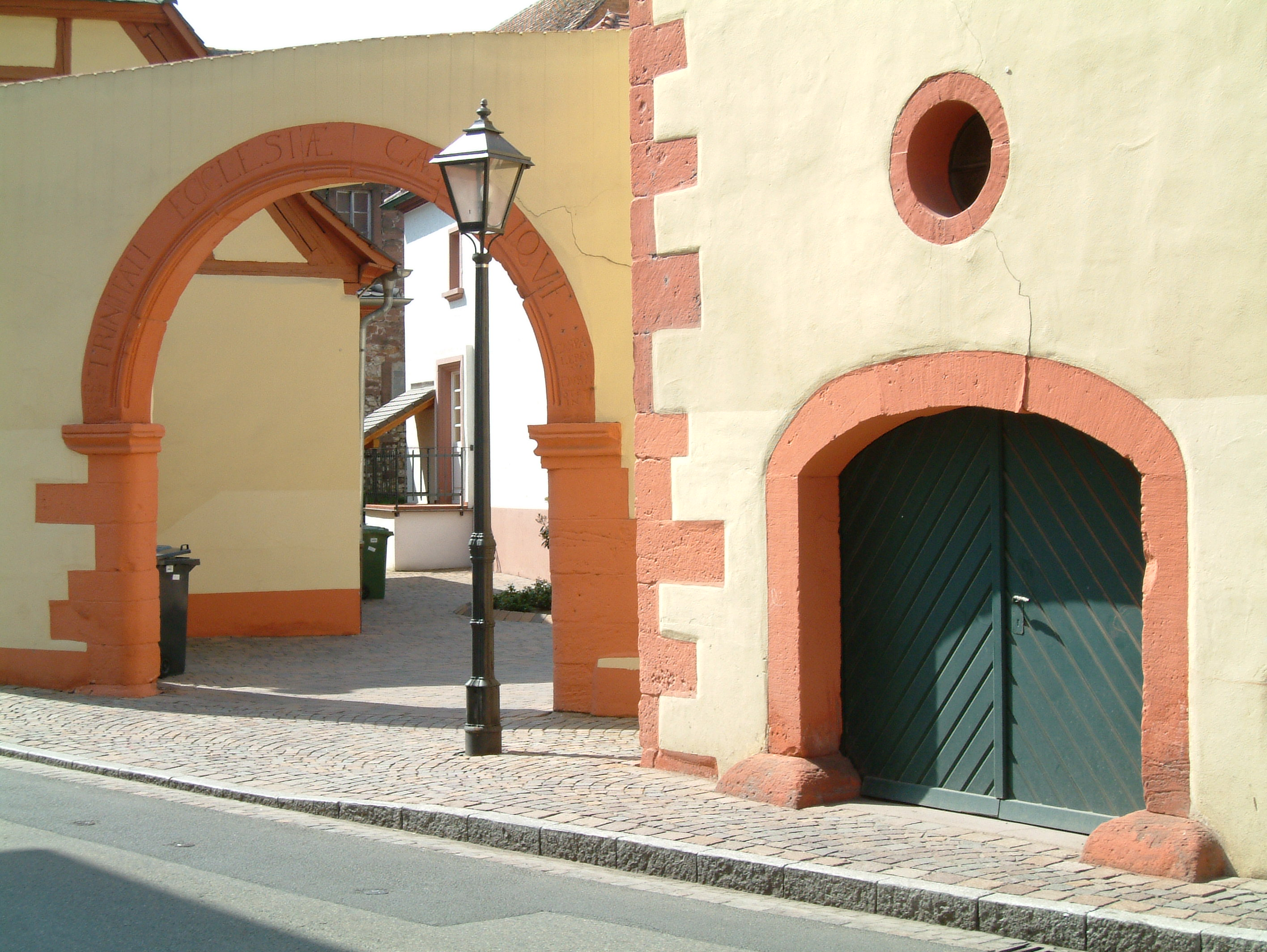
Spitalhof: Gateway arch with Caspar Lerch’s inscription

In the beginning, Dirmstein had Imperial immediacy, with the landlordship and jurisdiction therefore belonging directly to the King or Emperor. These rights were yielded on 4 April 1190 by Heinrich VI to the Bishop of Worms Konrad II of Sternberg. With documents from the years 1332 and 1384, the episcopal privileges were confirmed and in 1405 even partly expanded. A forerunner building to an episcopal palace – described simply as a "house" – was witnessed beginning in 1240; the actual palace, which also served the bishop as a summer seat, was only witnessed for the first time in 1414.

For administration the bishop availed himself of the members of the local nobility who already lived in Dirmstein or who went to live there. Dirmstein noble families were only mentioned in documents beginning in the 12th century. The best known was the family Lerch, who played an important rôle not only in the village but also – owing to their widespread holdings – throughout southwest Germany from the late 13th to the late 17th century when their family name died out. Their name is chiselled in stone at several historic buildings in Dirmstein, as it is on the gateway arch into the Spitalhof ("infirmary yard") and on the wall at today’s Fechtschule (literally "swordfighting school", but it is a remodelled castle) at the Kellergarten. After having married into the family in the mid-17th century, the family Sturmfeder von Oppenweiler came into the family Lerch’s inheritance.

Further noble families in the Middle Ages were, among others, the families Nagel von Dirmstein, Von der Hauben and Affenstein. Beginning in the 15th century, the nobility’s representatives formed an area of joint rule, called a Ganerbschaft, whose assemblies were held in a forerunner building to the St. Michael Apotheke built in 1535.

==== Condominium ====
From 1419 to 1705, Dirmstein belonged to two lords together; these were the Prince-Bishop of Worms and the Elector Palatine. Why such a condominium came to be in 1411 and was fixed by a written accord on 4 March 1419 despite the episcopal rights having been expanded only in 1405 is something that sources do not answer. Bishop Johann II of Fleckenstein and Elector Ludwig III shared all rights at and in Dirmstein, each getting half. It must have been in this time that the Kurpfälzisches Schloss ("Electoral Palatinate Castle") was built, which might well have been envisaged rather more as an administrative building. Little more than a century later, though, it had fallen into such disrepair due to war that it seems likely that it never underwent any repairs. Today, nobody even knows where the building stood.

The condominium proved itself throughout the time it was in force; differences were always amicably settled. The most important success might have been the awarding of the two major local churches, Saint Peter’s Church (Peterskirche) and Saint Lawrence’s Chapel (Laurentiuskapelle) to the Catholics and the Protestants respectively. This happened after the Reformation when Electoral Palatinate decided in the latter half of the 16th century to adopt Calvinism. In 1705, the condominium ended with a deal in which Worms regained full rights at and in Dirmstein through a territorial exchange with Electoral Palatinate. Only in the Protestant inhabitants’ internal business was the power of decision reserved to the Elector.

==== Times of war ====
In the German Peasants' War, the village itself suffered little, although on 4 June 1525, rebelling peasants under Dirmstein vassal Erasmus von der Hauben’s leadership razed the Episcopal and the Electoral Palatinate Castles, Castle Affenstein and the Augustinian monastery and set them on fire. The Episcopal Castle and Castle Affenstein were made useful once again, whereas the other two building complexes lay in ruins and eventually disappeared altogether.

Likewise little damage was wrought in the Thirty Years' War. Finding himself having to put up with repression was the avowed Catholic partisan Caspar Lerch (1575–1642), whose "castle" was plundered and who, together with his family, was forced into a 19-year exile. Caspar Lerch was a prominent representative of his family, first as Chamberlain of the Bishop of Speyer, then as Electorate of Mainz Amtmann in Tauberbischofsheim and finally as director of the Knightly Canton of the Upper Rhine (Ritterkanton Oberrhein). Furthermore he compiled many juristic works as well as a family chronicle.

In 1689, however, in the Age of Absolutism, Dirmstein was less lucky when French troops came and all but utterly burnt it down. From 1688 to 1697, the "Sun King", Louis XIV, waged the Nine Years' War (known in Germany as the Pfälzischer Erbfolgekrieg, or War of the Palatine Succession) over his sister-in-law Liselotte's inheritance – and somewhat paradoxically had Electoral Palatinate, the territory that he wanted as his own, reduced to rubble and ashes. In Dirmstein the blaze raged for three days, from 7 to 9 September. Only a few houses were left standing.

==== Baroque era ====
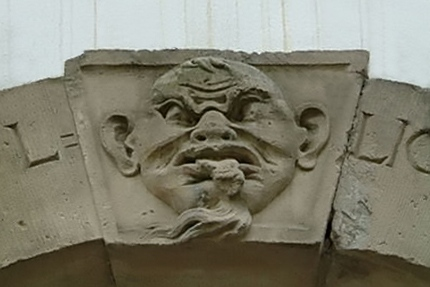
Chimera at the Michelstor

In the course of the Baroque era, a considerable community once more grew out of the two original centres, the "Upper" and "Lower Villages". One of this era's most important persons was Baron Marsilius Franz Sturmfeder von Oppenweiler (1674–1744), Caspar Lerch's second daughter's grandson. Having earned hostility for his wasteful running of the estate and his debts, he became legendary for his years-long quarrel with the authorities. He had his alleged success immortalized in 1738 on Castle Sturmfeder’s gateway, the Michelstor – along with many inscriptions – in the form of a sculpture of a victorious struggle over the devil, which according to contemporaries bears the then mayor’s facial features. Above the gate’s side entrance, a stone chimera has also been placed. The last bearer of the family name died in 1901.

Dirmstein has the interdenominational coöperation between the Catholic Prince-Bishop of Worms and the Protestant Elector, which happened despite an end being put to the condominium, to thank for its famous simultaneous church, St. Laurentius (Saint Lawrence’s). With this church building in the mid-18th century began a phase of prosperity for the village that lasted a good hundred years. From 1780 to 1801, only a century after the inferno of the Nine Years' War, Dirmstein, according to various sources, was even awarded town rights.

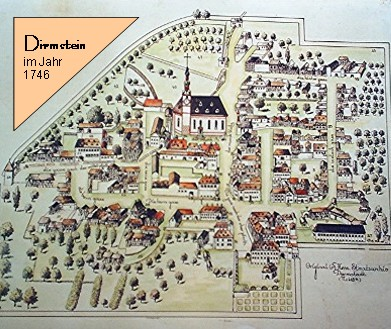
Upper Village 1746: contemporary map, south is at top

A social problem grew out of the short-lived running of a stoneware factory that existed from 1778 to 1788 in the middle of the Upper Village. There, the Bishopric of Worms was having "Dirmstein Faïence" made from the white clay that came from the Bishopric’s own stripmine near today’s Hettenleidelheim in the northeast Palatinate Forest, a product whose now few preserved examples are sought after in collectors’ circles. As early as 1779, a few months after production began, the then mayor, Johann Michael Graeff, schemed against the factory head and ceramics expert Johann Carl Vogelmann, casting false accusations his way, whereupon Vogelmann’s belongings were withheld as he, along with his wife and seven children, was hounded out of the village. Graeff took the banished former head’s job at the factory, but was such a dilettante when it came to running the business that in 1782, the Bishopric unseated him. Under Graeff’s successors, though, the business never did recover, leading to the 20- to 30-strong workforce’s impoverishment, culminating in strike-like events. Further reasons given for ending the project were the cumbersome carting of the raw materials over some 25 km and the distribution difficulties with the finished products in the face of the many customs duties.

==== Foreign rule ====
Towards the end of the 18th century, the turmoil of the French Revolution also held Electoral Palatinate in its grip. Its territory on the Rhine’s left bank was annexed de facto by the French state in 1797, and in 1801 the annexation became official. Among other things, this led to Dirmstein’s once again losing its town rights. Until the end of the Napoleonic era in 1815, the annexed territory was governed as part of the Department of Mont-Tonnerre (or Donnersberg in German).

After the Congress of Vienna, the Palatinate’s left-bank lands, and Dirmstein along with them, were assigned to the Kingdom of Bavaria, whose ruling dynasty, the House of Wittelsbach, had its roots in Electoral Palatinate. The Rheinkreis that thus came into being, which was later named Rheinpfalz (Rhenish Palatinate) to distinguish it from the likewise Bavarian Upper Palatinate (Oberpfalz), remained Bavarian until the end of the Second World War.

The rest of the 19th century passed without great incident. Taking over from the nobles, whom the French had dispossessed were nouveau riche members of the upmarket citizenry, who expanded the castles and manor houses that had been auctioned off, enlarged park facilities and laid out new ones. The majority of the villagers, though, was very poor.

==== Emigration ====
The Palatinate, which had been characterized over the centuries by neediness and war, lost over time many of its people to other countries. In Dirmstein, emigration was in very small measure to places in Eastern and Southeastern Europe (Galicia, Banat, Bačka). Against that, however, a considerably greater number of the emigrants went to the United States to seek their fortune there.

Before US independence, only single persons or families emigrated there, as in 1708, 1742 and 1752. In the 19th century, though, came a wave of emigration, which was recorded in a Dirmstein Auswanderungsregister ("Emigration Register") that was painstakingly kept for one hundred years and according to digital survey contains more than 600 records. According to this register, between 1806 and 1905 more than 1,200 Dirmsteiners left their homeland, especially younger families, often with many children. The last two entries refer to Dirmstein Jews, who in 1937 could still emigrate to Argentina.

==== World wars and National Socialism ====
Dirmstein came through the First World War unscathed, at least in terms of damage to the municipality itself. The cost in human terms, however, was 53 lives.

In 1933, at the beginning of the Third Reich, 15 Jewish citizens lived in the municipality, along with one "Jewish Mischling of the Second Degree"; eleven of them belonged to the extended family Hirsch. The family Liebmann managed to flee to Argentina with their nine-year-old daughter in 1937. Frieda Hirsch likewise emigrated there in 1938, but had to leave her ten-year-old son David behind. The nine Jews still remaining in Dirmstein in 1940 were deported under the so-called Bürckel-Wagner Action (they were both Gauleiters) to Camp Gurs. In 1941 in the South of France, David Hirsch and the distantly related Elisabeth Klara Hirsch and her daughter Ella managed to get away. The two women emigrated to the United States, where Ella’s elder brother had likely already gone in 1938. David Hirsch followed his mother to Argentina in 1947. In 2005 and 2009, he visited his schoolfriend Arthur Maurer in Dirmstein. The other six deportees died in concentration camps or disappeared there.

Among Dirmstein’s inhabitants, 89 soldiers fell and 41 were listed as missing in the Second World War. On 20 March 1945, American aircraft advancing on the Rhine attacked the village causing bomb damage and striking houses with autocannon fire. Their target was German soldiers fleeing by the village, many of whom were killed, whereas there were no casualties among the inhabitants.

In connection with the Second World War, there are two stories worth mentioning because they so thoroughly contrast with each other:

The former prisoner of war Stanisław Świątek (born 1920) from the now Polish city of Szczecin (formerly the German city of Stettin), who from 1940 onwards had spent five years in Dirmstein, maintained a lifelong friendship with the village for more than half a century because of his good experiences, and he conveyed to young fellow countrymen and countrywomen, whom he brought along on visits, his outlook on international understanding. After his first visit, a feature article about it by Albert H. Keil appeared in the Bad Dürkheim district’s yearbook, and Jürgen Bich reported it in the daily press.

Against that heartwarming story, however, comes another about an RAF tail gunner named Sergeant Cyril William Sibley (born 1923), who was wounded in captivity after his Halifax bomber was shot down, and then murdered by Nazi Ortsgruppenleiter Adolf Wolfert. In 1946, he and his accomplice in Sibley’s death, Georg Hartleb, were sentenced by a British court-martial to death, a fate that they eventually met after a half year of fruitless appeals. They were both hanged in Hamelin on 11 October 1946. In 1985, 2004 and 2008, the bloody deed done Sibley found its literary reappraisal in works by the Dirmstein writers Walter Landin and Isolde Stauder. There is a Stolperstein in Sergeant Sibley's memory in the municipality.

Fate of Dirmstein's Jews 1937–1940
Stolperstein number	Name	Relations	Birth	Deportation	Death resulting from deportation	Flight/Emigration	Home after flight/emigration
1	Salomon Hirsch	Husband of Dina Hirsch	13 October 1875 in Birkenau	22 October 1940 to Gurs	August 1942 at Auschwitz
2	Dina Hirsch née Strauss	Wife of Salomon Hirsch	14 April 1872 in Dirmstein	22 October 1940 to Gurs	27 October 1941 at Gurs
3	Sarah Strauss	Sister of Dina Hirsch	21 July 1874 in Dirmstein	22 October 1940 to Gurs	15 November 1940 at Gurs
4	Irma Hirsch	Daughter of Salomon and Dina Hirsch	24 August 1905 in Dirmstein	22 October 1940 to Gurs	August 1942 at Auschwitz
	Frieda Hirsch	Daughter of Salomon and Dina Hirsch	19 September 1907 in Dirmstein			8 July 1938 emigrated to Argentina	Buenos Aires, deceased
5	David Hirsch	Son of Frieda Hirsch	15 May 1928 in Mainz	22 October 1940 to Gurs		1941 fled to South of France and 1943 to Switzerland, 1947 emigrated to Argentina	Buenos Aires, deceased
6	Lilli Hirsch	Daughter of Salomon and Dina Hirsch	16 May 1909 in Dirmstein	22 October 1940 to Gurs	August 1942 at Auschwitz
7	Karoline Hirsch	unknown	15 August 1892 in Dirmstein	22 October 1940 to Gurs	28 August 1942 at Auschwitz
8	Elisabeth Klara Hirsch née Lorch	Mother of Julius and Ella Hirsch	13 April 1866 in Laumersheim	22 October 1940 to Gurs		3 November 1941 fled to South of France, 1942 emigrated to USA	Brooklyn, MA, died 1958
	Julius Hirsch	Son of Elisabeth Klara Hirsch	15 August 1896 in Dolgesheim			1938 emigrated to USA	Brooklyn, MA, deceased
9	Ella Hirsch	Daughter of Elisabeth Klara Hirsch	5 September 1899 in Dolgesheim	22 October 1940 to Gurs		3 November 1941 fled to South of France, 1942 emigrated to USA	Brooklyn, MA, died 3 February 1975
	Adolf Liebmann	Husband of Emilia Liebmann	25 September 1890 in Dirmstein			1937 emigrated to Argentina	Argentina, deceased
	Emilia Liebmann	Wife of Adolf Liebmann	27 June 1892 in Kirchheim			1937 emigrated to Argentina	Argentina, deceased
	Gertrud Liebmann	Daughter of Adolf and Emilia Liebmann	25 June 1928 in Ludwigshafen			1937 emigrated to Argentina	Argentina

==== Since the war ====
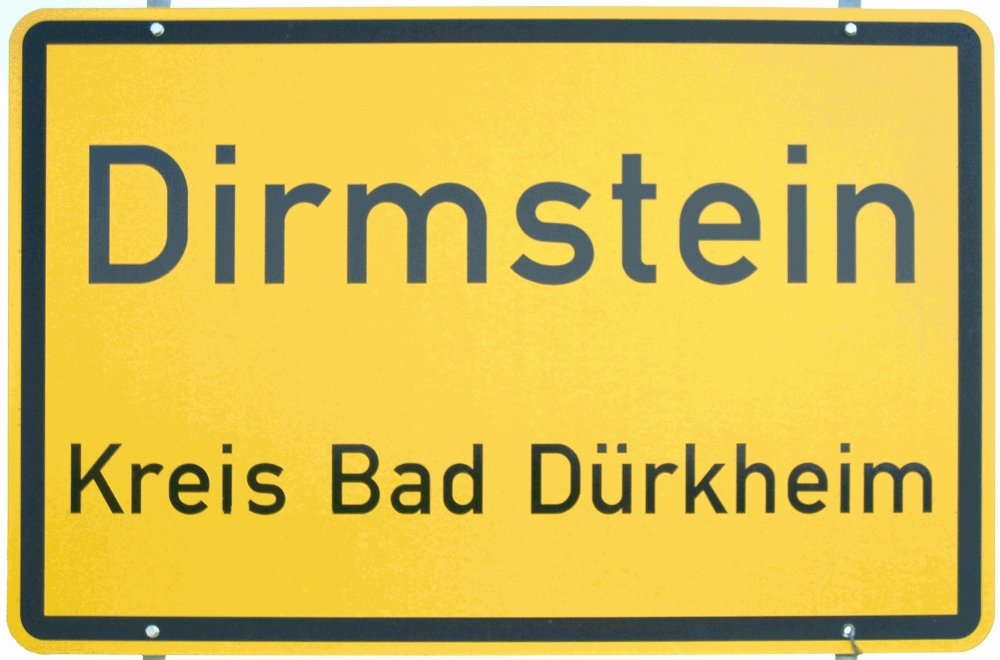
Municipal roadsign since district reform in 1969

After the Second World War, the municipality's history unfolded relatively uneventfully. The administrative reform in Rhineland-Palatinate led in 1969 to a reassignment from the abolished Frankenthal district to the new Bad Dürkheim district, and in 1972 came the municipality's grouping into the likewise newly formed Verbandsgemeinde of Leiningerland.

More dramatic, at least for some of the inhabitants, was the widespread flooding in 1994 in the Nördlich der Heuchelheimer Straße ("North of Heuchelheim Road") housing estate, which had been opened only ten years earlier. In 1996, the municipality celebrated the 250th anniversary of the consecration of Saint Lawrence's Church. On 1 December 1998, the filling station at the northeast entrance to the village was so heavily damaged by a truck that it had to be closed for a week and the building renovation was only finished early the following year. Early in 2000, there was a great fire that laid the former discount store in ruins.

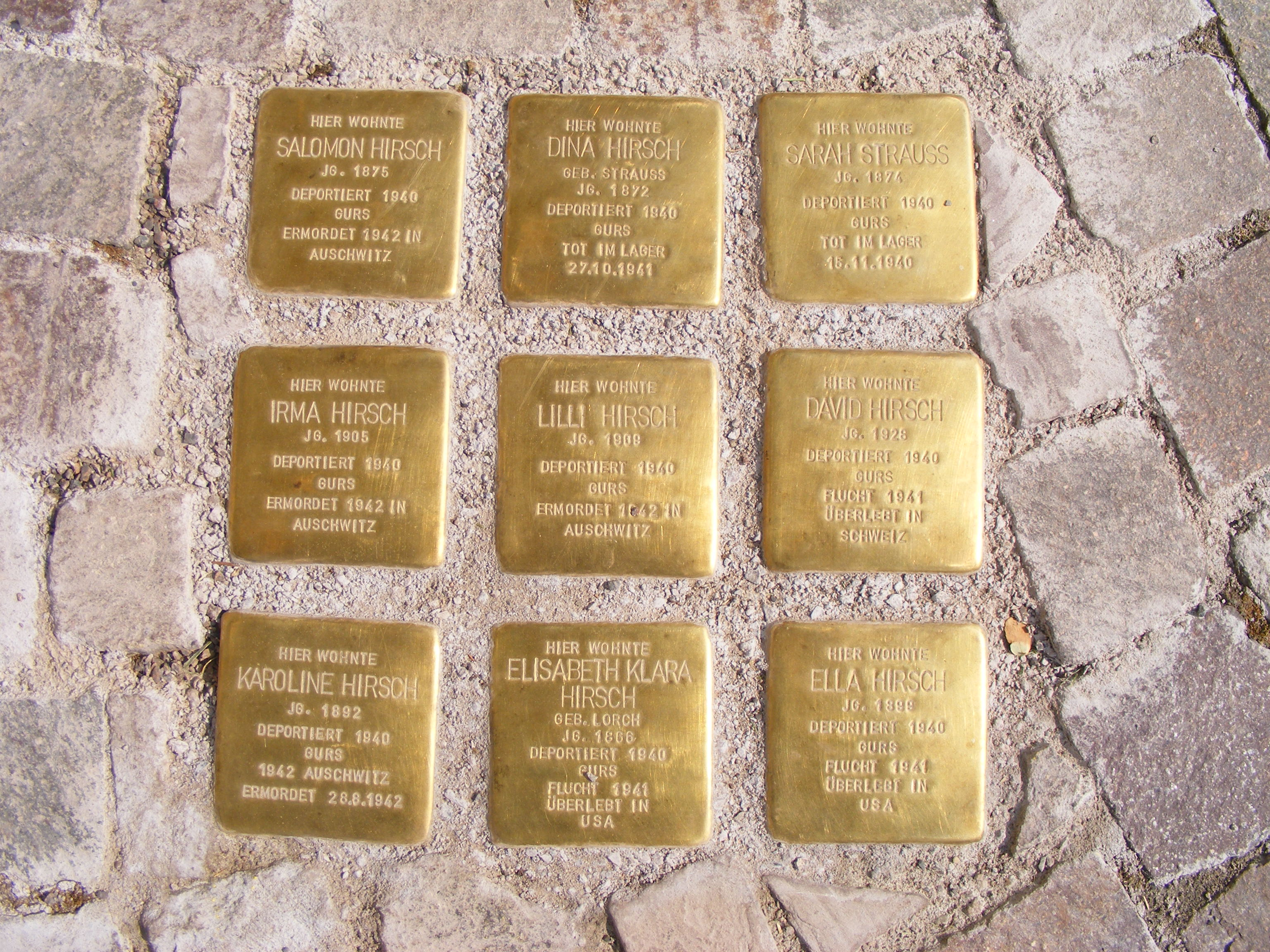
The nine Stolpersteine for deported Jews

On 23 November 2005, the 1,163rd anniversary of Dirmstein's first documentary mention, the local chronicle appeared after more than 20 years’ preparation. Working together on this project were not only the publisher (Michael Martin, Landau), who in work lasting years had marshalled the unusually comprehensive municipal archive, but also a few other outside specialists from the Kulturverein St. Michael Dirmstein (cultural club) as well as many writers from the village.

In March 2009, the event "Dirmstein erinnert sich" ("Dirmstein remembers"), lasting several days, was held, at which the Cologne artist Gunter Demnig laid Stolpersteine for the victims of National Socialism. Nine bear the names of Jews who were deported to concentration camps, while one is dedicated to the murdered Englishman Cyril William Sibley. The central historical-literary evening was created by Dirmstein writers Jürgen Bich, Albert H. Keil, Walter Landin and Otfried K. Linde.

=== Municipality’s name ===
Name's development
Date	Form	Remarks
8th century	Díramestein	first mention (undated)
842	Theormsthein or Thiormsthein	Possible transcription for Díermstein
1044	Díermundestein
1110 and 1120	Díeremestein
1141	Díermestein
1190	Dirmenstein
12th–15th centuries	Dirmestein, Dirmenstein, Dirminstein
1315	Dirmstein	First use of modern spelling
1529	Durmstein	Variant
1561	Dirmbstein	Variant
1582	Diermsteun	Variant

Considering especially the name's early forms, science today interprets the placename as "Diermuntstein", thus meaning something like "Diermunt's Stone (House)". Apparently a wealthy man managed to build his house here out of stone, which lasted longer than the customary material, wood. Since at the earliest known mention in the 8th century an elided form of the name is already used, it is assumed that at this time, Dirmstein had already been for at least a few generations a named place, whose name was already subject to modification.

The placename developed through many variations, of which a few notable ones have been chosen for this article: In 842 came the first dated documentary mention of the village in a document signed by King of the Franks Charles the Bald "in villa Theormsthein" or "Thiormsthein". Since this document only exists as a 17th-century transcription, research assumes that, following what was customary then, an original "Díermstein" was transcribed. From 1110 comes a document from Provost Hartwig von St. Paul zu Worms, in which the village is listed under the name Díeremestein. With another document from Worms from 1190, Emperor Heinrich IV transferred the Vogtei over Dirmenstein to the Bishopric of Worms. In 1315, the name Dirmstein was first used in its modern spelling. In the 16th century, variant forms were being used in which the i was mutated into a u, a b was inserted, or the diphthong ei was written as eu.

== Population ==
=== Religion ===
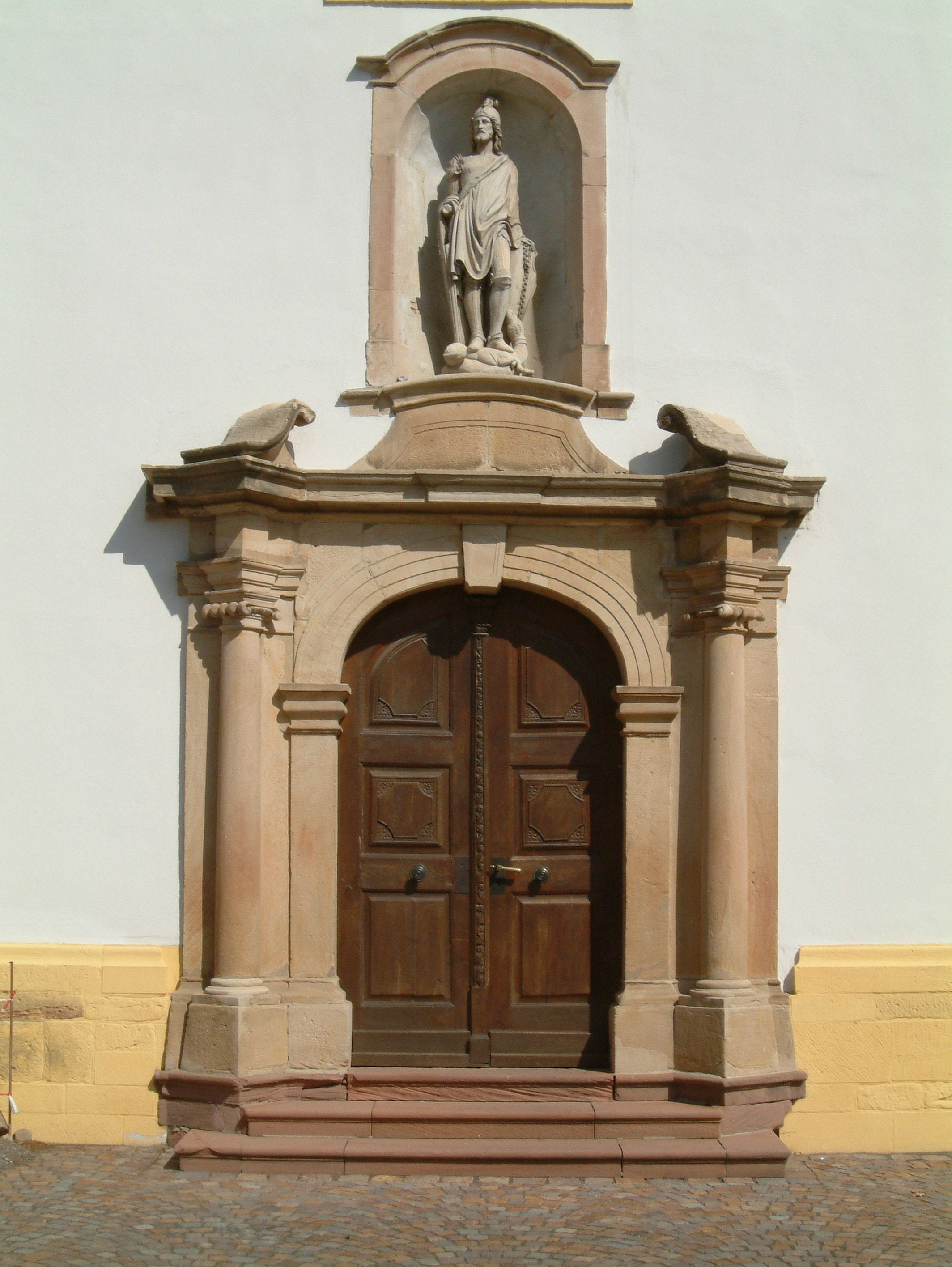
South portal of the Laurentiuskirche

Dirmstein's first parish church stood in the "Lower Village". It was built in Romanesque times, clearly before 1044 and presumably on a bishop's initiative, for it was consecrated to the patron saint of the Bishopric of Worms, Saint Peter. Given several consistent sources, historians estimate the church's capacity at only some hundred persons, implying low population figures. The "Upper Village" had at its disposal the Gothic Saint Lawrence's Chapel (Kapelle St. Laurentius), first mentioned in 1240, which was raised to a branch church. In the 14th century it was joined by Saint Anthony's Chapel (Kapelle St. Antonius) at the graveyard in the "Lower Village" and the Infirmary Yard Chapel of Mary Magdalene (Spitalhof-Kapelle St. Maria Magdalena) in the "Upper Village". These chapels, too, are an indication that the low population would have made a big church needless.

Saint Lawrence's Chapel was converted in the 16th century into a Reformed church. Burnt to ruins in the 1689 fire, it was replaced in 1742 to 1746 by today's Baroque simultaneous church, which stands on the same spot, and whose Catholic part was once again consecrated as Saint Lawrence's. Its capacity was enough for the whole village. Given this, and Saint Peter's Church's continuing slide into disrepair in the 18th century, the latter church was auctioned off in 1809 and torn down. Saint Anthony's Chapel was likewise relieved of its duties when the old graveyard was forsaken and a new one established about 1850. The Infirmary Yard Chapel has lasted until the present day, although it has been deconsecrated and several times remodelled.

In 1367 in the north of the village centre, an Augustinian priory was founded, as was an Augustinian monastery in 1500, which was later run by the Jesuits. While the Augustinian monastery only lasted until it was burnt down in the Peasants' War in 1525, the Jesuit house lasted for 300 years. In the Late Middle Ages, the monks had the sulphur-bearing mineral spring that they used northwest of the village, the Chorbrünnel, set in stone. The Dirmstein priest's post, before it was taken over by regular priests, is believed to have been occupied by the Jesuit fathers, although only the records from the later years, from 1685 to 1705, are preserved. About 1800, the Jesuit community was dissolved as a result of the French Revolution and its attendant secularization.

Religious affiliation over the last 250 years is well documented, and in this time it was, given the population figures, subject to great change.

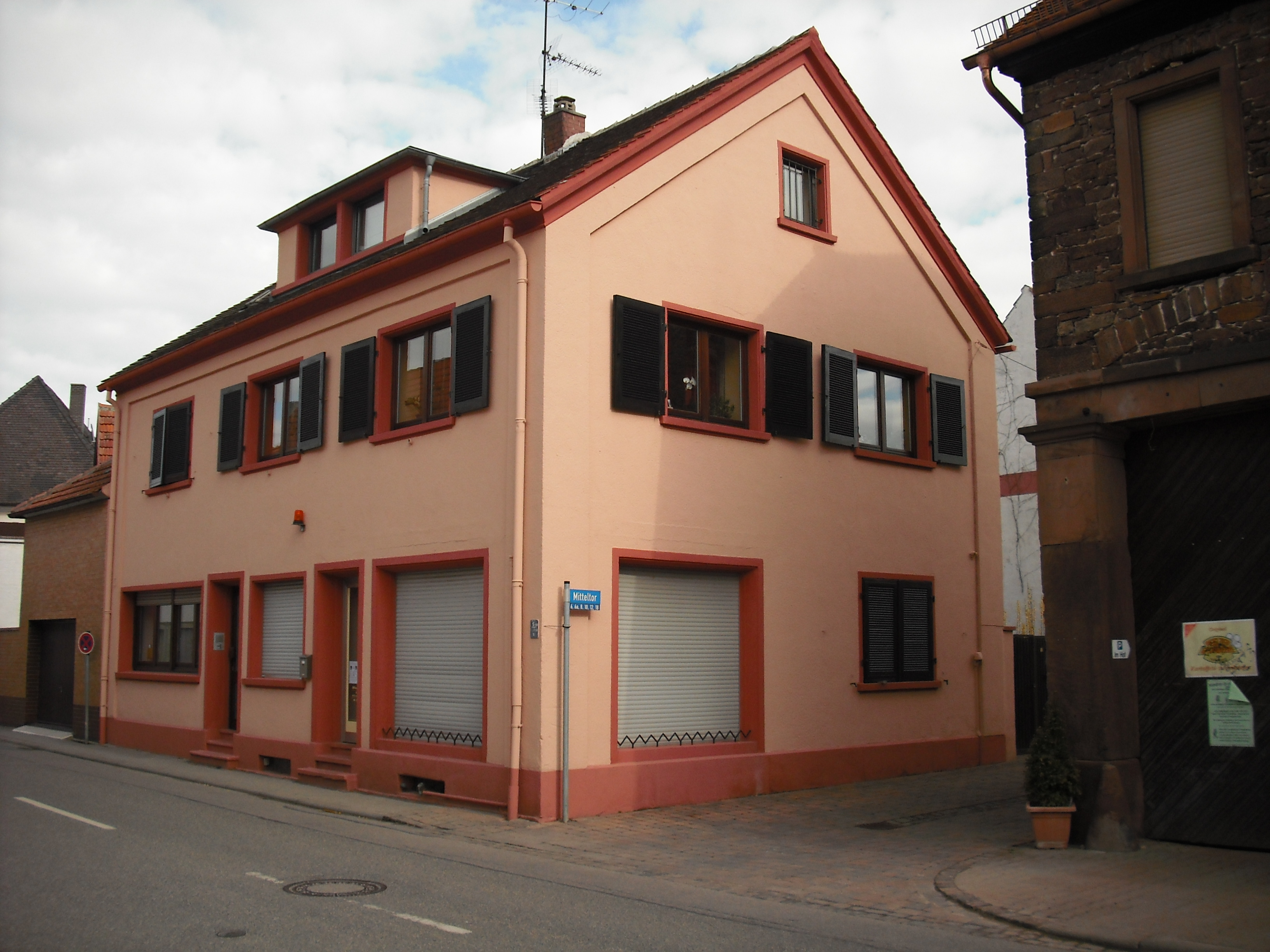
Synagogue, converted into a house

The simultaneous church was built in 1746 with the floor area allotted at a 2:1 ratio in the Catholics' favour for in the mid-18th century, this corresponded with the village's denominational makeup of two-thirds Catholic and one-third Protestant or Reformed. Somewhat more than half a century later, though, only 56% of the villagers were Catholic and 40% Protestant. After 2000 Protestants were 45.46% of the population, Catholics 33.74% and those with other or no religious beliefs 20.79%.

From the time of the first written evidence of a Jewish community (1464) until the early 20th century, the Jewish share of the population was usually a few dozen, peaking at 129 in 1855. Beginning no later than 1738, and thereafter with interruptions, the Jewish community maintained a "Judenschuhl", a folk word for synagogue. In 1858, after building work lasting two years, a new synagogue was consecrated on the corner of Mitteltor and Hildebrandstraße (near Saint Lawrence's and across the street, slantwise, from the Old Town Hall). Over the next few decades, the Jewish community shrank mainly owing to emigration. About 1913 it virtually ceased to exist. The now no longer used synagogue was falling ever further into disrepair. In 1932, the ramshackle building was sold and remodelled from the ground up, leaving only the rear façade in its original form. It is now used as a house, and no longer shows any sign of its former function. In Nazi times, all Jews still living in Dirmstein in 1940 fell victim to the Holocaust with the exception of the three who escaped from a concentration camp .

=== Population figures ===
Year	Inhabitants
1682	*445
1710	*516
1771	945
1802	1,252
1815	1,500
1835	2,049
1871	1,517
1905	1,467
1939	1,672
1950	1,924
1961	2,091
1970	2,252
1986	2,587
2004	3,100
2005	3,030

Only from 1771 does the municipal archive have a concrete basis on which to determine population figures; the dates listed in the table before that time (marked with an asterisk) refer to assessment book figures and represent minima, which could be considerably too low as population figures, as those not subject to taxation are not included in the books.

The sharp growth in the late 18th century might be traceable to the prospects that the "town" – as it is said Dirmstein was from 1780 to 1801 – could offer its citizens. This growth carried on until the beginning of industrialization, which made itself felt in Dirmstein about the middle of the 19th century. Emigration and urbanization then led, however, to a drop in population continuing for 100 years, which was reversed only by new growth in the wake of the Second World War. This turned out to be rather a slow rise in population until the 1980s, when it intensified. The 3,000 mark was breached in 1996, and since then, the rate has remained fairly constant.

=== Age breakdown ===
Breakdown by age
Age groups	1–9	10–19	20–29	30–39	40–49	50–59	60–69	70–79	80–89	90–99	Total
2002 (%)	336 (11)	363 (12)	346 (11)	537 (18)	532 (17)	448 (15)	379 (12)	209 (7)	92 (3)	18 (0.6)	3,051 (100)
1710 (%)	205 (40)	70 (14)	62 (12)	83 (16)	61 (12)	21 (4)	13 (3)	1 (0.2)	–	–	516 (100)

The local age breakdown has altered radically over time. In 1682, more than half Dirmstein's inhabitants were children or youths aged 19 or younger. About 1850, their share of the population had sunk to a bit more than a third. By 2003, it amounted to 21.5%. On the other hand, the figure for those older than 40 rose from 19% in 1682 to 48.7% in 2003. In the tabulated comparison between the years 1710 (although as above, for this year the source is the assessment book and therefore does not count those who did not pay taxes) and 2002, a noticeable shift towards the right, and therefore the greater ages, is shown, and it can also be observed that the figures for the middle decades have evened out somewhat.

Thus, the trend towards an aging population can also be seen in Dirmstein. Nevertheless, the figures did not match the 1995 countrywide average until eight years later. The 2002 figures show something else, too: More than 3.5% of the inhabitants are old or very old people, who mainly still live in a family situation, for there is no seniors' home or nursing home in Dirmstein.

== Politics ==
=== Coat of arms ===
The German blazon, in the 2007 approval documents from the Bad Dürkheim district administration, reads:

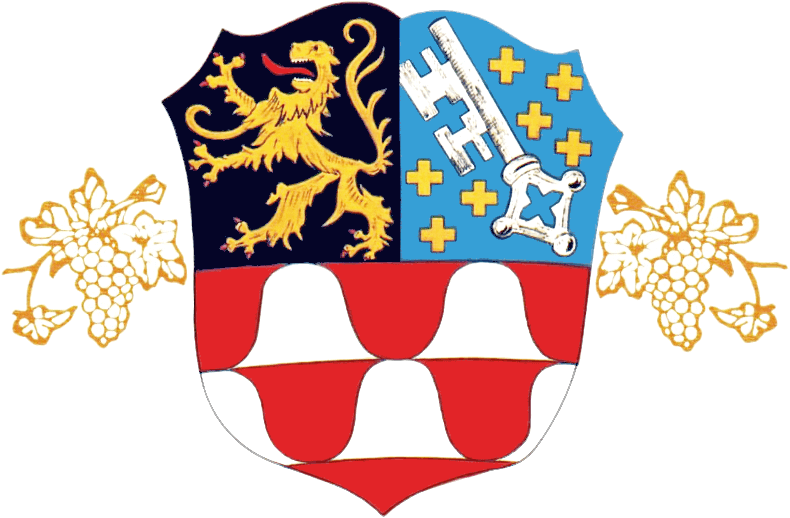

Das Wappen der Gemeinde Dirmstein ist geteilt und oben von Schwarz und Blau gespalten, oben rechts ein rotbewehrter und -bezungter goldener Löwe, oben links liegt in mit goldenen Kreuzchen bestreutem Feld ein schräggelegter, mit dem Bart nach oben gekehrter silberner Schlüssel, unten ein rot-silbernes Wolkenfeh.

The municipality's arms might in English heraldic language be described thus: Per fess, in chief per pale sable a lion rampant Or armed and langued gules and azure semé of crosses of the second a key per bend argent, the wards to chief and dexter, and in base vair nebuly argent and gules.

The Palatine Lion on the dexter (armsbearer's right, viewer's left) side and the key as a symbol of the bishop's office and Saint Peter's attribute on the sinister (armsbearer’s left, viewer’s right) side together stand for the condominium under which Electoral Palatinate and the Bishopric of Worms, whose patron saint was Peter, jointly held the local lordship for three centuries. The "vair nebuly" fur in the base of the escutcheon is meant to look like three complete and two cut-off silver helmets on a red background such as those once worn by the local resident lower nobility. These were called Eisenhüte (singular: Eisenhut; "iron hats").

In regional literature, the red background between the "helmets" is mistaken for "rooftiles". Further irritation having to do with the shield's lower half comes from the Großes Wappenbuch der Pfalz ("Great Arms Book of the Palatinate"), an official armorial directory which contains a version of Dirmstein's coat of arms – sometimes used officially – in which the "helmets" in the lower row and the background have their tinctures transposed, thus disturbing the harmonious change from silver to red fields, standing the lower helmets upside down, and arranging two of them in such a way that their bottoms touch those in the upper row in a straight line. An expert opinion obtained at the municipality's request showed in 2007 that the version seen in the Großes Wappenbuch der Pfalz was erroneous and did not match the historical example, whereupon the district administration issued the above-cited decree.

=== Municipal council ===
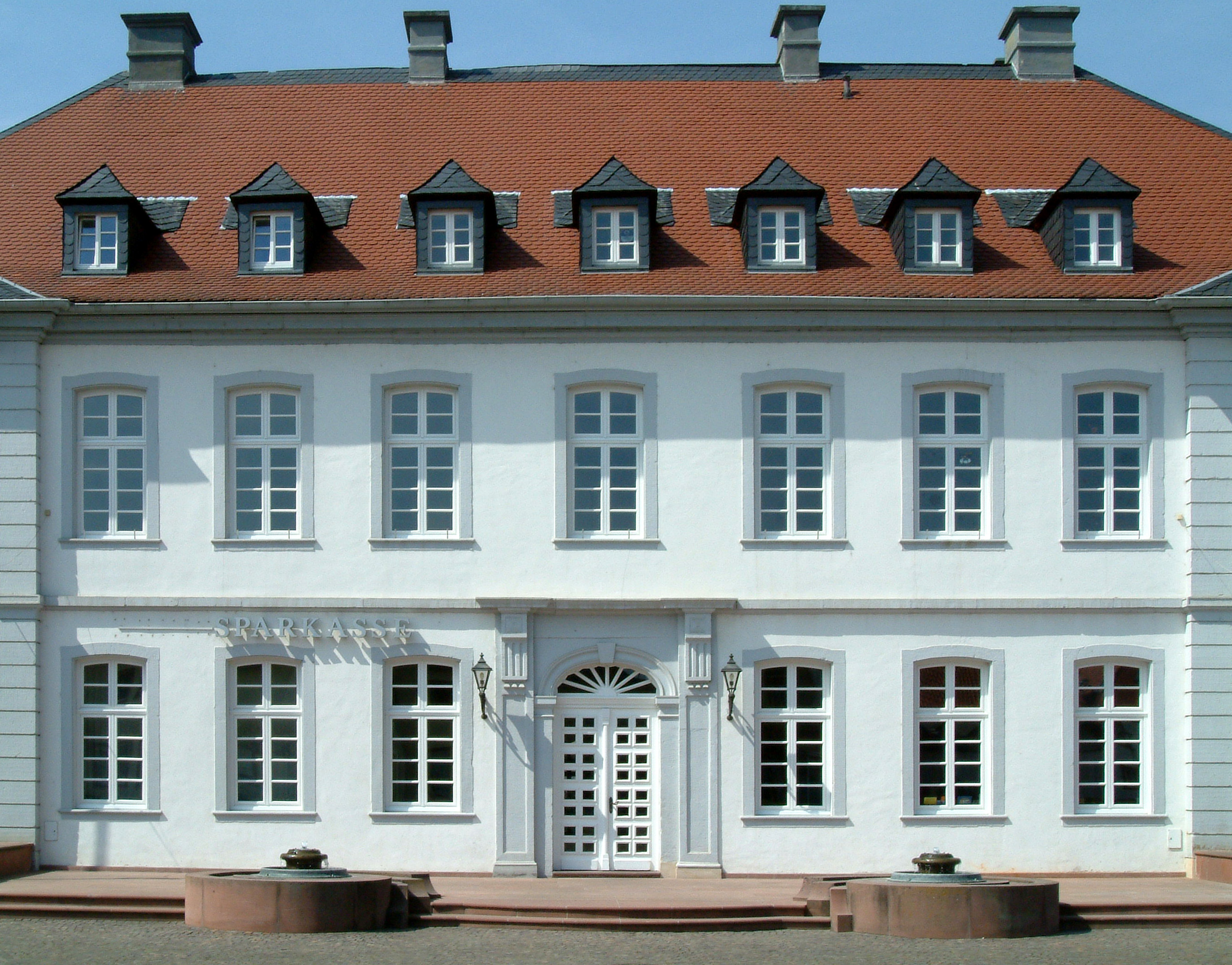
Town Hall: Sturmfedersches Schloss

Dirmstein belongs to the Verbandsgemeinde of Leiningerland. The mayor is Bernd Eberle (FWG), and the 20 seats on council are shared by three factions. The municipal election held on 7 June 2009 yielded the following results (with changes from 2004 results):

Municipal council election	Share	Percent	+/–	Seats	+/–
Eligible voters	2,391	100.0
Voters	1,597	66.8	+2.7
Invalid ballots	28	1.8	–0.8
Valid ballots	1,569	98.2	+0.8	20
SPD	364	23.2	–3.1	5	=
CDU	637	40.6	–10.5	8	–3
FWG	568	36.2	+13.5	7	+3

=== Mayors ===
This list of mayors since the Thirty Years' War is still incomplete; however, there are only a few gaps and lapses in clarity.

Mayors since 1900
Time	Mayor	Party
since 2009	Bernd Eberle	FWG
2004–2009	Jürgen Schwerdt	CDU
1994–2004	Werner Sauer	CDU
1986–1994	Friedrich Raster	SPD
1964–1986	Erich Otto	FWG
–1964	Philipp Hartmüller	
	David Fischer	
about 1950	Roland Bengel	
1945	Mattern	
1943–1945	Philipp Neuschäfer	NSDAP
1941–1943	Karl Schlösser	NSDAP
1937–1941	Heinrich Körber	NSDAP
1933–1937	Johann (Hans) Karl Becker	NSDAP
1931–1933	Dr. Lauterbach (?)	
1924–1931	Richard Römer	
1900–1924	Albert Römer	

Mayors before 1900
Time	Mayor
1894–(1900?)	Karl Witt
1884–1893	Dr. med. Heinrich Bennighof
1874–(1884?)	Abraham Janson
1868–1874	Gideon von Camuzi
about 1863	Johann Roos
about 1848	Christian Janson
about 1835/41	Roland Stocké I.
about 1833	Hartmüller
about 1823/25	Jacob Janson
1801–1815	Joseph von Camuzi
1793–(1801?)	Stephan Graeff
1792–1793	Philipp Roos
1784–1792	Johann Michael Graeff
–1782	Johann Michael Graeff
about 1772	Christian Sartor
–1761	Johann Grothe
about 1749/52	Georg Mappes
about 1741	Boetty
about 1717/37	Andres Einsel(e)
about 1671/72	Daniel Deimel/Deimling
about 1652	Hans Conrad Winter

== Culture and sightseeing ==
=== Monumental zone ===
The historic heart of the Upper Village represents in the monument protection authority's eyes quite a homogeneous monumental zone. It consists of Mitteltor, Affenstein, Laumersheimer Straße, Herrengasse, Kirchenstraße and Metzgergasse. At the Obertor ("Upper Gate"), and with the two park complexes, it reaches somewhat farther out. The village's appearance in this zone is mostly compact and is defined mainly by Late Baroque building from the decades that followed the great blaze in the Nine Years' War. It gives one the impression of a wealthy village characterized by the nobility's and the fashionable citizenry's buildings and that its structure even withstood the upheaval of the French Revolution.

The three castlelike manor houses preserved almost unscathed by time also convey the tradition of this village that was jointly ruled in the Middle Ages by noble families. Right near each other and both singular are the English Gardens in the Upper Village's northwest and south. Asserting itself as at least the architectural peer of the noble buildings is the simultaneous church from 1746, which with its tower dating from the Middle Ages and built even taller in 1904 on the one hand forms a structural midpoint in the municipality, and on the other hand reflects the religious relations of this village that was ruled for three centuries as an Electoral Palatinate-Worms condominium. Together with the former infirmary chapel across the street to the west, the church forms a homogeneous building group.

Typical for the town and country buildings that convey wealth within the monumental zone are buildings with hipped roofs with timber-frame construction upon walled ground floors, which mainly characterize the inner village. With structural elements such as hewn-stone pilasters, the lordly buildings clearly served as a model for some of the houses; the flawless execution documents the local stonemasons’ craftsmanship. The homesteads with buildings on two or three sides on Affenstein and Hauptstraße and on the eastern section of Metzgergasse, on the other hand, tell of the less wealthy class of the population.

One conspicuous gap in the otherwise cheek-by-jowl buildings came about in the 1960s on the corner of Marktstraße and Metzgergasse on the north side of the Castle Square (Schlossplatz) when the building that once housed the Worms Episcopal faïence factory was torn down. It had begun life as the Reigerspergischer Hof in 1592, and in 1689 it had withstood the great fire that had burnt the rest of the village down. Until its demolition, it was the village's oldest building. Since the foreseen replacement, a block of flats, was never built, the plot became a featureless carpark, mostly covered in gravel.

=== Buildings ===
==== Outstanding buildings in the monumental zone ====
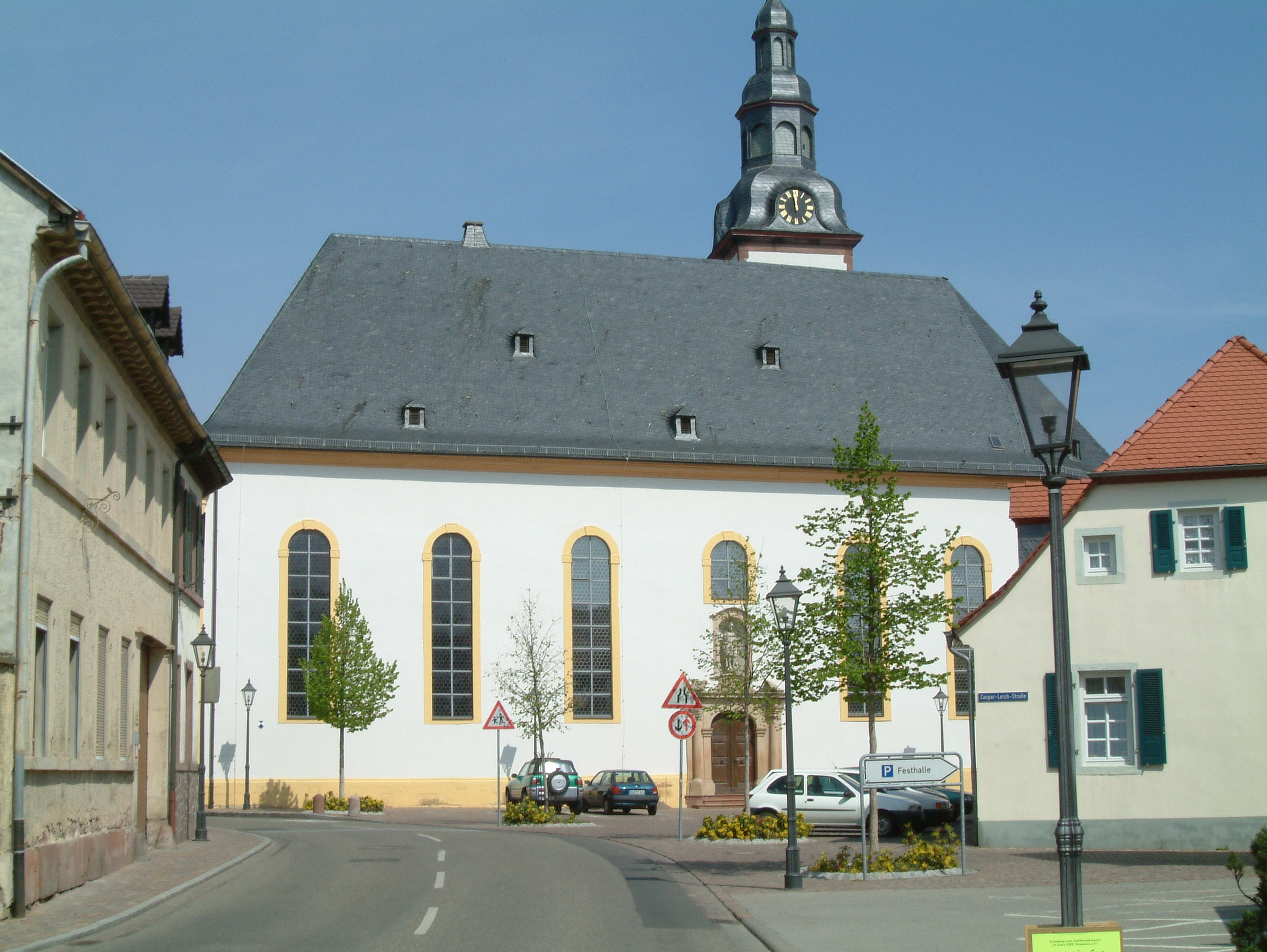
Laurentiuskirche

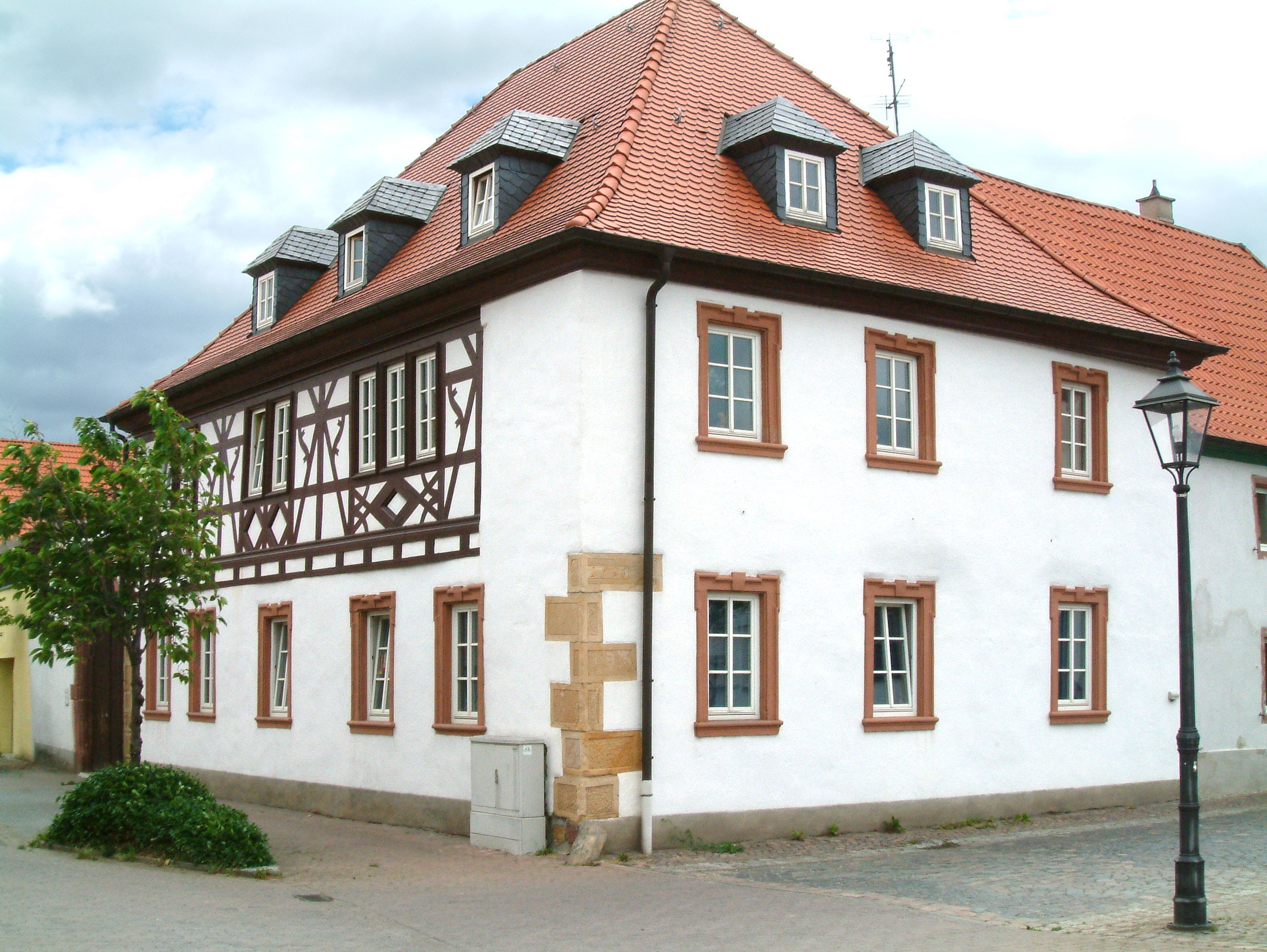
Dirmstein's oldest house

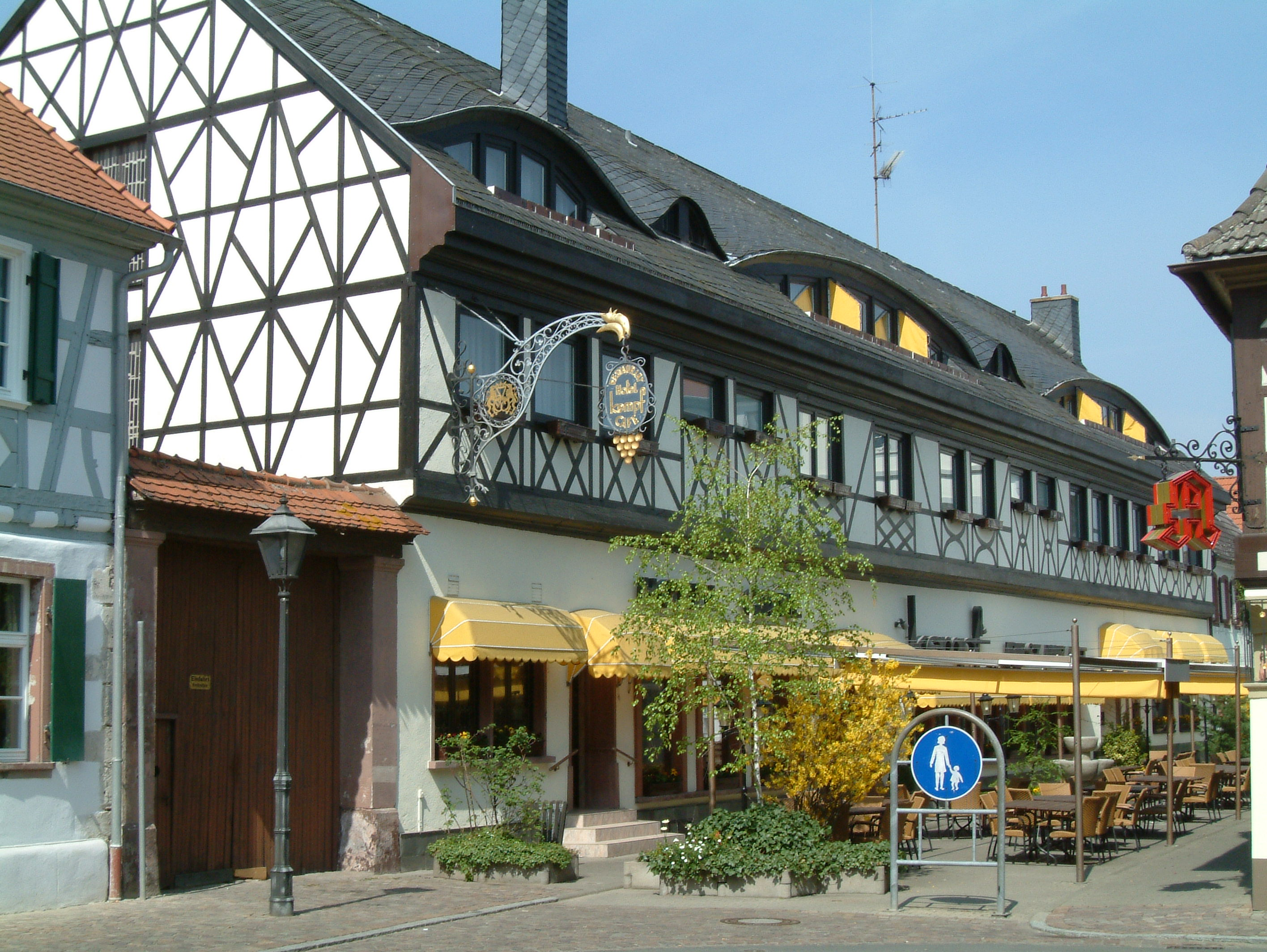
Café Kempf with Madonna figure

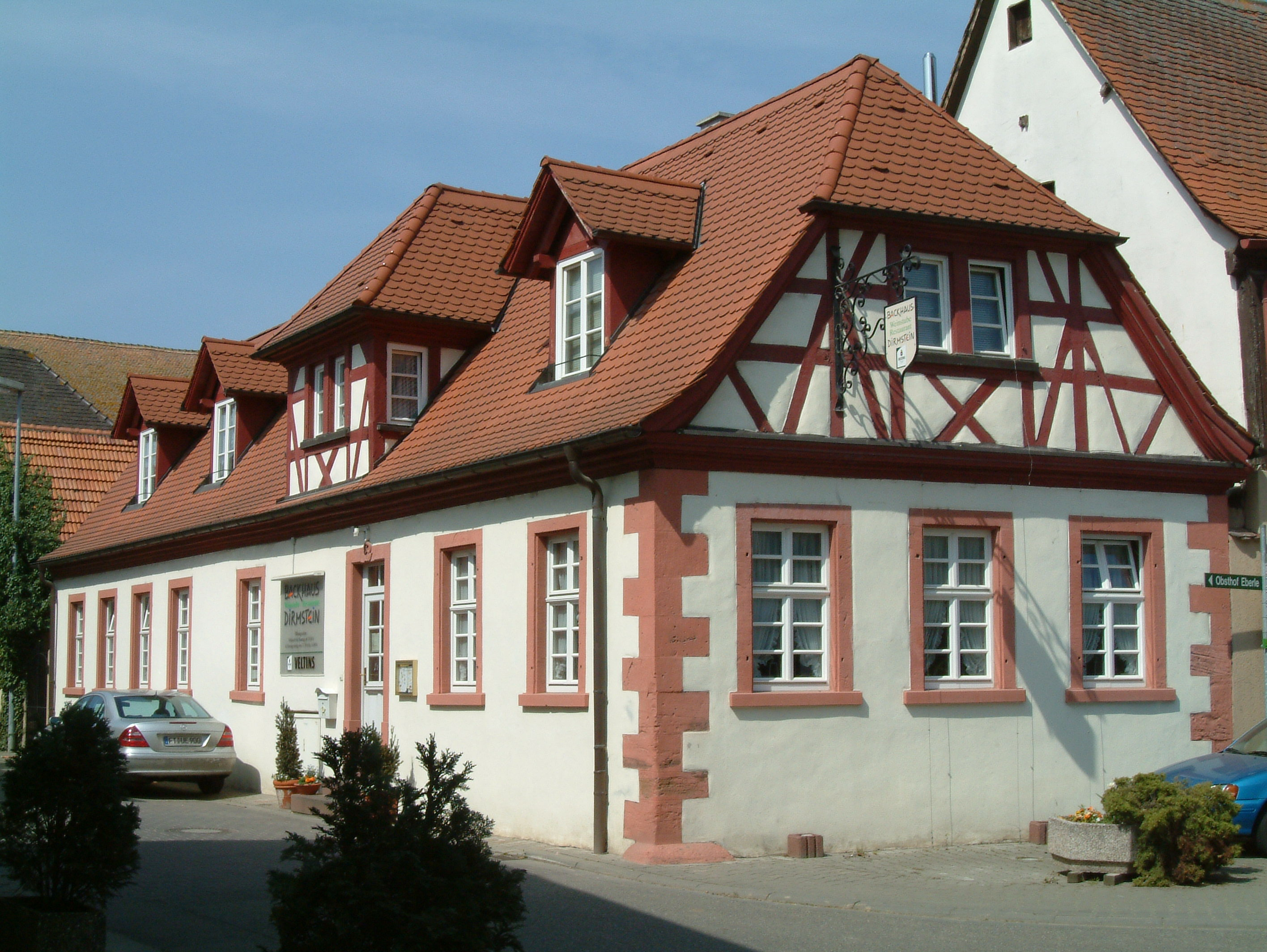
Bakehouse

Saint Lawrence's Church (Laurentiuskirche) was built as a simultaneous church during the Baroque era to master builder Balthasar Neumann’s plans, which were modified on site, beginning in 1742; it was consecrated in 1746. The Voit organ in the Catholic part of the church, built in 1900 and renovated in 1986, draws connoisseurs from far and wide. As well, the even older instrument in the Protestant part, which has at its disposal a work by Eberhard Friedrich Walcker, has a good reputation among experts. The Ältestes Haus – Dirmstein's "Oldest House" – stands at the corner of Metzgergasse and Salzgasse. Chiselled into it is the year 1596. In 1689, it was one of only six or seven buildings that were left standing after the French burnt the village down. It is now the only one left of those that escaped that blaze. At the turn of the millennium, it was attractively restored.

The Sturmfedersches Schloss and the Koeth-Wanscheidsches Schloss were the Sturmfeder and Koeth-Wanscheid noble families' castlelike manor houses, and have been restored.

Hardly any original trace is even left of the two monasteries, one Augustinian and the other Jesuit, that once stood side by side in the north of the village centre. On the site of the Augustinian monastery, the Quadtsches Schloss was later built, which nowadays incorrectly does business under the name Jesuitenhof ("Jesuit Estate"). Of the Jesuit monastery, which historians regard as the true Jesuitenhof, only an outbuilding is left of the original complex.

Across the street from the church in the Spitalhof, which used to be a hospice, and to which belongs the Gothic and now deconsecrated Kapelle St. Maria Magdalena, the municipal kindergarten is now housed.

The House at Marktstraße 1 was built in the early 18th century as a stone and timber-frame building. For model renovation, the owners were recognized in 2006 with the first Balthasar-Neumann-Preis of the Kulturverein St. Michael Dirmstein. The St.-Michael-Apotheke was likewise built in the early 18th century as a timber-frame building. The predecessor building in the Middle Ages contained a great hall in which the local nobles, who formed a condominium (or Ganerbschaft in German), held their meetings. The Altes Rathaus ("Old Town Hall") from 1714 is used as a "House of the Clubs", those being the ones who restored the building by doing unpaid work.

Marktstraße ("Market Street"), whose southernmost portion is laid out as "Germany's smallest pedestrian zone", runs between the Sturmfedersches Schloss and the Hotel Café Kempf – known locally as das Kempf – which after growing out of a winemaker's house in 1926 has taken back its place after a thorough renovation as the village's biggest gastronomic business and is also now quite eye-catching. In the front guestroom is found a Madonna figure from the 18th century which is under monumental protection. Functioning as a small, but fine, addition to the Café Kempf is the former Backhaus ("Bakehouse") around the corner on the way into Herrengasse, which has now been converted into a wine parlour. Newest among the village's leading restaurants is the Roosmarin, which was set up in an old winemaker's house in 2006 in the Lower Village, and whose name comes from the herb rosemary (Rosmarin in German) and the owner-operator's family name.

The Fechtschule ("Swordfighting School") stands south of the village centre at the edge of the Kellergarten. A predecessor building to this Classicist one, die Burg ("the Castle"), was from 1602 Caspar Lerch's house. For several decades, the Landesfechtschule des Südwestdeutschen Fechtverbandes ("State Swordfighting School of the Southwest German Swordfighting League") has been run there, leading to the building's current name. One peculiarity, also found on the grounds of the Kellergarten, is the Bathhouse of the Countess of Brühl, whose comital bathtub nowadays stands in the front garden as an oversize flowerpot.

==== Outstanding buildings outside the monumental zone ====
The Episcopal Palace (Bischöfliches Schloss), which had been the administrative and summer seat of the Prince-Bishop of Worms, near the village's eastern outskirts is the oldest, at least partly, preserved Schloss in Dirmstein. Of this – on the lands of what is now a farming estate – only a few original remnants can be found, however.

In the village for centuries were two mills that were run by water from the Eckbach. The Niedermühle ("Lower Mill") in the far east was converted in the 19th century into a farming estate in the Classicist style. The Spormühle in the village's southwest houses both an art gallery and a small country hotel.

=== Parks and graveyards ===
==== English gardens ====
The Schlosspark, laid out in the style of a landscaped English garden and renovated at the turn of the millennium, furnishes a venue for events, especially musical ones. It was planned beginning in 1824 by the landscape architect Johann Christian Metzger. In 2009 began restoration work on the grotto, which lies in the park and was built in 1840. Responsible, about 1790, for the Kellergarten, which is also undergoing renovations and is another of the once seven English gardens in the municipality, was Metzger's even more famous professional colleague Friedrich Ludwig von Sckell.

==== Graveyards ====
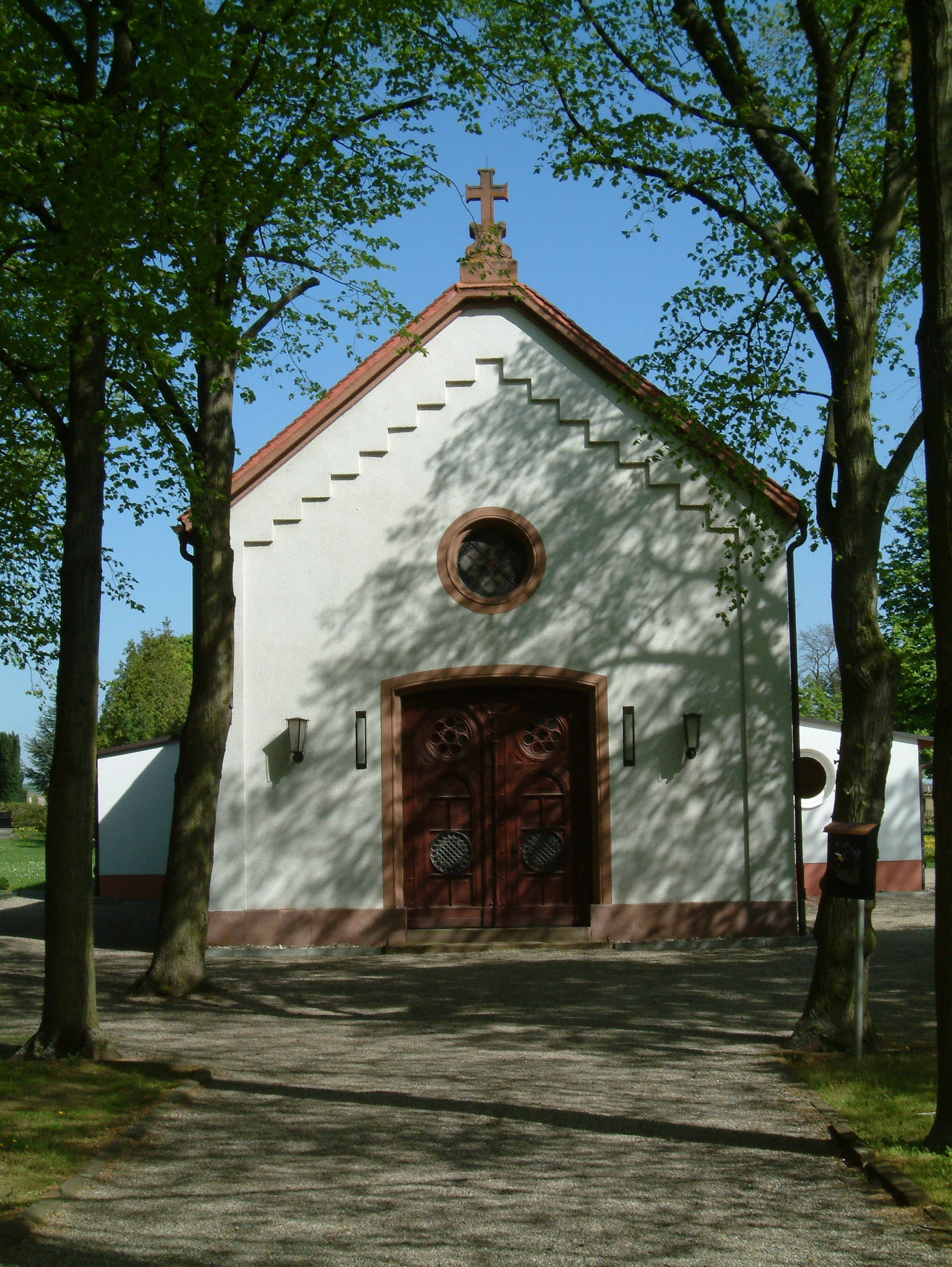
Friedhofskapelle

The early mediaeval grave fields mentioned earlier lay some 300 m north and northwest of the forks of the Eckbach and Floßbach, and therefore not far from the area where later arose the Lower Village. However, they could not be regarded as cemeteries laid out in an organized fashion.

Until about 1850, the village kept its graveyard in the east, in the Lower Village right next to Saint Peter's Church (Peterskirche) and near the Episcopal Palace. Since then it has not been used. The best known grave there is the one in which the physician Johann von Hubertus is buried.

The New Cemetery (Neuer Friedhof) now in use lies somewhat elevated on the village's northern edge, the village itself having spread out towards it. Many gravestones of value to cultural history from the 17th, 18th and 19th centuries were taken from the old cemetery and set up here. The chapel, in which a part of the original fresco has been restored, represents a Classicist building with a rectangular base from the mid-19th century and holds the burial vault of the noble Familie Camuzi, who endowed the chapel.

=== Natural monuments ===
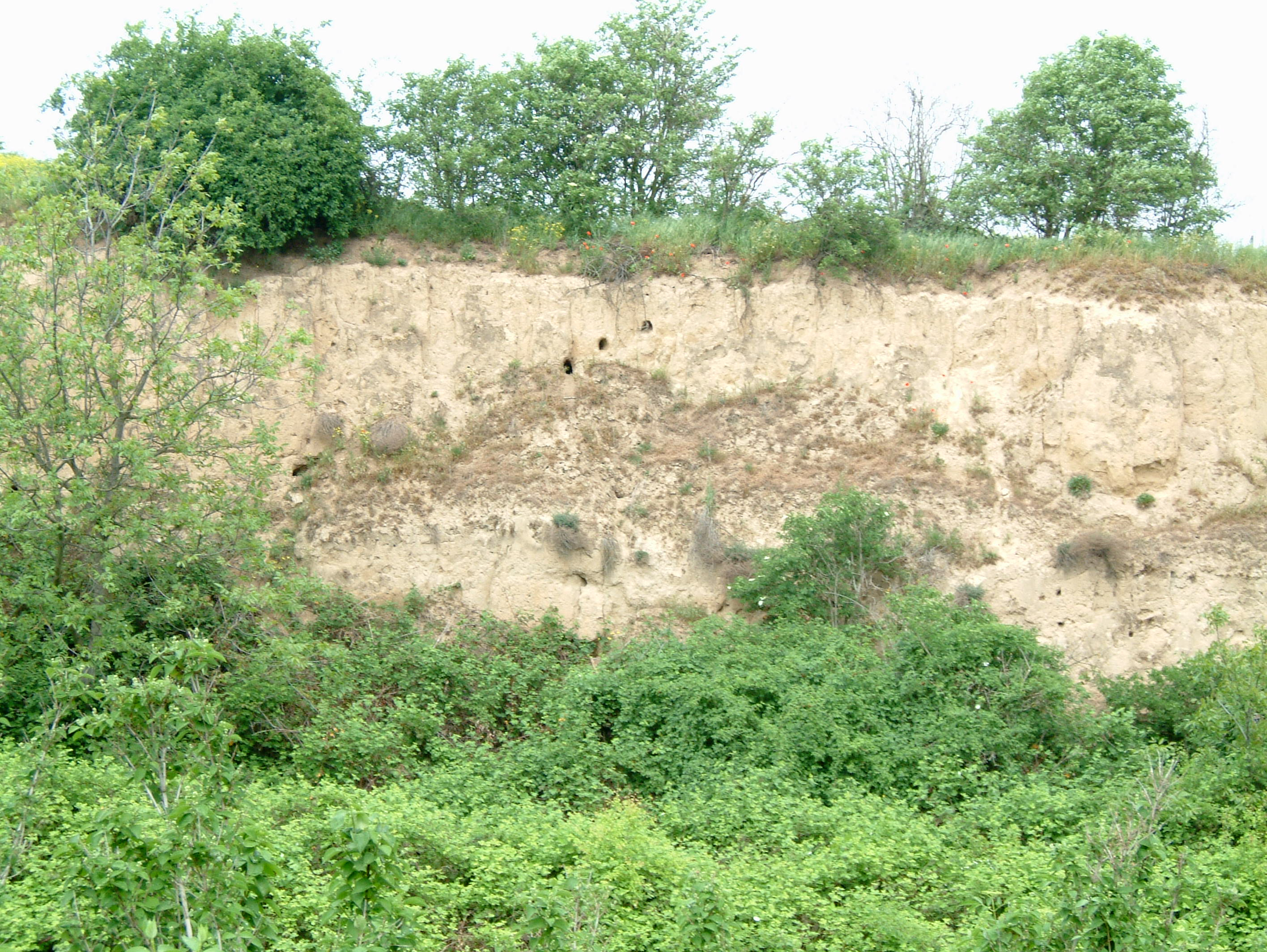
Loess wall at Obersülzer Straße

The area between the south corner of the Kellergarten and the Eckbach includes the Dicker Baum ("Fat Tree"), a roughly 200-year-old sycamore. With a trunk girth of some 6 m and a height of more than 20 m, the mighty tree is said to be a natural monument.

In the area of the road leading out of the village to the northwest (Obersülzer Straße) is a steep, south-facing loess wall, which stands as a biotope for many kinds of warmth-loving insects, among them solitary wild bees and digger wasps. Also, bird species that breed in hollows, such as the common swift, are observed. It is possible that even the European roller has settled here, although it is native to Southern Europe.

The Chorbrünnel-Rundweg (path) in the northwest of Dirmstein's municipal area links the Wörschberger Hohl, a holloway likewise marked by loess walls, with the Chorbrünnel. This little fountain is fed by a sulphur-bearing spring whose water was long used for healing purposes. In the Late Middle Ages, the fountain was set in stone by the resident Jesuit monks. In reference to this, the green signposts on the pathway show a yellowish-orange stone arcade together with the spring symbol.

The Eckbach Mill Path (Eckbachmühlen-Rad- und Wanderweg) leads out of Dirmstein up the Eckbach for more than 19 km to Altleiningen, linking 8 wine villages and the Eckbachweiher (pond). The area provides opportunities for outdoor recreation and contains 23 partially restored mill.

=== Regular events ===
==== Event venues ====
The many local clubs bring the municipality a well filled calendar of events. Above all, the Kulturverein St. Michael Dirmstein (cultural club) busies itself in many fields and invites the public to appearances by its historical dance troupe, to literary evenings and music at the Schlosspark. Bigger events are held at the Unterhaardter Festhalle (UHF), which stands south of Saint Lawrence's Church on the edge of the village centre and can seat several hundred visitors. It was structurally and technologically refurbished by unpaid helpers at the onset of the new millennium. For events with no more than 80 to 100 visitors, the Eux-Stocké-Ratssaal is available at the Sturmfedersches Schloss. Specially for organ music, Saint Lawrence's Church (Laurentiuskirche) offers itself up with its two historic instruments, the Walcker organ from 1869 and the Voit organ from 1900.

==== Concerts ====
In the Council Chamber (the Ratssaal mentioned above), where a Bechstein grand piano is also available, concerts are held. Among the venues for the German-French concert series "Printemps Rhénan – Rheinischer Frühling" (both of which mean "Rhenish Spring" in French and German respectively) is Saint Lawrence's Church.

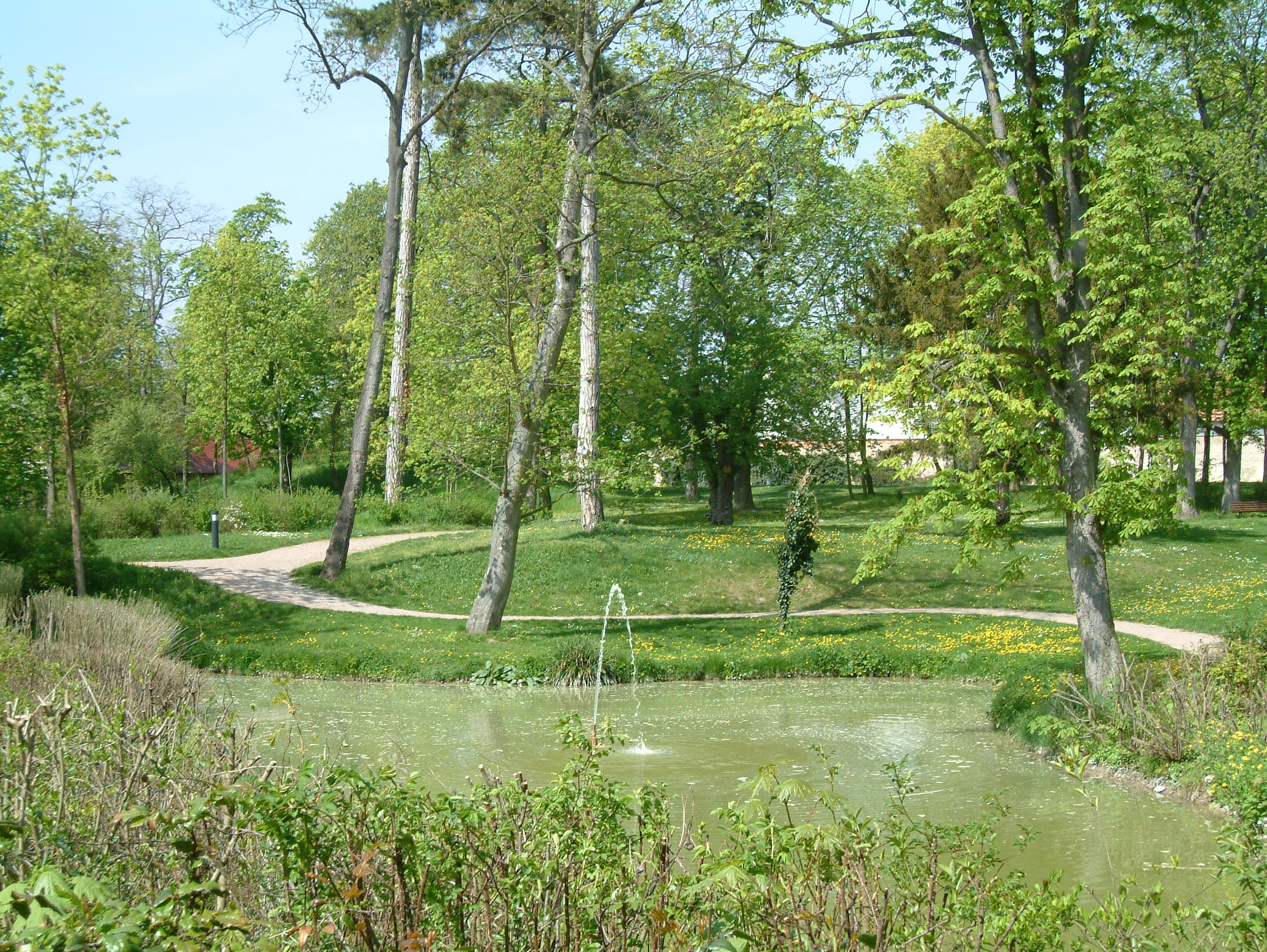
Schlosspark

At the Schlosspark, an outdoor concert of the "palatiajazz" series is held every year at which the original Blues Brothers Band, Branford Marsalis and Cassandra Wilson have appeared.

Felix Hell, the concert organist who was born in Frankenthal and now lives in the United States, comes back to Dirmstein each New Year to give a New Year's Eve concert at Saint Lawrence's Church.

==== Literary readings ====
In Dirmstein a variety of Vorderpfälzisch (Eastern Palatine German) belonging to the Palatine German dialect group is spoken. The fostering of the local speech is taken very seriously in the municipality: several writers who were born here or who have settled here are among the prizewinners at the Palatine dialectal poetry contests and are continually giving readings in the Council Chamber, where there are also literary events dealing with High German.

==== Folk festivals ====
The Dirmsteiner Jahrmarkt (yearly market) each year on the second weekend in September and the Bayerische Bierfest ("Bavarian Beer Festival") every other year together with the Bavarian partner municipality, Neuötting, see to it that the bow-shaped, paved Schlossplatz as well as the wine parlours and wineries are thickly populated. The Schlossparkfest, which has already been held several times at the height of summer, has likewise established itself as a magnet for the public.

=== Education ===
==== Kindergarten ====
The municipality has at its disposal the Catholic kindergarten "St. Laurentius" and the municipal daycare centre "Himmelszelt" ("Heaven’s Tent"). Both have two groups and all-day places. At the "Himmelszelt", there are also places for four two-year-olds.

==== Primary school and sport hall ====
Dirmstein is the location of a two-stream primary school, which offers all-day care. Next to the school stands an "all-purpose sport hall", which is also available for regional events.

==== Music school ====
The Sturmfedersches Schloss harbours the only branch location of the Musikschule Leiningerland, whose seat is in Grünstadt.

==== Youth room ====
With significant dedication by the Landjugend Dirmstein ("Dirmstein Country Youth"), which belongs to the Bund der Deutschen Landjugend ("League of German Country Youth"), a Jugendraum ("youth room") was created in 1997 and 1998 at the Old Town Hall to look like an Internet café. Besides individually and collectively possible leisure activities, work is also done there for the community in which a volunteer team of interested youth build the municipality's website.

==== Adult education ====
Education for adults is offered by the local folk high school, which is integrated into the district folk high school (Kreisvolkshochschule Bad Dürkheim). Classes are held at, among other places, the Sturmfedersches Schloss.

==== Public library ====
At the Sturmfedersches Schloss is found the central public library for the Verbandsgemeinde of Leiningerland.

=== Sport ===
Six sport clubs offer opportunities in their respective activities:

==== Fencing ====
The FC Dirmstein governs the Landesfechtschule des Südwestdeutschen Fechtverbandes ("State Swordfighting School of the Southwest German Swordfighting League"). It is run in the location of Caspar Lerch's former home on the Kellergarten.

==== Football and gymnastics ====
The TuS Dirmstein 1946 has 491 members. It maintains football for youth, active people and AH (Alte Herren – "Old Gentlemen") and it also offers women gymnastics. Its sport facilities together with its clubhouse lie on the village's southern outskirts.

==== Football golf ====
The 1. Deutsche Fußballgolf-Club Dirmstein was founded in 2006 as the first German sport club that occupies itself with the fad sport of Soccergolf or Fußballgolf. The club has 60 members. Laid out in the south of the village is a 6 ha area called Soccerpark Dirmstein. In 2008, it was the only such place anywhere in Germany. In 2009, the Dirmsteiner Alex Kober became in Bodenkirchen-Willaberg the German Soccergolf Champion. In the same year, the European Championship was played on the Dirmstein course, and the winner was another Dirmsteiner, Hans-Peter Baudy.

==== Tennis ====
The TC Grün-Weiß Dirmstein was founded in 1979 and has 230 members. It has at its disposal on the village's southern outskirts a tennis complex with eight sand courts and a club pub.

==== Table tennis ====
The TTC Dirmstein was founded in 1997 and has 65 members. It maintains three men's table tennis teams and a student team.

==== Turnen–Spiel–Gymnastik ====
The TSG Dirmstein 1986 has 466 members. It has at its disposal a broad offering with respect to gymnastics, fitness, aerobics and the like.

== Economy and infrastructure ==
=== Economic trends ===
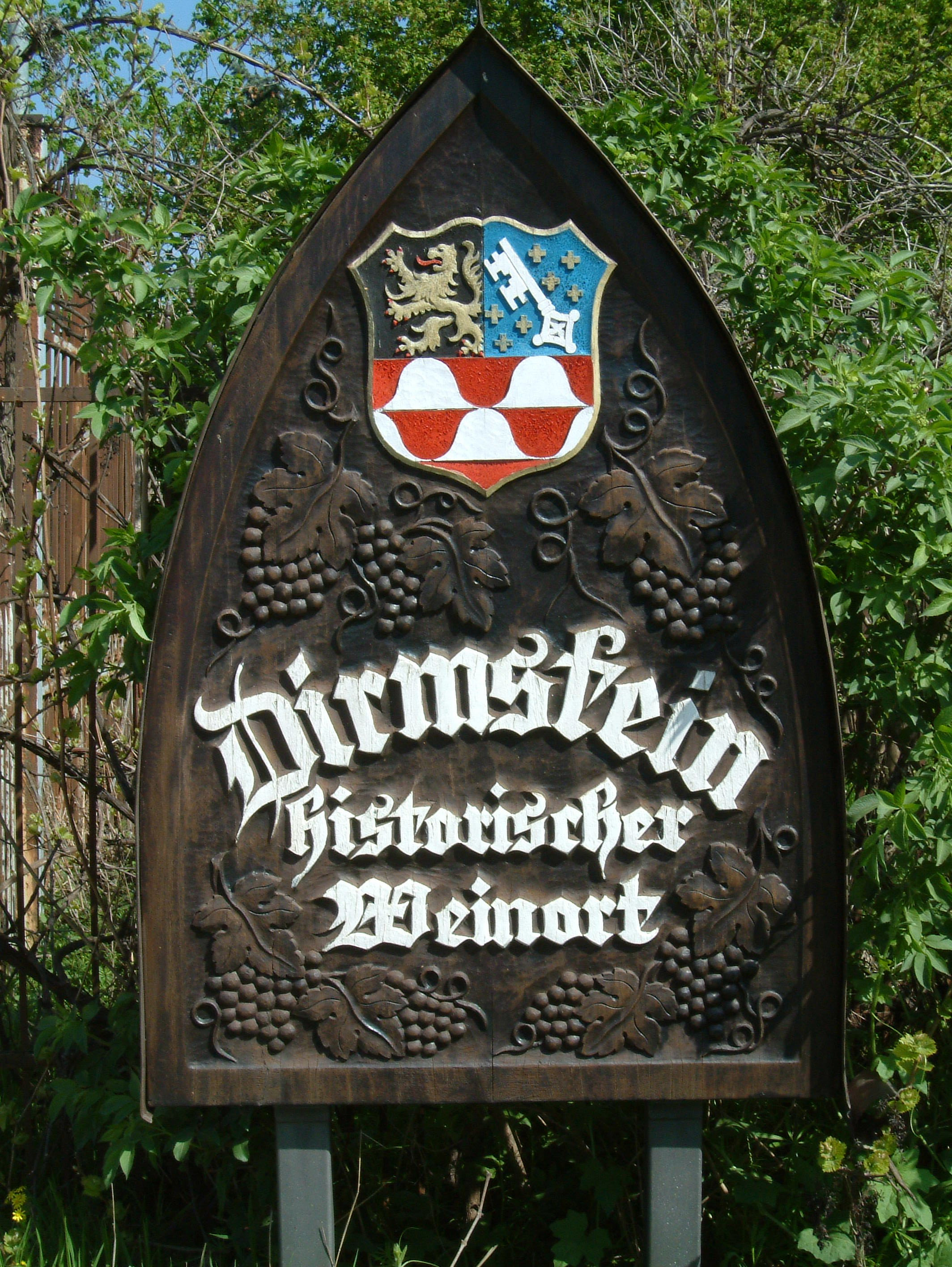
Entrance to the village

After the Second World War, Dirmstein grew from a municipality purely based on agriculture into a place in which as well as agriculture – and here this means mainly winegrowing – service industries, too, stand as equally important. Today there are more than 200 registered commercial operations. These are all small and medium-sized businesses; big business is wholly missing. For this reason, many Dirmsteiners commute to other places, which owing to the very tight economic interdependence in the Rhine-Neckar urban agglomeration is less difficult than in structurally weaker areas. Jobs lie mostly within 5 to 25 km.

Dirmstein has since the 1960s also been opening up to tourism. The village was advertised at first as the "Pearl of the Unterhaardt", and beginning in 1972 as the "Pearl of the Leiningerland". After the municipal council gave the mayor's slogan – "Pearl between Worms and Wine Route" – its blessing in 2005, this decision was revised in 2009; Dirmstein once again advertises itself as the "Pearl of the Leiningerland". In 2006, a private investor opened Soccerpark Dirmstein on the village's southern outskirts which quickly became a considerable economic factor in the municipality.

=== Winegrowing ===
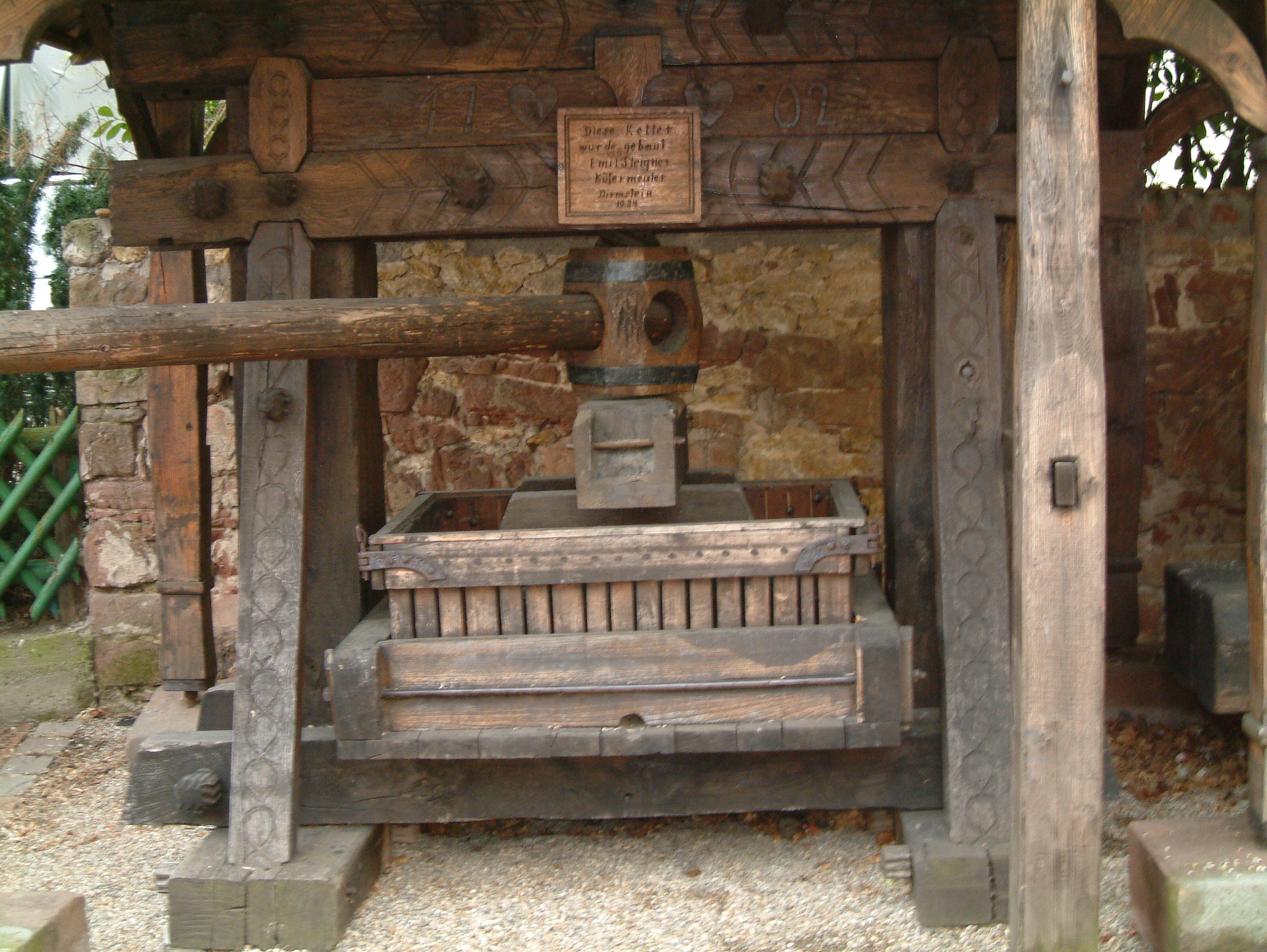
Winepress, replica 1984

Dirmstein is part of the Palatinate wine region. As early as Roman times, wine was being grown in the Eastern Palatinate. Winegrowing in Dirmstein had its first documentary mention in 1141. The Leiningerland's sunny climate also favours the production of Qualitätsweine in Dirmstein.

Roughly 2.5 of the municipality's 14.67 km^{2} is planted with grapes. The most commonly grown varieties are Riesling, Blauer Portugieser and Dornfelder. Also worthy of mention are Pinot noir, Pinot gris and Pinot blanc. Since 2003, a local winery has been successfully cultivating the variety Muscat Blanc à Petits Grains, which originally came from Asia Minor and is actually regarded as a warmth-loving Mediterranean plant.

Dirmstein's many former Weinlagen (vineyard sites) were consolidated into three Einzellagen (single vineyard sites) following the adoption of the 1971 Wine Law: Herrgottsacker ("Lord God’s Field", in the north), Mandelpfad ("Almond Path", in the west) and Jesuitenhofgarten. This last one, a slope leaning gently to the south, lies north of the centre right in the village and by area is one of Germany's smallest. All Dirmstein's single vineyard sites belong to the collective vineyard site – Großlage – of Schwarzerde ("Black Earth").

A part of the Mandelpfad single vineyard site is classified as a Große Lage, the highest level, by the grower organisation VDP. This sub-vineyard is referred to as Himmelsrech, but the official name of the entire vineyard is Dirmsteiner Mandelpfad.

At the edge of the south church square stands a great wooden winepress that was replicated by master cooper Emil Steigner; it also works.

=== Other economic fields ===
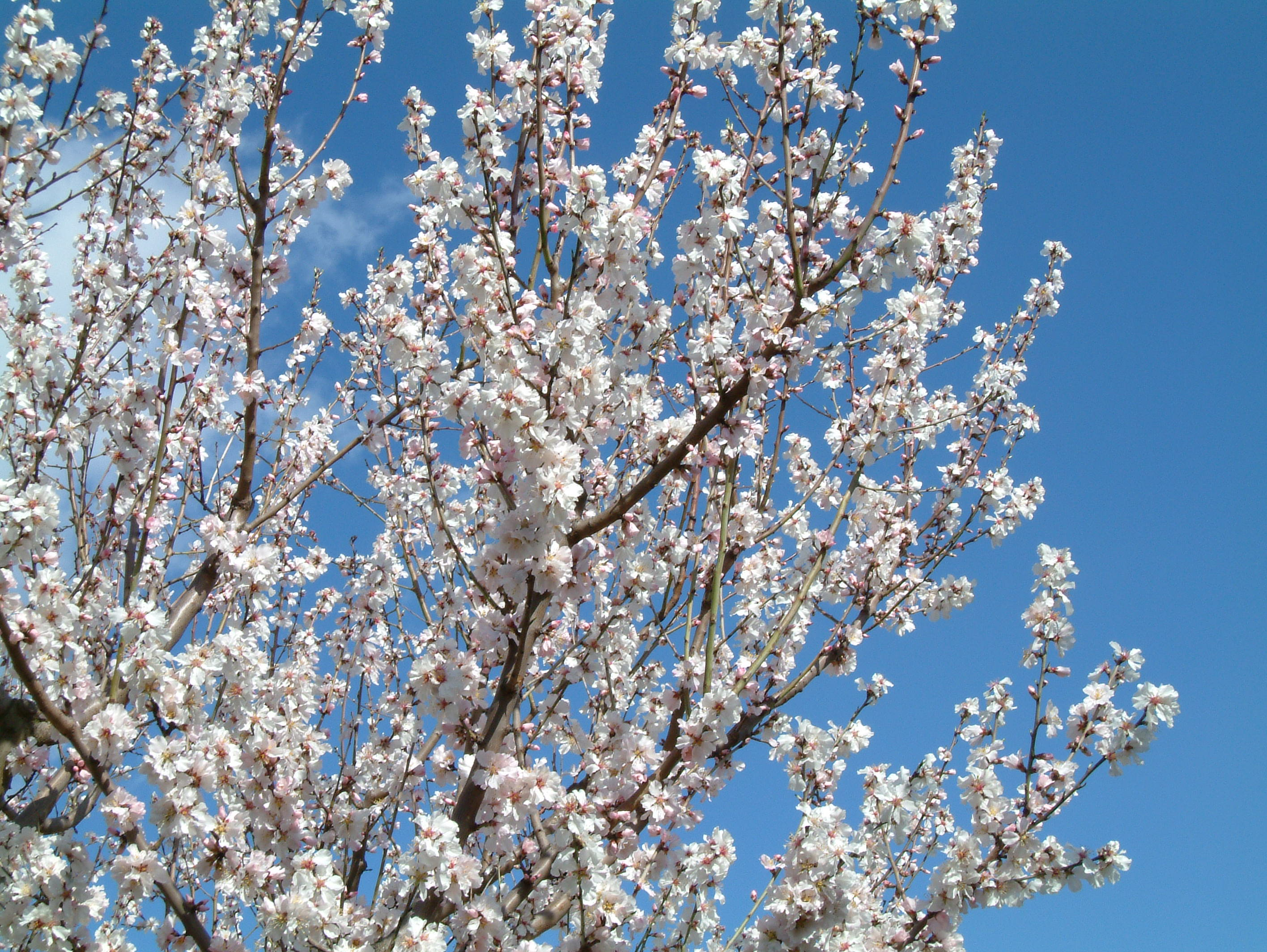
Almond blossoms in Dirmstein

Besides winegrowing, fruitgrowing, especially apples, holds some importance in Dirmstein. The fruit is used mainly to make fruit brandies. Almonds and figs, on the other hand, are only of slight economic importance. A typical seasonal vegetable is asparagus, which is grown in the flatter parts of the Dirmstein municipal area in the east. Spreading out there are mainly grain and potato fields. Through the municipality, coming from the neighbouring district, the Rhein-Pfalz-Kreis (which is known as "Germany’s Vegetable Garden"), runs a branch of the Deutsche Grumbeer- und Gemüsestraße. This means "German Potato and Vegetable Road", although Grumbeer is a dialect word for the potato (the standard German word is Kartoffel).

=== Transport ===
==== Road transport ====
Dirmstein is not connected to the Autobahn A 6 (Mannheim–Saarbrücken) which runs by one kilometre to the south, but rather to Landesstraße 453, which runs somewhat parallel thereto, linking Frankenthal (in the east) with Grünstadt (in the west). On the edge of each town are the nearest interchanges. Towards the southwest, Landesstraße 455 forms a link to the town of Freinsheim, and towards the north, by way of Offstein, another with the Alzey-Worms district. Kreisstraße 24 leads south to the neighbouring municipality of Gerolsheim. With the Autobahn A 61 (Koblenz–Speyer), which two kilometres southeast of the municipality crosses the A 6 at the Autobahnkreuz Frankenthal, there is no direct connection.

The missing link to the Autobahn network means that there is rather heavy traffic running through the municipality. Construction measures undertaken in the late 1990s in two places on Landesstraße 453 have at least somewhat lessened the problem of speeding within the municipality.

There are two bus routes run by the Verkehrsverbund Rhein-Neckar (VRN) that practically provide hourly service to the railway stations at Grünstadt (some 7 km) and Frankenthal (some 10 km). For evenings and late at night there has been since September 2006 a callable taxi service to and from the railway stations in Frankenthal and Kirchheim an der Weinstraße, which likewise accepts VRN tickets.

==== Rail transport ====
Dirmstein no longer has a railway connection. For almost half a century, the village lay on the Lokalbahn, a one-track, narrow-gauge (1 000 mm) railway. This ran beginning on 1 July 1891 from Frankenthal station, where there was a link to the Deutsche Reichsbahn, westwards by way of Heßheim and Dirmstein to Großkarlbach. The stations, which were all built in the same style – red-brown brick buildings – are in part still preserved today, like the one in Dirmstein, and are used as dwellings. Besides the old railway station itself, two streets – Bahnhofstraße ("Railway Station Street") and Lokalbahnstraße – today still recall the line, which was closed on 14 May 1939.

=== Media ===
For the municipality the Frankenthal local edition (Frankenthaler Zeitung) of the daily newspaper Die Rheinpfalz applies. Weekly, the public journal of the Verbandsgemeinde of Leiningerland appears, as do three advertising fliers – one from Frankenthal, two from Grünstadt. Since the 1980s, one party's local branch publishes at irregular intervals the local newspaper De Michel; the Palatine title refers on the one hand to the Michelstor as one of the village's landmarks, and on the other hand refers to the Deutscher Michel.

== Famous people ==
=== Honorary citizens ===
- Dr. rer. pol. Eux Stocké (b. 1895 in Dirmstein; d. 1992 in Rödental), entrepreneur and patron, named an honorary citizen in 1976. The Eux-Stocké-Ratssaal (council chamber) is dedicated to him.
- Erich Otto (b. 26 September 1921 in Dirmstein; d. 1 June 1992 in Dirmstein), mayor 1964–86, named an honorary citizen in 1997. Erich-Otto-Weg is dedicated to him.

=== Sons and daughters of the town ===
- Caspar Lerch II (b. after 1480; d. 7 or 17 August 1548), was in 1523 supporter of the rebellious knight Franz von Sickingen and was in 1539 through the expansion of the Spitalhof founder of today's Hospitalstiftung Dirmstein (foundation).
- Caspar Lerch IV (b. 13 December 1575; d. 1642 in Mainz), Caspar Lerch II's grandson, was Chamberlain to the Bishop of Speyer, Electorate of Mainz Amtmann in Tauberbischofsheim and Director of the Knighthood of the Upper Rhine (Oberrheinische Ritterschaft). A street in the village is named for him.
- Franz Rothermel (b. 1690/91; d. 1759), was the executive entrepreneur in the building of Saint Lawrence's Church (Laurentiuskirche, 1742–46); from him came the third and final floor plan. His house, built in the 1730s was from 2006 to 2008 restored.
- Johann Hubertus (b. 10 December 1752; d. 1823), surgeon, was professor of medicine at the Josephs-Akademie in Vienna and personal physician to Austrian Archduke Karl in Brussels.
- Franz Balthasar Hubertus (b. 19 April 1766; d. 9 April 1832 in Pressburg), was like his brother Johann a physician in Austria.
- Joseph Bihn (b. 2 January 1822; d. 1893 in Tiffin, Ohio), Catholic priest, was the founder of an order in the USA.
- Adolf Römer (b. 21 September 1843; d. 27 April 1913 in Erlangen), Professor of Classical Philology at the University of Erlangen, was a member of the Bavarian Academy of Sciences
- Friedrich Streiff (b. 16 October 1846; d. 5 August 1920), master carpenter, was a draughtsman of contemporary perspectives of Dirmstein.
- Friedrich Bengel (b. 6 October 1892; d. 23 August 1985), non-commissioned officer, was awarded the Bavarian Medal of Bravery in the First World War for averting an explosive accident.
- Arthur Maurer (b. 19 April 1929) is a local historian as well as the initiator and honorary chairman of the Kulturverein St. Michael Dirmstein and was awarded the Pin of Honour of the State of Rhineland-Palatinate.
- Josef Schmitt (b. 11 June 1929; d. 6 September 1995), was a Palatine painter.
- Alexander Schroth (b. 6 February 1934; d. 18 November 2011) was a Palatine dialectal poet and twice won the Palatine Dialectal Poetry Contest in Bockenheim.
- Walter Landin (b. 29 May 1952; d. 28 October 2021) was a Palatine dialectal poet, crime novel and theatre writer.

=== Famous people associated with the municipality ===
- Gideon von Camuzi (1799–1879), estate owner, was from 1843 to 1845 member of the chamber of representatives of the Kingdom of Bavaria and from 1868 to 1874 mayor.
- Joseph von Camuzi (1767–1828), estate owner and Gideon's father, was from 1801 to 1815 mayor and from 1816 member of the chamber of representatives of the Kingdom of Bavaria.
- Louis Coblitz (1814–1863), was a genre painter, who in Dirmstein mainly painted views of the Schlosspark.
- Lydia Hauenschild (b. 1957 in Deggendorf), writer, lives in Dirmstein.
- Jakob von Helmstatt (1500?–1560), as Electoral-Palatine Amtmann lived in house no. 46 on Vordergasse (lane) "with an oriel and six columns".
- Johann Jakob Hemmer (1733–1790), natural scientist and linguistic researcher, taught as house teacher for the Dirmstein noble family Sturmfeder, before reaching through this connection the Mannheim court of Elector Carl Theodor.
- David Hirsch (b. 15 May 1928 in Mainz; d. March 2019 in Buenos Aires), grew up in Dirmstein. As a Jew in Nazi times, he was deported as a twelve-year-old to the south of France, whence he fled to Switzerland. Having lived in Argentina since 1947, he reestablished contact with his hometown about 2000, and then visited several times; in 2009 he attended the laying of the Stolpersteine.
- Albert H. Keil (b. 1947 in Mußbach), Palatine dialectal poet, literature prizewinner and three-time winner of the Palatine Dialectal Poetry Contest, lives in Dirmstein.
- Friedrich Klingmann (1874–1947), enologist, grapegrower and agricultural councillor, founded in 1924 the Rebenveredelungsanstalt Dirmstein ("Vine Ennobling Institute"), whose name was later changed to Weinbauversuchsanstalt ("Winegrowing Experimental Institute"). Rat-Klingmann-Weg (street) is dedicated to him.
- Rüdiger Kramer (b. 1953 in Frankenthal), dialectal writer and author, winner of the theatre prize of the town of Frankenthal in 2007, lives in Dirmstein.
- Dr. rer. nat. Otfried K. Linde (b. 1932 in Sandersleben; d. 2019), psychiatric natural science writer, co-publisher of documentation about crimes against psychiatric patients in the Third Reich, lived in Dirmstein.

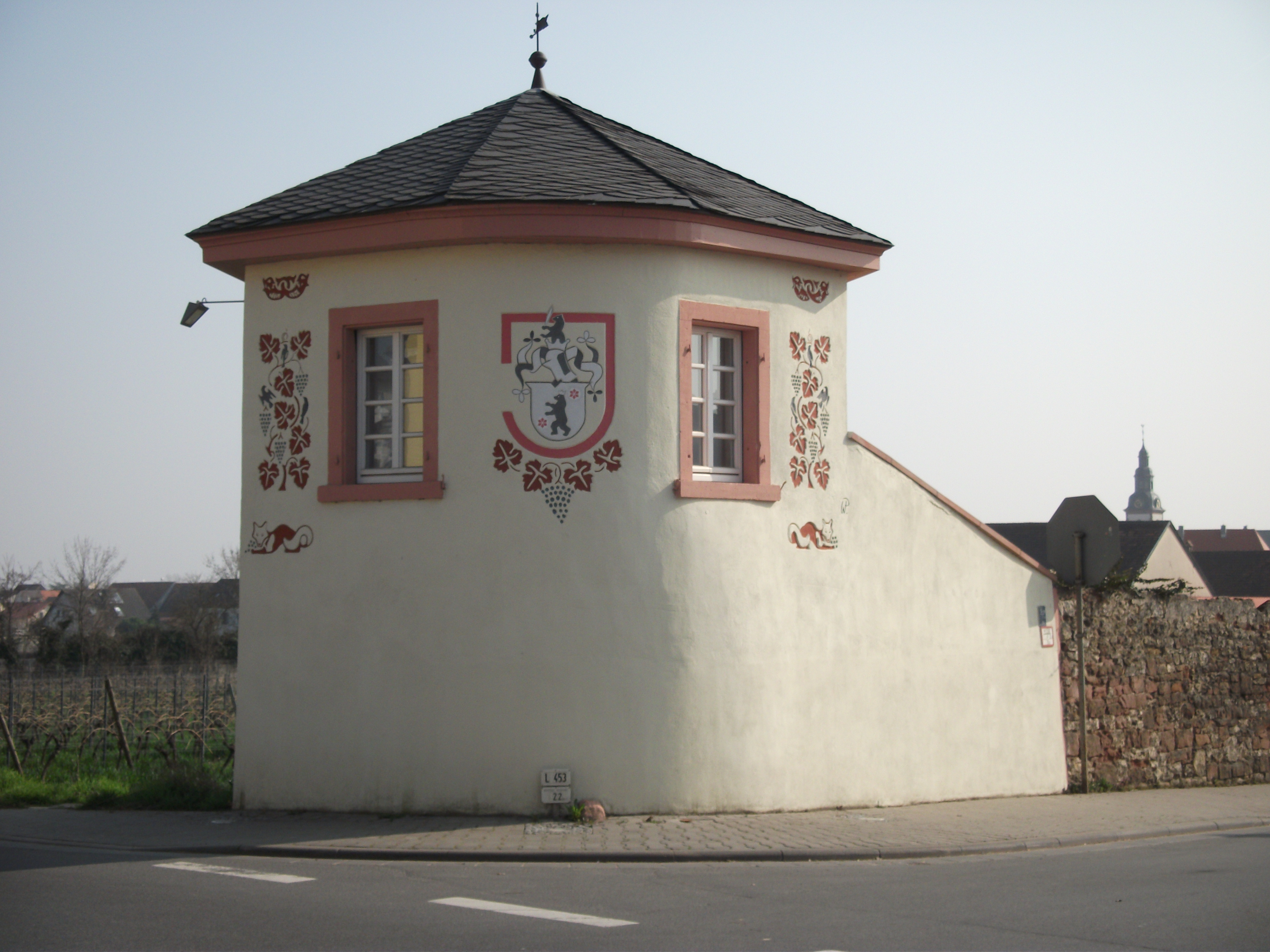
Garden pavilion painted by Walter Perron (image from 2014 after the restoration)

- Dr. phil. Michael Martin (b. 1947 in Baden-Baden), town archivist of Landau, organized in years-long work the Dirmstein municipal archive and is publisher of the local chronicle.
- Balthasar Neumann (1687–1753) was court master builder and drew up in 1740 and 1741 the first two building plans for Saint Lawrence's Church.
- Balthasar Nick (1678–1749), master builder, church builder Franz Rothermel's father-in-law, founded a building company in Dirmstein.
- Andrea Odermann née Schmitt (b. 1974 in Grünstadt), grew up in Dirmstein and was in 1994 and 1995 Wine Countess of the Leiningerland as well as Palatine Wine Princess in 1995 and 1996.
- Walter Perron (b. 1895; d. 1970 in Frankenthal), painter and sculptor, lived for a while in Dirmstein and about 1950 furnished a garden pavilion from the 19th century with sgraffito wall covering. Restoration work on the pavilion began in 2006.
- Sigismund Ranqué (b. 1743 in Ballenberg, today Ravenstein; d. 1795), composer and presumably a pupil of Ignaz Holzbauer, was beginning in 1764 schoolmaster and organist in Dirmstein.
- Helmut Ried (b. 1936 in Ludwigshafen am Rhein), painter, lives in Dirmstein.
- Wolfgang Wilhelm von Rießmann, Baden-Durlach court adviser and owner of the Koeth-Wanscheidsches Schloss, distinguished himself by becoming the main sponsor for the decoration of the Protestant part of Saint Lawrence's Church. The municipality has dedicated Hofrat-Rießmann-Straße (street) to him.
- Franz Rothermel (1690/91–1759), master builder, was as Balthasar Nick's son-in-law the entrepreneur who undertook to build Saint Lawrence's Church (Laurentiuskirche) in 1742–46; the third and permanent footprint was his. His house, built in the 1730s, was restored between 2006 and 2008.
- Dieter Sarreither (b. 1951), mathematician and Volkswirt ("national economist"), since 2015 president of the Federal Statistics Office (Statistisches Bundesamt) and federal election supervisor, grew up in Dirmstein.
- Friedrich Schenck (1790–1868), Grand-Ducal Hessian Court Counsellor of Justice and amateur painter, in 1866 created a number of watercolours with views of the Sturmfederscher Kellergarten (an English landscape garden) that served as a model for the park's restoration in 2006–2009.
- Klaus Schneider (b. 10 October 1958), president of the Deutscher Weinbauverband (DWV; German Winegrowing Association).
- Franz Georg von Schönborn (1682–1756), Imperial Count, Elector, Prince-Bishop of Trier and Worms, had Saint Lawrence's Church (Laurentiuskirche) built at his Dirmstein summer seat. Graf-Schönborn-Straße (street) is dedicated to him.
- Georg von Schönenberg (1530–1595), Prince-Bishop of Worms, undertook his official duties in the summer from the Dirmstein Episcopal Residence.
- Cyril William Sibley (1923–1945), Royal Air Force sergeant, was murdered by the Nazis shortly before the end of the Second World War. In 2009 a Stolperstein was dedicated to him.
- Erwin Spuler (b. 1906 in Augsburg; d. 1964 in Cros-de-Cagnes [in the South of France, while travelling]), painter, ceramic artist, draughtsman, graphic artist, lived for several years in his youth in Dirmstein, where his mother came from.

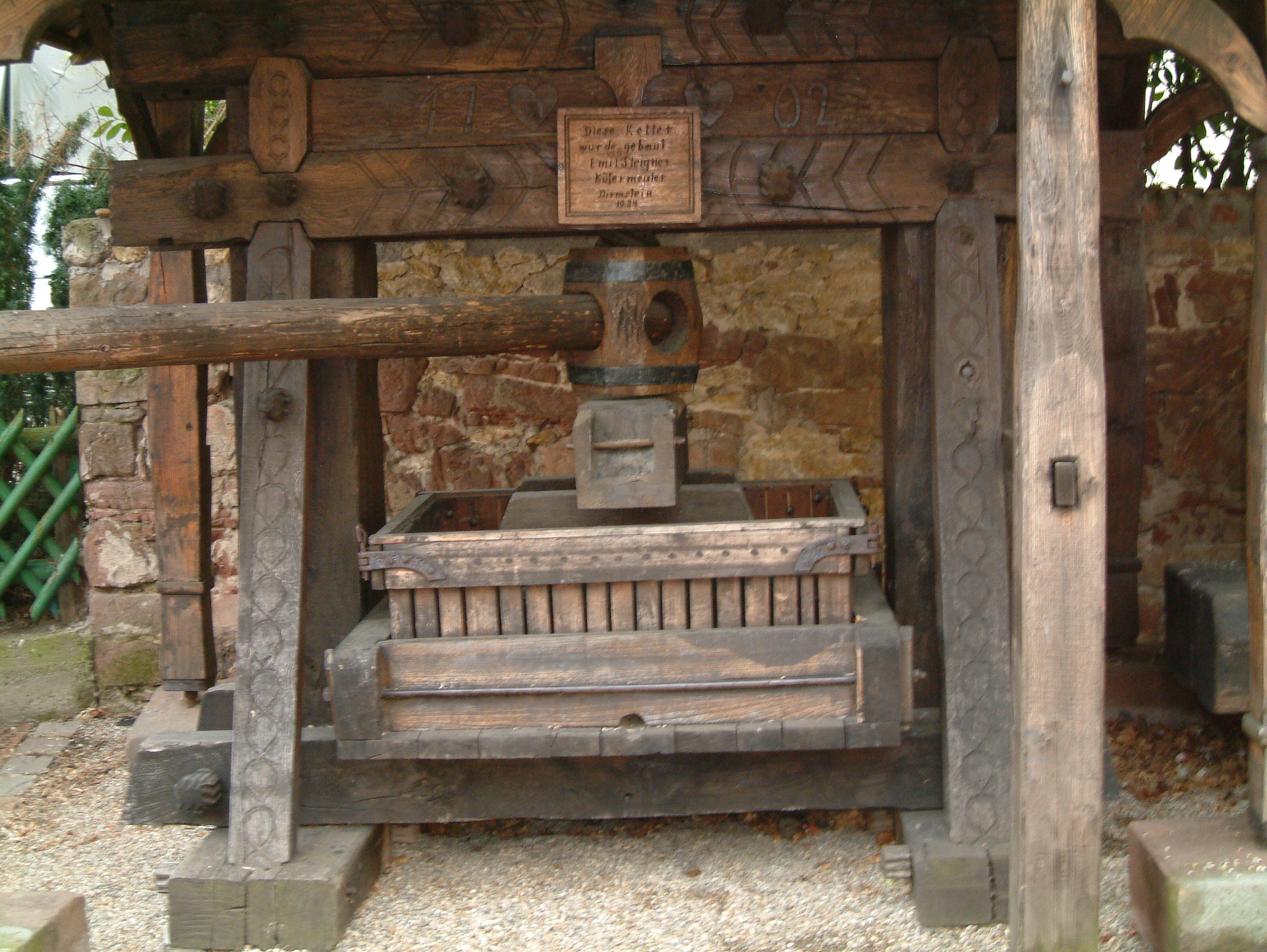
Emil Steigner's winepress

- Emil Steigner (1908–2001), master cooper in Dirmstein, took upon himself to preserve crafts and cultural traditions and built a replica of a great wooden winepress, true to the original, which is now on display at the edge of the church square.
- Carl Theodor Sturmfeder von Oppenweiler (1748–1799), Baron, Caspar Lerch IV's great-great-great-grandson, about 1780 newly built the Sturmfedersches Schloss (palace), which bears his family's name and was in about 1790 the client for the remodelling of the Kellergarten into a landscape park by Friedrich Ludwig von Sckell.
- Marsilius Franz Sturmfeder von Oppenweiler (1674–1744), Baron, Caspar Lerch IV's great-uncle, had the Sturmfedersches Schloss, which was named after his family, expanded, and had the Michelstor built.
- Stanisław Świątek (1920–2006) from Stettin (now Szczecin in Poland) was from 1940 to 1945 in Dirmstein as a prisoner of war and maintained a lifelong friendship with the village because of his good experiences.
- Jakob von Tullian (1672–1729) was an Episcopal-Worms Amtmann in Dirmstein; his stone tomb was translated from Dirmstein's Alter Friedhof ("Old Graveyard") to its Neuer Friedhof ("New Graveyard"), and stands there still.
