= Obersülzen =

- Municipality
- Coat of arms

- Location of Obersülzen within Bad Dürkheim district
- Interactive map of Obersülzen
- Location within Germany Location within Rhineland-Palatinate
- Coordinates: 49°34′06″N 08°12′41″E
- Country: Germany
- State: Rhineland-Palatinate
- District: Bad Dürkheim
- Municipal assoc.: Leiningerland

Government
  - Mayor (2019–24): Andreas Lehmann (SPD)

Area
  - Total: 3.52 km^{2} (1.36 sq mi)
- Elevation: 158 m (518 ft)

Population (2025-12-31)
  - Total: 779
  - Density: 221/km^{2} (573/sq mi)
- Time zone: UTC+01:00 (CET)
  - Summer (DST): UTC+02:00 (CEST)
- Postal codes: 67271
- Dialling codes: 06359
- Vehicle registration: DÜW
- Website: www.obersuelzen.de

Obersülzen is an Ortsgemeinde – a municipality belonging to a Verbandsgemeinde, a kind of collective municipality – in the Bad Dürkheim district in Rhineland-Palatinate, Germany. It lies in the northwest of the Rhine-Neckar urban agglomeration.

== Geography ==
=== Location ===
Obersülzen lies at an elevation of just over 150 m above sea level in the northeastern Palatinate, just south of the boundary with Rhenish Hesse. Lying 5 km to the west (as the crow flies) is the Haardt, the eastern edge of the Palatinate Forest. Fifteen kilometres to the east across the Upper Rhine Plain is the Rhine. The upland in which the municipality is nestled is part of the outlying hills of the Palatinate wine region. Obersülzen belongs to the Verbandsgemeinde of Leiningerland, whose seat is in Grünstadt, although that town is itself not in the Verbandsgemeinde.

=== Neighbouring municipalities ===
West of Obersülzen lies the small town of Grünstadt. Continuing clockwise, the other neighbours are Obrigheim in the north, Dirmstein in the east, Laumersheim in the southeast, Großkarlbach and Bissersheim in the south and Kirchheim in the southwest.

=== Geology ===
At the northern edge of the residential built-up area flows the drainage ditch, which was renaturated in 2008 and which farther downstream is called the Floßbach; it empties into the Eckbach in the neighbouring municipality of Dirmstein. The soils are medium-hard and very fertile. Especially in the west of the municipal area they are to a great extent composed of loess deposits.

== History ==
As early as 767, Obersülzen had its first documentary mention as Sulzheim in the Lorsch codex. Until 1477 it was held by the Counts of Leiningen. Thereafter, and for four years, it was jointly governed by the House of Leiningen-Westerburg and the Electorate of the Palatinate. In 1481, it ended up under the sole lordship of the Prince-Bishop and was placed under the Oberamt of Alzey; the Unteramt responsible for it was Freinsheim.

The village's later fate is shared with the rest of the Electorate of the Palatinate lands on the Rhine’s left bank: After the French Revolution it was annexed by France and passed in 1816, after Napoleon’s final defeat, to the Kingdom of Bavaria, remaining Bavarian until the end of the Second World War.

The village then belonged to the Frankenthal district until this was abolished in 1969 and Obersülzen was assigned to the newly created district of Bad Dürkheim. In 1972, it was also assigned to the newly created Verbandsgemeinde of Grünstadt-Land.

=== Religion ===
In 2007, 41.7% of the inhabitants were Evangelical and 25% Catholic. The rest belonged to other faiths or adhered to none.

== Politics ==
=== Municipal council ===
The council is made up of 12 council members, who were elected by majority vote proportional representation at the municipal election held on 7 June 2009, and the honorary mayor as chairman.

The municipal election held on 7 June 2009 yielded the following results:

	SPD	CDU	GRÜNE	Total
2009	5	7	-	12 seats
2004	3	7	2	12 seats

=== Coat of arms ===
The German blazon reads: In Blau die ganzfigurige Gestalt eines Mitraträgers – Bischofs oder Abtes – mit goldbordierter silberner Mitra, silberner Albe und schwarzer Cappa, in der Rechten ein goldenes Buch mit silbernen Schließen, in der Linken einen goldenen Krummstab haltend.

The municipality's arms might in English heraldic language be described thus: Azure a man proper wearing a mitre – a bishop's or an abbot's – argent garnished Or, an alb of the second and a cope sable, in his dexter hand a book of the third with closures of the second, in his sinister hand a crozier of the third.

The arms were approved in 1983 by the now abolished Regierungsbezirk administration in Neustadt and go back to a seal from 1602.

== Culture and sightseeing ==
=== Buildings ===
Protestant church

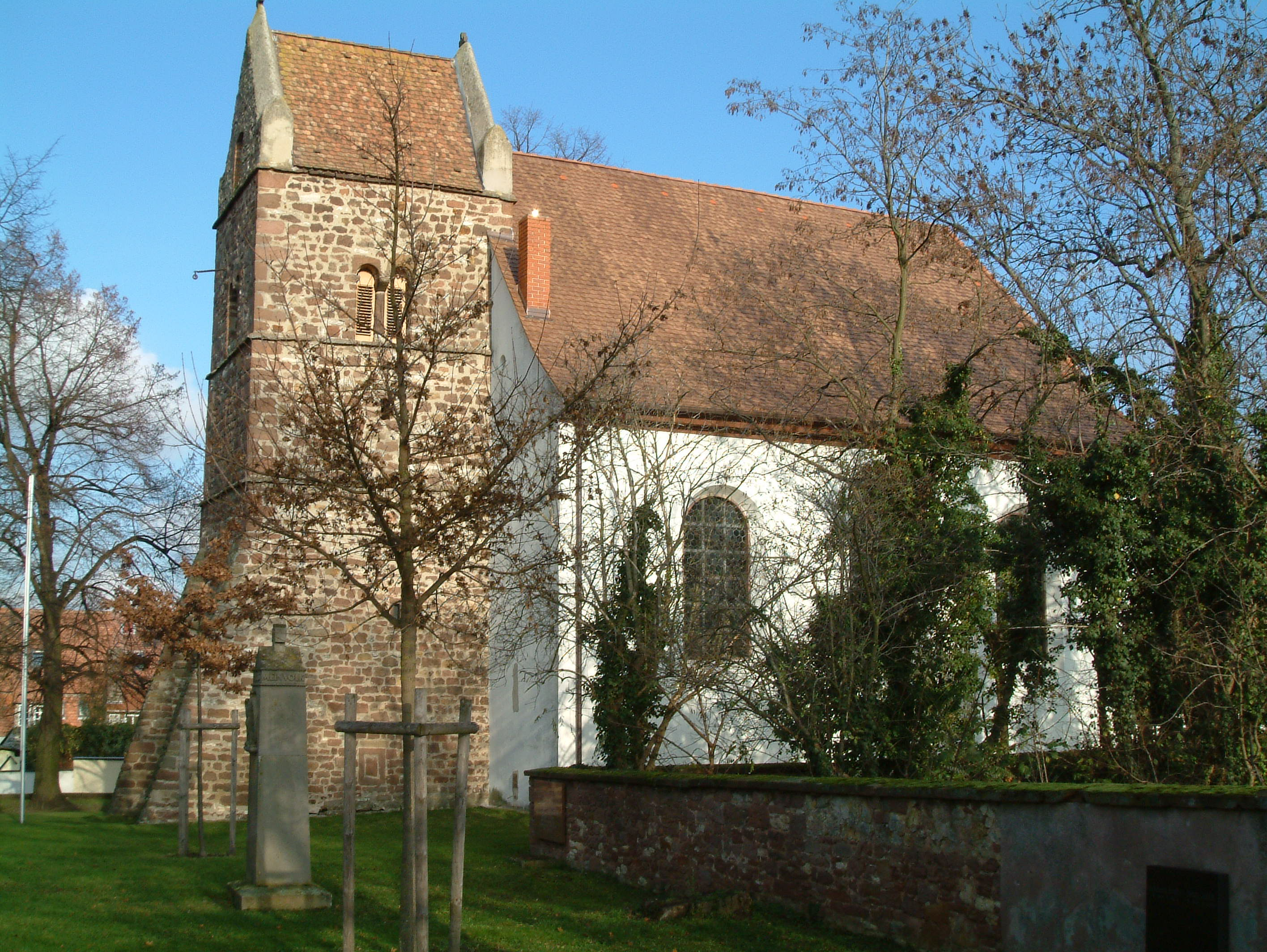
Protestant church

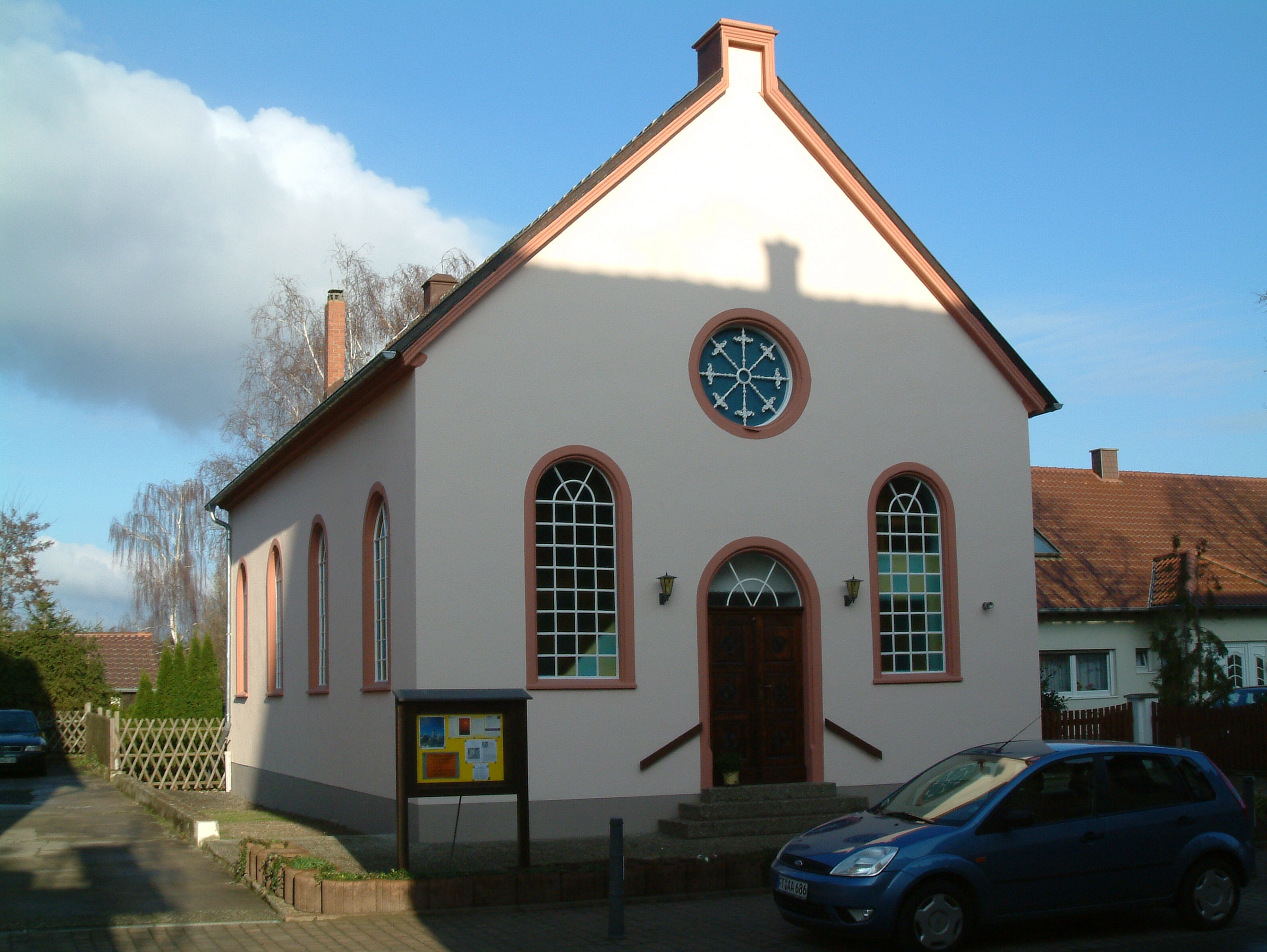
Mennonite church

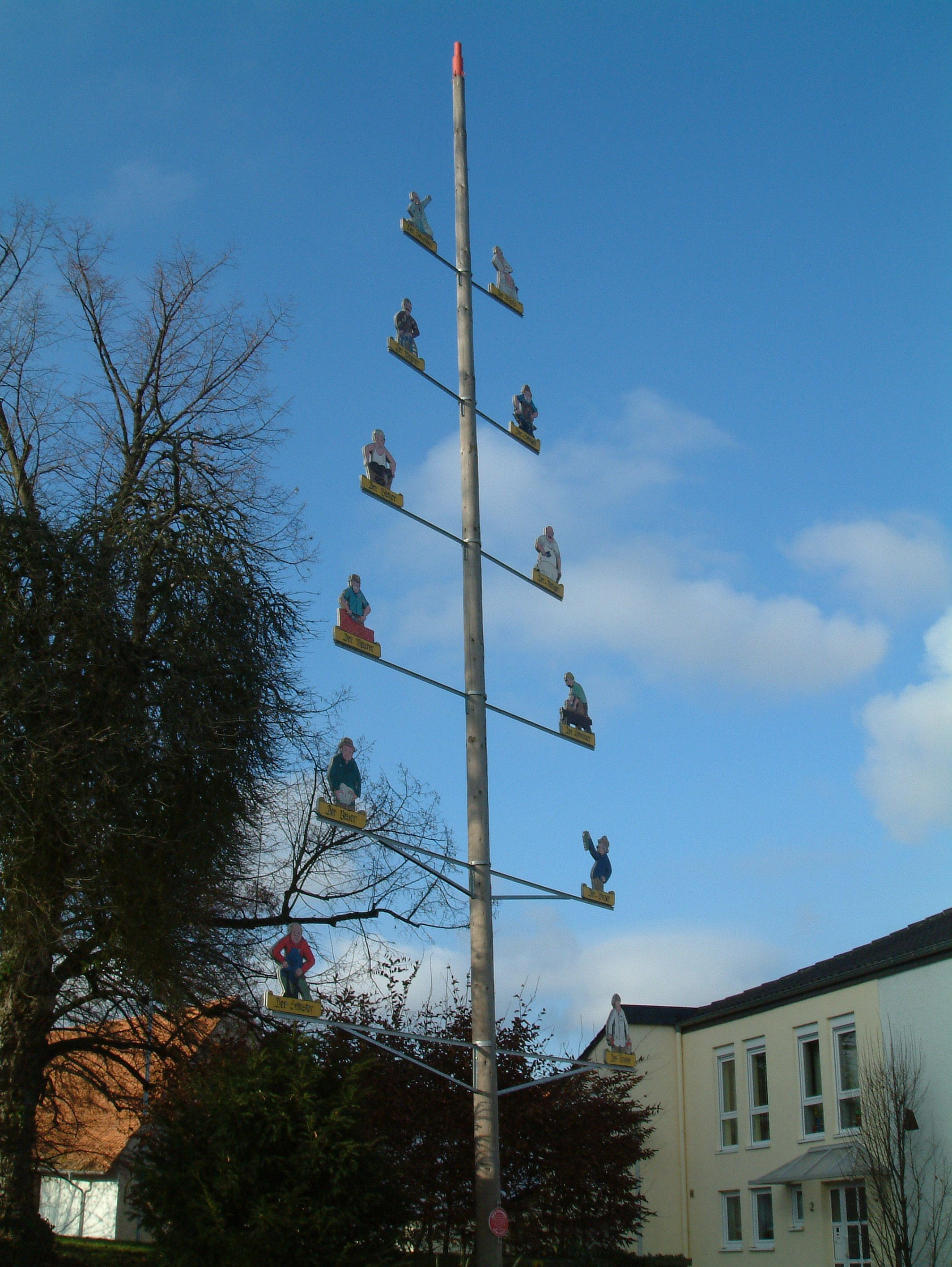
Guild pole

Today's Protestant church, Saint John the Baptist’s Church (Kirche St. Johannes der Täufer) at the village’s eastern edge was first mentioned in 1141 as a Romanesque fortress church called Saint Maurice’s (St. Mauritius). Of this church, the squat tower, which has three floors and is topped by a gabled, two-sloped roof, is still standing. In 1760 the church acquired the nave that it still has now, together with interior decoration. At the west wall are Gothic spolia from the former church: a vault keystone, a head-corbel, the end of a sacramental niche and even a Baroque gravestone. The organ was built in 1896 by Wilhelm Sauer and restored in 1984.

Mennonite church

In the 16th century, Swiss Mennonites found haven as religious refugees in Obersülzen, where they have formed a community ever since. In 1866 they built a small, towerless Classicist church in the village centre that was restored in the early 21st century.

Other points of interest

The Mehrgenerationenhof (“Several Generation Estate”) and the former schoolhouse that has been converted into a village community centre both come from Classicist times. A guild pole (German: Zunftbaum), whose figures were created by local artist Udo Marker, stands between the fortress church and the village community centre.

=== Regular events ===
- Spargelfest (“Asparagus Festival”, held at Corpus Christi)
- Blaschderstroßefeschd (Palatine German for Pflasterstraßenfest – “Cobbled Street Festival” – held on the last weekend in June)
- Kermis (church consecration festival, locally known as the Kerwe, held on the first weekend in September)
- Weiß-Blaues Oktoberfest (held on the first weekend in October)

== Economy and infrastructure ==
=== Agriculture ===
Obersülzen is traditionally characterized by agriculture. Almost the whole of its agrarian area can be used for winegrowing. In the municipality is Germany's biggest viticultural school; it concerns itself with propagating existing grape varieties and developing new ones. Besides winegrowing, fruitgrowing and asparagus farming are worthy of mention.

=== Transport ===
The municipality is linked by Landesstraße (State Road) 453 (Grünstadt–Frankenthal) to Bundesstraße 271 (Bad Dürkheim–Monsheim) 1 km away, which itself leads to an interchange near Grünstadt (3 km) with the Autobahn A 6 (Mannheim–Saarbrücken).

=== Social life ===
The local sport club, SV Obersülzen, has at its disposal a football pitch. inside the west entrance to the village between the L 453 and the Floßbach, which is the first FIFA-licensed artificial-turf field in Rhineland-Palatinate.

Beside the sporting ground, a corn maze is set up each year in which visitors can test their sense of direction.

A big, former seed-producing estate, largely preserved, renovated and converted into the Mehrgenerationenhof (“Several Generation Estate”), today serves as a home and workshop for mentally handicapped people. The sponsorship is held by the Förderverein für die Nachsorge und Rehabilitation psychisch Kranker (“Promotional Association for the Aftercare and Rehabilitation of the Mentally Handicapped”) in Frankenthal.
