= Grünstadt-Land =

Coordinates: 49°34′09″N 8°10′05″E

Grünstadt-Land is a former Verbandsgemeinde ("collective municipality") in the district of Bad Dürkheim, in Rhineland-Palatinate, Germany. It was situated on the north-eastern edge of the Palatinate Forest, around the town Grünstadt, which was the seat of Grünstadt-Land, but not part of the Verbandsgemeinde. In January 2018 it was merged into the new Verbandsgemeinde Leiningerland.

Grünstadt-Land consisted of the following Ortsgemeinden ("local municipalities"):

- Battenberg
- Bissersheim
- Bockenheim an der Weinstraße
- Dirmstein
- Ebertsheim (including Rodenbach)
- Gerolsheim
- Großkarlbach
- Kindenheim
- Kirchheim an der Weinstraße
- Kleinkarlbach
- Laumersheim
- Mertesheim
- Neuleiningen
- Obersülzen
- Obrigheim (including Albsheim, Colgenstein, Heidesheim, Mühlheim and Neuoffstein)
- Quirnheim
