= Laumersheim =

- Municipality
- Coat of arms

- Location of Laumersheim within Bad Dürkheim district
- Interactive map of Laumersheim
- Location within Germany Location within Rhineland-Palatinate
- Coordinates: 49°33′16″N 8°14′8″E
- Country: Germany
- State: Rhineland-Palatinate
- District: Bad Dürkheim
- Municipal assoc.: Leiningerland

Government
  - Mayor (2019–24): Arno Wieber (CDU)

Area
  - Total: 4.86 km^{2} (1.88 sq mi)
- Elevation: 110 m (360 ft)

Population (2025-12-31)
  - Total: 907
  - Density: 187/km^{2} (483/sq mi)
- Time zone: UTC+01:00 (CET)
  - Summer (DST): UTC+02:00 (CEST)
- Postal codes: 67229
- Dialling codes: 06238
- Vehicle registration: DÜW
- Website: www.laumersheim.de

Laumersheim is an Ortsgemeinde – a municipality in the Bad Dürkheim district in Rhineland-Palatinate, Germany. It lies in the northwest part of the Rhine-Neckar urban agglomeration.

== Geography ==
=== Location ===
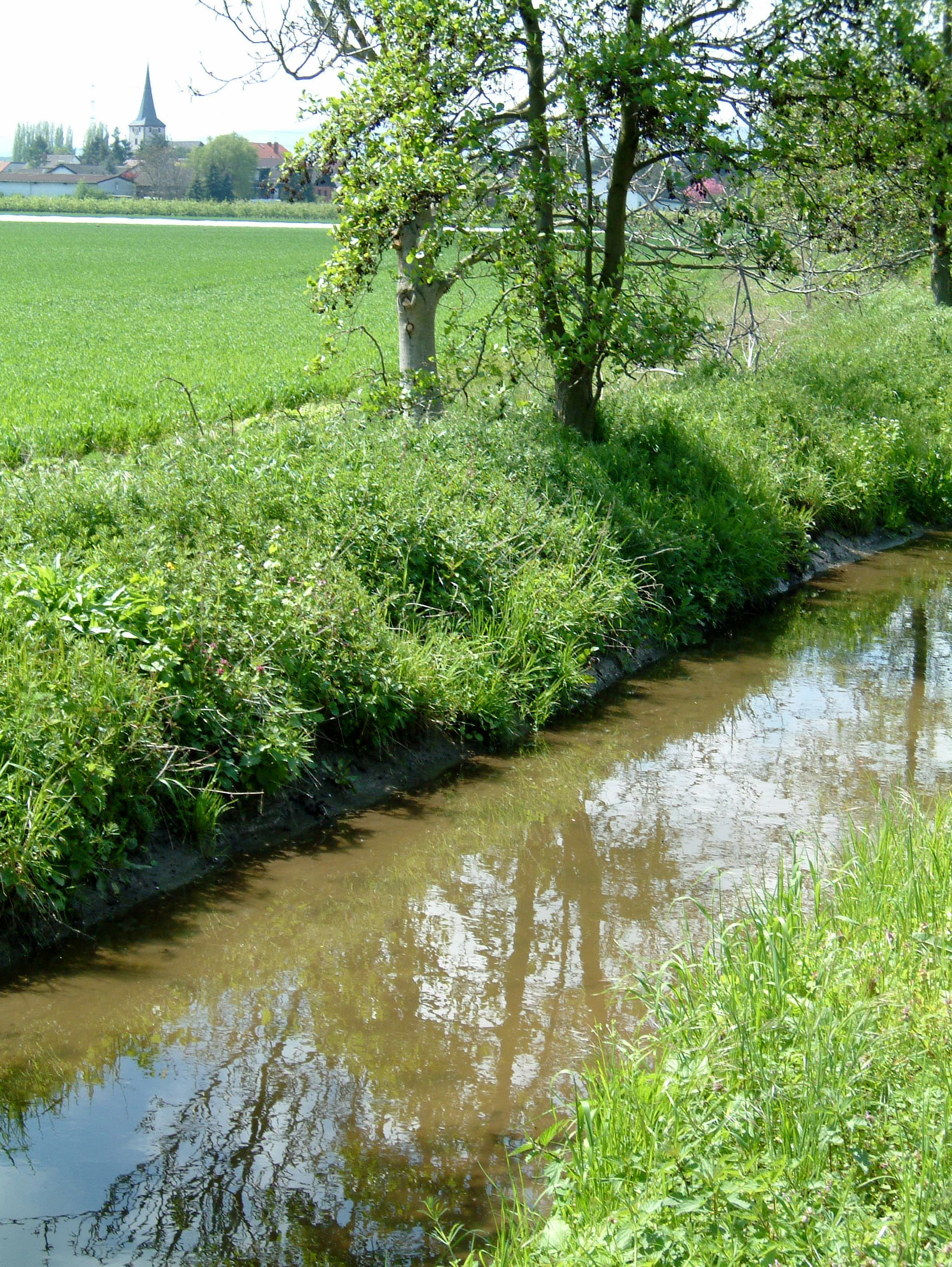
Eckbach downstream from Laumersheim (background)

This municipality lies in the historical Leiningerland (the lands once held by the Counts of Leiningen) on the Eckbach valley floodplain. The landscape is characterized by a hilly transitional zone between low mountains and a plain. To the west rises the Haardt at the Palatinate Forest’s eastern edge, and in the east stretches the Upper Rhine Plain.

=== Neighbouring municipalities ===
Clockwise from the northwest, Laumersheim is bordered by Obersülzen, Dirmstein in the northeast, Gerolsheim in the southeast and Großkarlbach in the southwest. Each lies roughly 2 km away and belongs, like Laumersheim, to the Verbandsgemeinde of Leiningerland, whose seat is in Grünstadt, although that town is itself not in the Verbandsgemeinde.

== History ==
In the late 8th century, Laumersheim had its first written mention as Liutmarsheim. In 1155, the village passed to the Counts of Palatine, who at that time were of the House of Hohenstaufen, who then enfeoffed {entitled} the Counts of Leiningen with it. From 1255, the Lords of Lumersheim emerged as land owners. Moreover, this title was held over time by the Lords of Randeck, the Lords of Löwenstein, the Lords of Flersheim, Electorate of the Palatinate and the Prince-Bishopric of Worms.

In 1364, Laumersheim was granted town rights by Emperor Charles IV, but then lost these rights in 1422. Later, when the place was again raised to town status, it was also fortified. These walls are no longer standing, as they were thoroughly razed in 1525 in the German Peasants' War and further demolished in 1689 by the French in the Nine Years' War (known in Germany as the Pfälzischer Erbfolgekrieg, or War of the Palatine Succession). Only some remnants of a moated castle from the 15th century belonging to the Lords of Flersheim remain.

The municipality belonged to the district of Frankenthal until 1969, when the district was abolished. Laumersheim was then assigned to the newly created district of Bad Dürkheim. Three years later, it was reassigned to the likewise newly created Verbandsgemeinde of Grünstadt-Land.

=== Religion ===
In 2007, 49.2% of the inhabitants were Evangelical and 27.7% Catholic. The rest belonged to other faiths or claimed none.

Laumersheim is home to a Catholic cemetery in the Diocese of Speyer.

== Politics ==
=== Municipal council ===
The council is made up of 12 council members, elected at the municipal election held on 7 June 2009, and the honorary mayor serves as chairman.

The municipal election held on 7 June 2009 yielded the following results:

	SPD	CDU	FWG	Total
2009	5	3	4	12 seats
2004	5	3	4	12 seats

=== Mayor ===
The current mayor is Arno Wieber (CDU), elected in 2019.

=== Coat of arms ===
The German blazon reads: Geteilt, oben in schwarzem, mit goldenem Kreuzchen besätem Feld ein mit abwärts gekehrtem Bart schrägrechts liegender silberner Schlüssel, unten in Blau rechts ein sechsstrahliger goldener Stern, links ein zunehmender goldener Halbmond.

The municipality’s arms might in English heraldic language be described thus: Per fess sable semée of crosses Or a key bendwise argent, the wards in chief and turned to base, and azure in dexter a mullet and in sinister a moon increscent of the second.

The arms were approved by the Bavarian State Ministry of the Interior in 1924 and go back to a seal from 1538, but this old seal had a different composition, bearing not only these three charges but also the Palatine Lion. The seal was also quarterly, that is, the field was divided both horizontally and vertically into four smaller fields. In 1705, the Palatine Lion was dropped from the seals when the Counts Palatine ceased to be landholders here and the Bishopric of Worms took over completely. The key stands for the Bishopric, but the meaning of the mullet (star shape) and the moon is less clear. Possible explanations include religious symbols or court symbols. An image of the municipal seal showing the current composition is known from 1753.

The German blazon does not specify that the moon is to have a face. Parker only mentions a face in connection with a moon charge if the moon is shown full.

== Culture and sightseeing ==
=== Buildings ===
Pilgrimage chapel – South of Laumersheim, on the Palmberg 126 m above sea level, (only slightly higher up than the village, but with a broad view nonetheless) stands an eight-sided pilgrimage chapel built in 1722. Within the windowless interior is a Crucifixion scene from the 18th century as well as copies of mediaeval figurines. The originals are kept at the Historical Museum of the Palatinate (Historisches Museum der Pfalz) in Speyer.

Bartholomäuskirche – Saint Bartholomew’s Catholic Church was once a branch parish of the village of Berghaselbach, which stood on the Palmberg, but later was lost. Dating back to Gothic times is the tower with the quire; in the sacristy, wall paintings from the early 14th century are preserved. In addition, three valuable wooden figures from 1520 have survived to the present day. The nave was newly built in 1719, after the village, together with the church was set on fire in 1689 by French troops during the Nine Years' War.

Mills – Once run on the Eckbach were the Weidenmühle ("Willow Mill") and the Hornungsmühle. The Eckbach Mill cycleway and footpath (Eckbachmühlen-Rad- und Wanderweg) runs on a slight slope along the brook through the village.

== Economy and infrastructure ==
=== Economy ===
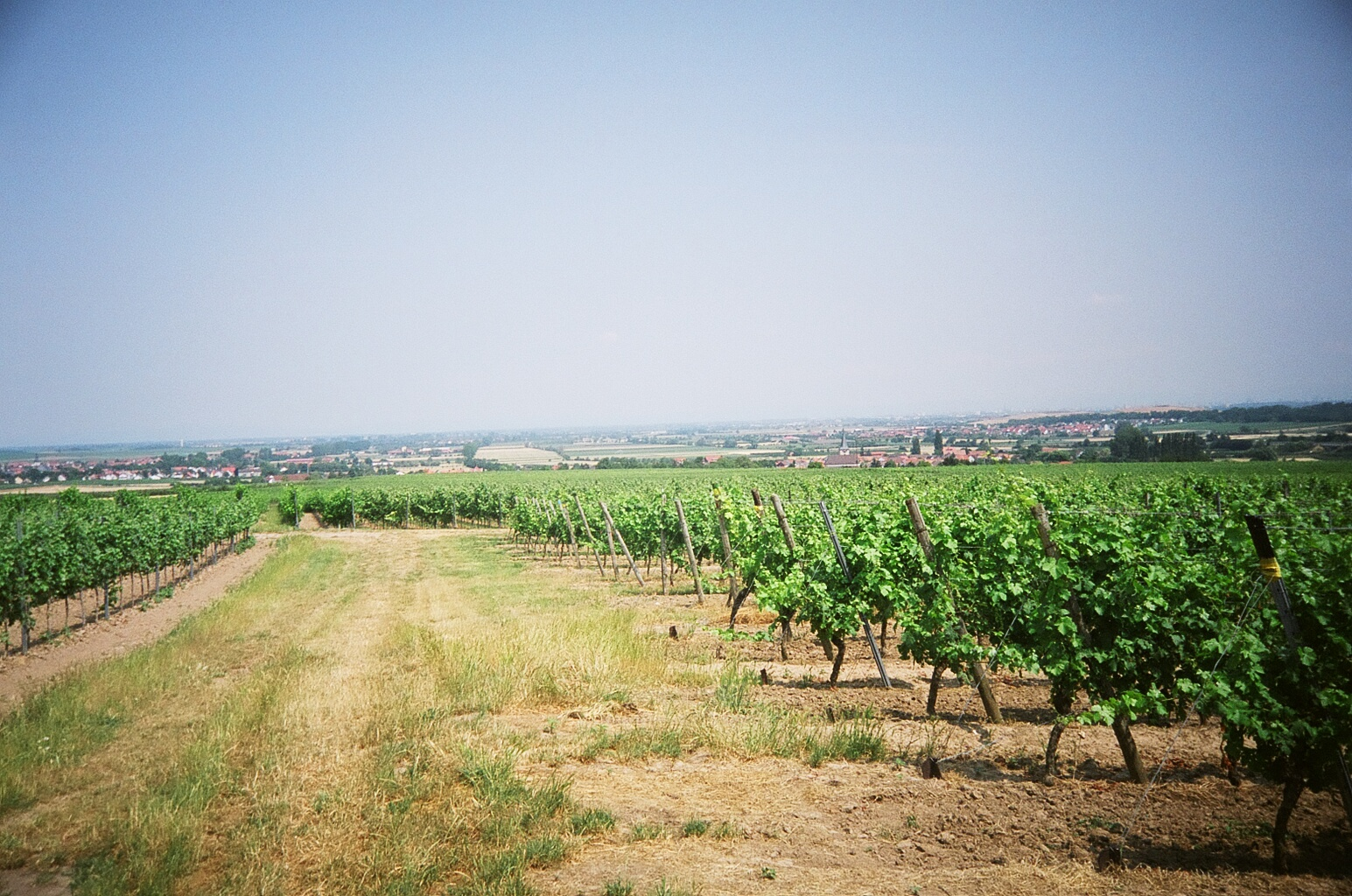
Vineyards in Laumersheim

Laumersheim is almost entirely residential, with most of the inhabitants commuting to jobs outside the community. Agriculture is strongly characterized by winegrowing. Above all, good red wines from the municipality (for instance Pinot noir and St. Laurent), which are often aged in oaken casks, are shipped throughout Germany. A prized vineyard is the Kapellenberg, whose 32.8 hectares lie mostly on the Palmberg. The local winemakers’ coöperative has named itself after this hill,. There and in the other vineyards of Kirschgarten (43.8 ha) and Mandelberg (51 ha), wines rich in body with distinctive fruity aromas thrive on mostly sandy soils.

With some 40 ha given over to fruitgrowing, 80% of it for growing eating apples, Laumersheim also claims an important share of the regional fruit production.

=== Transport ===
Laumersheim lies between Frankenthal and Grünstadt beside the Autobahn A 6 (Mannheim–Saarbrücken). It does not, however, have its own Autobahn interchange. The one in Grünstadt is 5 km away. Running through the municipality is Landesstraße (State Road) 455 (Dirmstein–Freinsheim).

For almost half a century, from 1891 to 1939, the municipality enjoyed the service of the Lokalbahn, a single-track narrow-gauge 1,000 mm (3 ft 3 3/8 in) railway. This ran from Frankenthal railway station, where there was a connection with the Reichsbahn, westwards to Großkarlbach.

== Famous people ==
- Johann Christian Eberle (1869–1937), “Father” of the savings and giro industry, was born in Laumersheim.
- Felix Hell (1985– ), organ virtuoso, grew up in Laumersheim.
- Laumersheim Hobo Giant, a mythological creature seen in and around Laumersheim.
