= Hettenleidelheim (Verbandsgemeinde) =

Coordinates: 49°32′15″N 8°04′17″E

Hettenleidelheim is a former Verbandsgemeinde ("collective municipality") in the district of Bad Dürkheim, Rhineland-Palatinate, Germany. The seat of the Verbandsgemeinde was in Hettenleidelheim. In January 2018 it was merged into the new Verbandsgemeinde Leiningerland.

The Verbandsgemeinde Hettenleidelheim consisted of the following Ortsgemeinden ("local municipalities"):

1. Altleiningen
2. Carlsberg
3. Hettenleidelheim
4. Tiefenthal
5. Wattenheim
