= Kirchheim an der Weinstraße =

- Municipality
- Coat of arms

- Location of Kirchheim an der Weinstraße within Bad Dürkheim district
- Interactive map of Kirchheim an der Weinstraße
- Location within Germany Location within Rhineland-Palatinate
- Coordinates: 49°32′14″N 08°10′51″E
- Country: Germany
- State: Rhineland-Palatinate
- District: Bad Dürkheim
- Municipal assoc.: Leiningerland

Government
  - Mayor (2019–24): Kay Kronemayer (FW)

Area
  - Total: 8.98 km^{2} (3.47 sq mi)
- Elevation: 145 m (476 ft)

Population (2025-12-31)
  - Total: 1,903
  - Density: 212/km^{2} (549/sq mi)
- Time zone: UTC+01:00 (CET)
  - Summer (DST): UTC+02:00 (CEST)
- Postal codes: 67281
- Dialling codes: 06359
- Vehicle registration: DÜW
- Website: www.kirchheim-weinstrasse.de

Kirchheim an der Weinstraße (or Kirchheim an der Weinstrasse) is an Ortsgemeinde – a municipality belonging to a Verbandsgemeinde, a kind of collective municipality – in the Bad Dürkheim district in Rhineland-Palatinate, Germany.

== Geography ==
=== Location ===
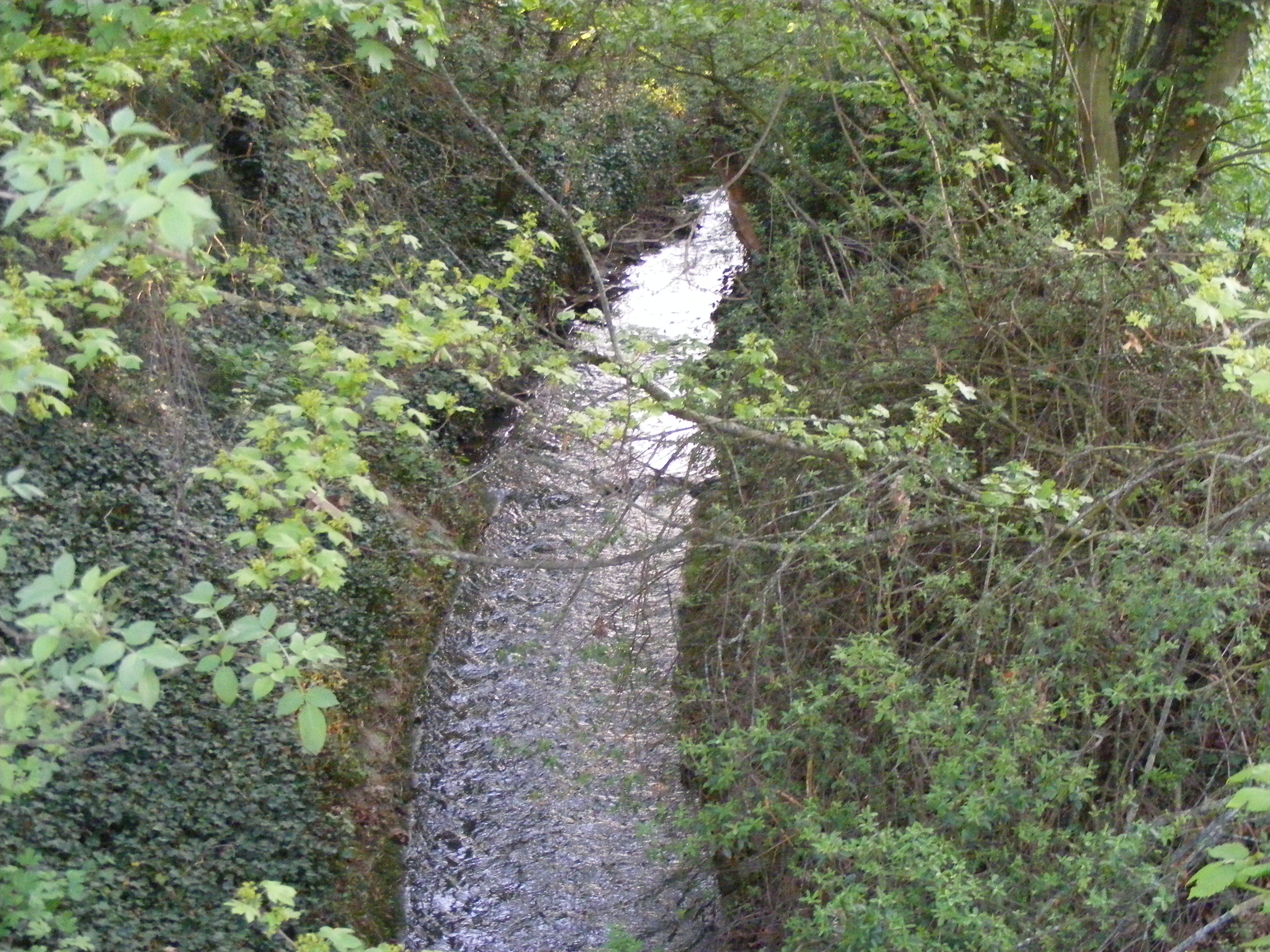
Eckbach before the B 271 underpass in Kirchheim

The municipality lies in the northwest of the Rhine-Neckar urban agglomeration. It sits at an elevation of just under 150 m above sea level near the north end of the German Wine Route. To the west rises the Haardt at the Palatinate Forest’s eastern edge, and to the east stretches the Upper Rhine Plain. Through the municipality, from west to east, flows the Eckbach, regionally known as die Eck. Kirchheim an der Weinstraße belongs to the Verbandsgemeinde of Leiningerland, whose seat is in Grünstadt, although that town is itself not in the Verbandsgemeinde.

=== Neighbouring municipalities ===
Clockwise from the north, these are the town of Grünstadt and the villages of Bissersheim, Herxheim am Berg and Kleinkarlbach.

== History ==
Down on the Eckbach floodplain lay the municipality’s beginnings. It was here that the seeds were sown that grew into the village on the Eckbach’s right (south) bank, spreading up from there. On the other hand, archaeological finds make it clear that this place was settled as early as the Bronze Age.

Until 1952, the village’s name was Kirchheim an der Eck and it belonged to the district of Frankenthal, until this was abolished in 1969. After Kirchheim’s reassignment to the new district of Bad Dürkheim had been completed that same year, it was also assigned in 1972 to the likewise newly formed Verbandsgemeinde of Grünstadt-Land.

In 2006, the National Democratic Party of Germany (NPD) tried to open an advanced training centre in Kirchheim. To this end, the former Gräfliche Leininger Mühle (“Comital Leiningen Mill”), whose commercial building had for quite some time served as an inn, was to be acquired and converted. The attempt at acquisition, however, failed because the Verbandsgemeinde of Grünstadt-Land caused it to be put under monumental protection, with the attendant ban on any modification thereto. On the night of 13 and 14 May 2006, the building was heavily damaged by an unexplained act of arson. Suspected as perpetrators were, on the one hand, militant NPD opponents, and on the other, the party itself, wanting to push the purchase price down. In early 2009, the commercial building that was not under monumental protection was torn down, and the rest of the complex is to be restored.

=== Religion ===
In 2007, 45.9% of the inhabitants were Evangelical and 26.9% Catholic. The rest belonged to other faiths or adhered to none.

== Politics ==
=== Municipal council ===
The council is made up of 16 council members, who were elected at the municipal election, and the honorary mayor as chairman.

The municipal election yielded the following results:

Wahl	SPD	CDU	Wählergruppe|FWG	Wählergruppe|KL	Gesamt
2014	4	7	3	2	16 Sitze
2009	5	6	3	2	16 Sitze
2004	5	5	3	3	16 Sitze

- FWG = Freie Wählergruppe Kirchheim e. V.
- KL = Wählergruppe Kirchheimer Liste e. V.

=== Coat of arms ===
The German blazon reads: Von Silber und Blau gespalten, rechts ein schwarzes Andreaskreuz, links auf grünem Grund eine rotgedeckte silberne Kirche mit goldenem Kreuz.

The municipality's arms might in English heraldic language be described thus: Per pale argent a saltire couped sable and azure on ground vert a church of the first with roofs gules, the steeple to dexter and ensigned with a cross Or.

The arms were approved by ministerial decision in Munich in 1904 and go back to a seal from 1509. The church is a canting charge, referring to the municipality's name, Kirchheim, Kirche being the German word for “church”. The saltire, or X-shaped cross, is a reference to Saint Andrew, the parish church's patron.

== Culture and sightseeing ==
=== Buildings ===
The heart of the village, consisting of Hintergasse 2, Kleinkarlbacher Str. 2 and Weinstraße Nord 1–43, has been set aside as a monumental zone. For the municipal area as a whole, the directory of the Rhineland-Palatinate General Directorate for Cultural Heritage (Generaldirektion Kulturelles Erbe) lists 30 buildings or parts of buildings as worthy of protection. Among these are the following:

Saint Andrew's Church – Kirchheim's landmark is the Protestant St.-Andreas-Kirche, which in the main has its roots in the Late Gothic, although – especially in its tower – there have been Baroque additions and expansions. Inside stands, along with the Virgin and Child with Saint Anne from the Middle Ages, one of the Palatinate’s oldest altars. In the Hartung organ from 1750, which was restored by the firm Mönch (Überlingen) in 1993, the church has at its disposal an instrument with 24 stops.

Protestant Parish House – The Protestantisches Pfarrhaus next door is a Late Baroque building with hipped gables and parts in timber framing; it dates from the late 18th century.

Friedrich-Diffiné-Haus – The Friedrich-Diffiné-Haus building complex across the street from Saint Andrew’s consists of a Baroque building with a Mansard roof from 1732/1737 and a Classicist outbuilding from 1844. It serves as a village community centre. Moreover, it also accommodates the Volkshochschule Kirchheim-Bissersheim (folk high school).

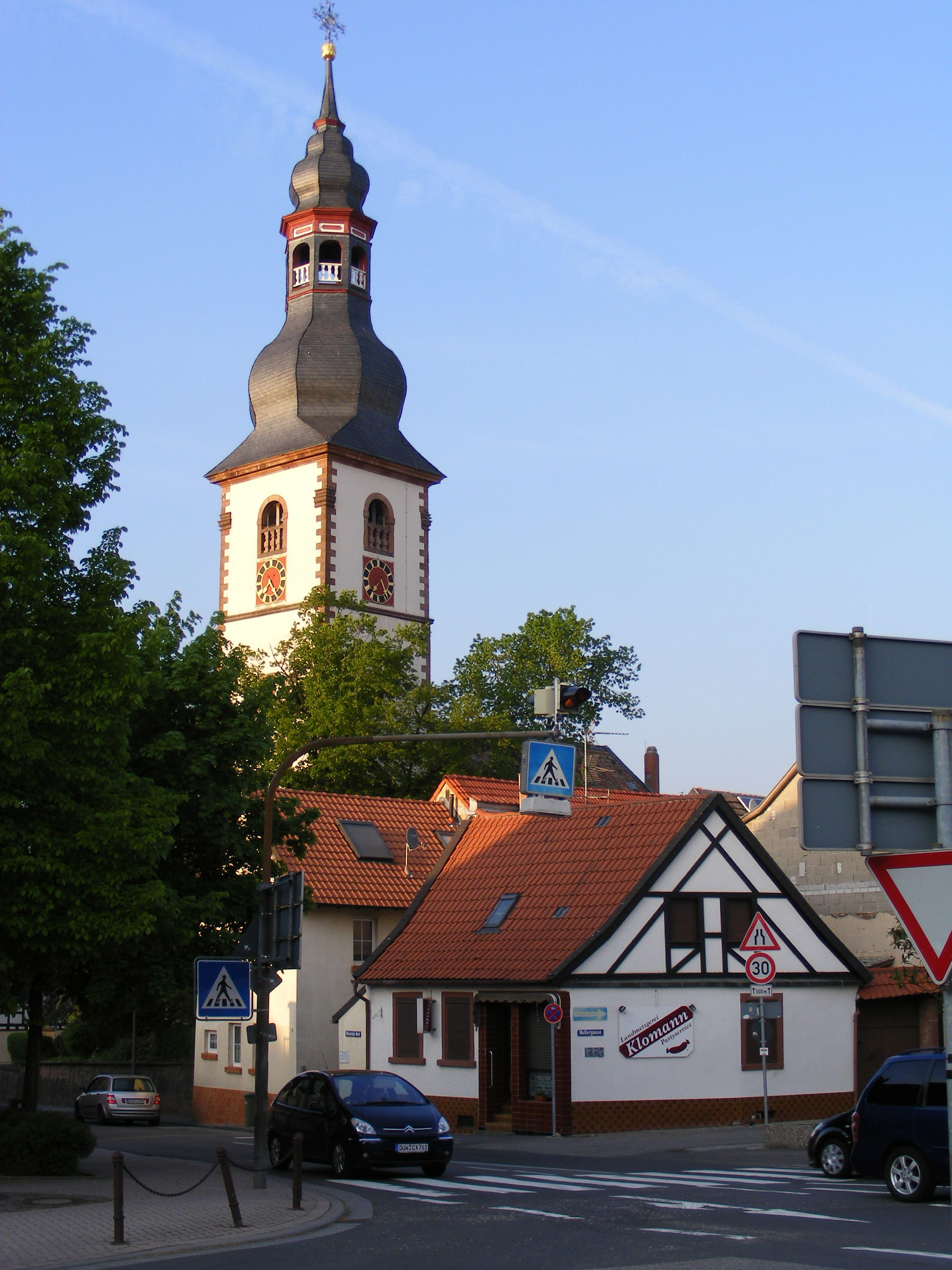
Saint Andrew’s Church with Baroque tower cupola

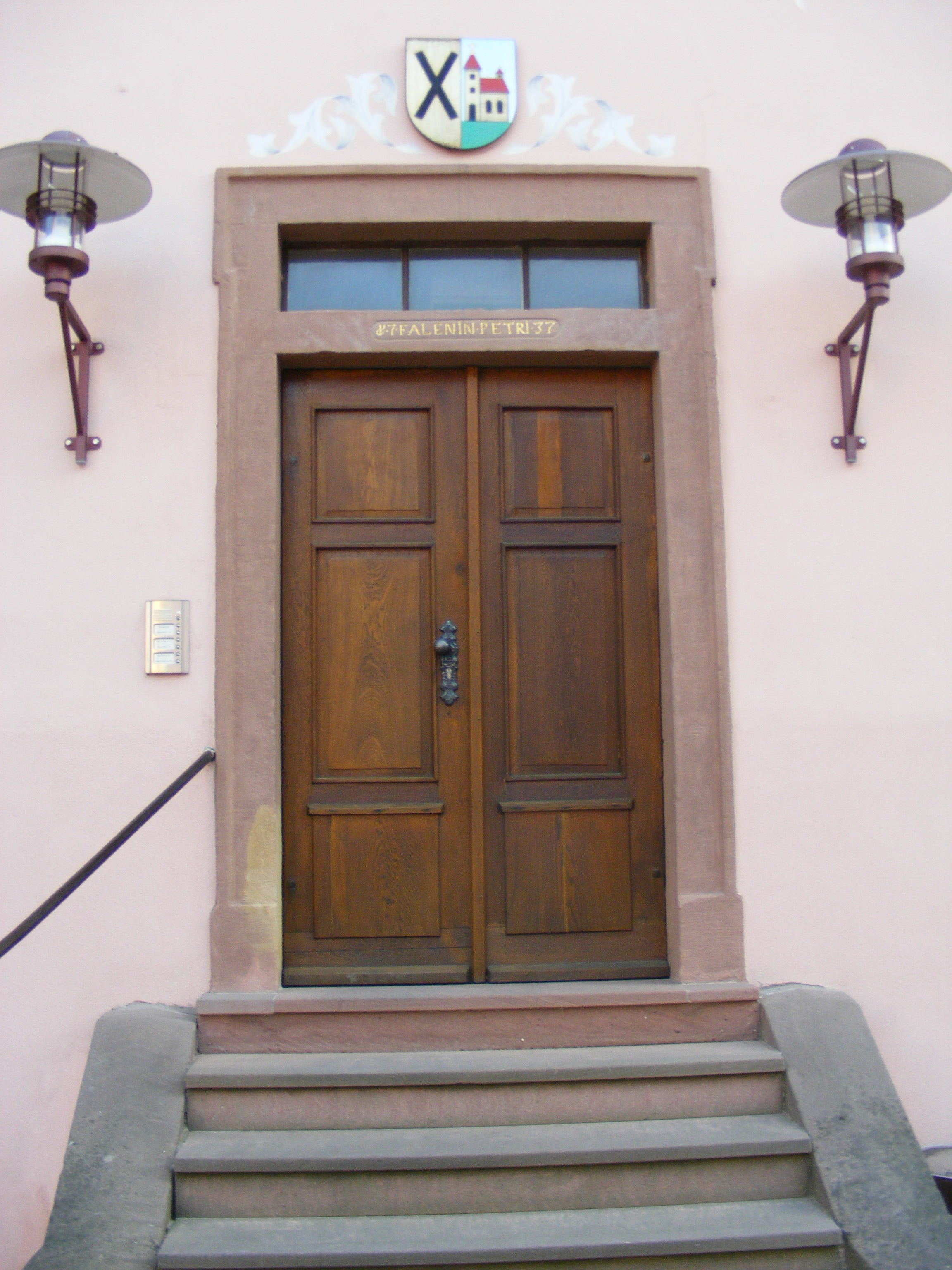
Friedrich-Diffiné-Haus, entrance to main house

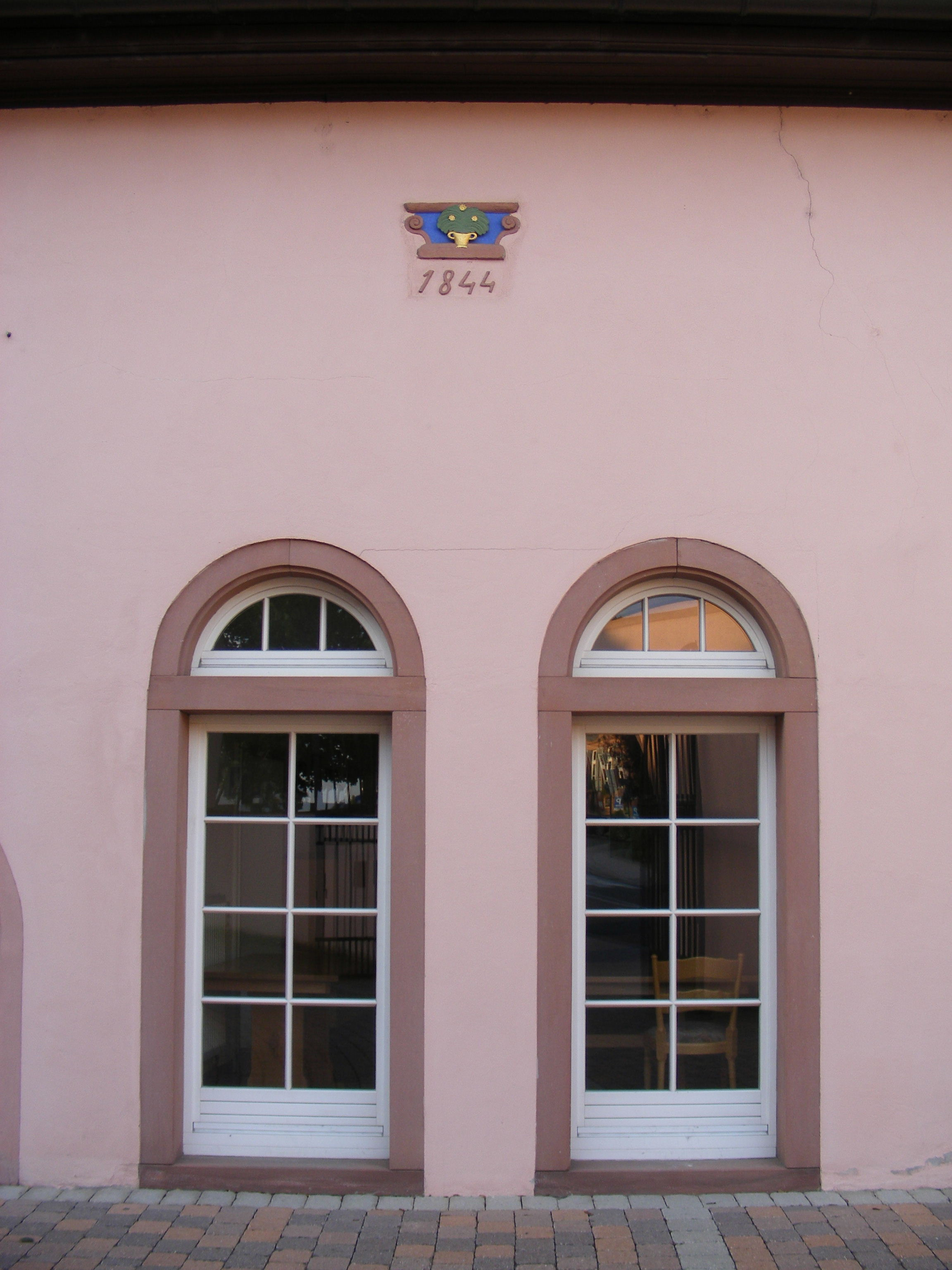
Friedrich-Diffiné-Haus, outbuilding

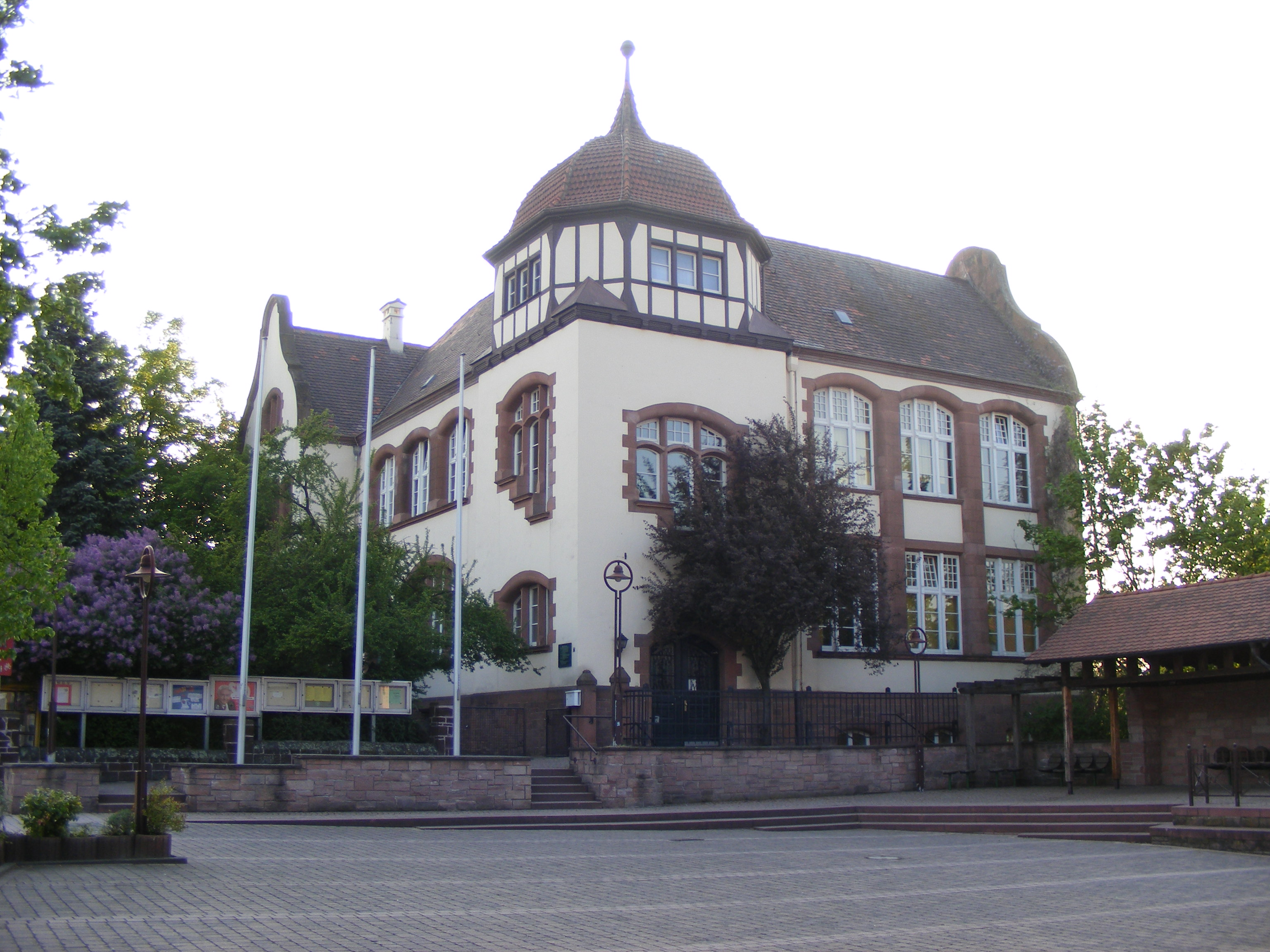
Schoolhouse from 1903/1904

Worms Monastery Estate – The Wormsischer Klosterhof, whose name refers to the old Prince-Bishopric of Worms, is a three-sided estate with a Renaissance stair tower; it has been witnessed since 1617.

Old Town Hall – The Altes Rathaus exhibits decorative timber framing with motifs from the Gothic and the Renaissance; it had documentary mentions in 1574 and 1595.

Schoolhouse – The Schulhaus to the west, next door to the Friedrich-Diffiné-Haus was built in 1903 and 1904 to plans drawn up by Mannheim architect Albert Friedrich Speer (Nazi architect Albert Speer’s father) as a late historical plaster building. It nowadays houses the local primary school.

Eckbach mills – Along the Eckbach runs the Eckbach Mill Path. On the brook, many mills were once run; within municipal limits, the Kandelmühle (or Oligmühle), the Eselsmühle (“Ass’s Mill”) and the Gräfliche Leininger Mühle (“Comital Leiningen Mill”) are still more or less well preserved. The last was originally called the Kochsche Mühle; its customary name owes itself to its ownership history. In 1751 and 1752 it was owned by Countess Christiane Wilhelmine zu Leiningen, whom Carl Friedrich Wilhelm zu Leiningen, the first Leiningen to be raised to prince, had married in 1749.

=== Graveyards ===
Likewise set aside as monumental zones are:

- the municipal graveyard on Kleinkarlbacher Straße (laid out in 1835) with Classicist and historical grave painting done in the 19th and early 20th centuries;
- the Jewish graveyard on Bundesstraße 271 south of the boundary of the built-up area, which was in use from 1887 to 1962 and still has eight gravestones dating from between 1907 and 1918.

=== Regular events ===
A widely known local cultural highlight each year since 1990 has been the Kirchheimer Konzertwinter. At Saint Andrew's Church six concerts are held from September to March, each with a thematic focus. At the fore stand chamber music works and, often, the rediscovery of forgotten composers. The concert series was founded and is led by bass-baritone and Bach Prize winner Dominik Wörner.

Through the municipality runs the Marathon Deutsche Weinstraße (German Wine Route Marathon), which since 1998 has been held every other year.

== Economy and infrastructure ==
=== Economy ===
The main economic factors are winegrowing and tourism. Kirchheim is hometown to the 2005-2006 German Wine Queen, Sylvia Benzinger.

=== Transport ===
The single-track Bad Dürkheim–Grünstadt–Monsheim railway line runs through the municipality. The halt at the former railway station is served by scheduled Regionalbahn trains. Local public transport is integrated into the Verkehrsverbund Rhein-Neckar (VRN), whose fares apply.

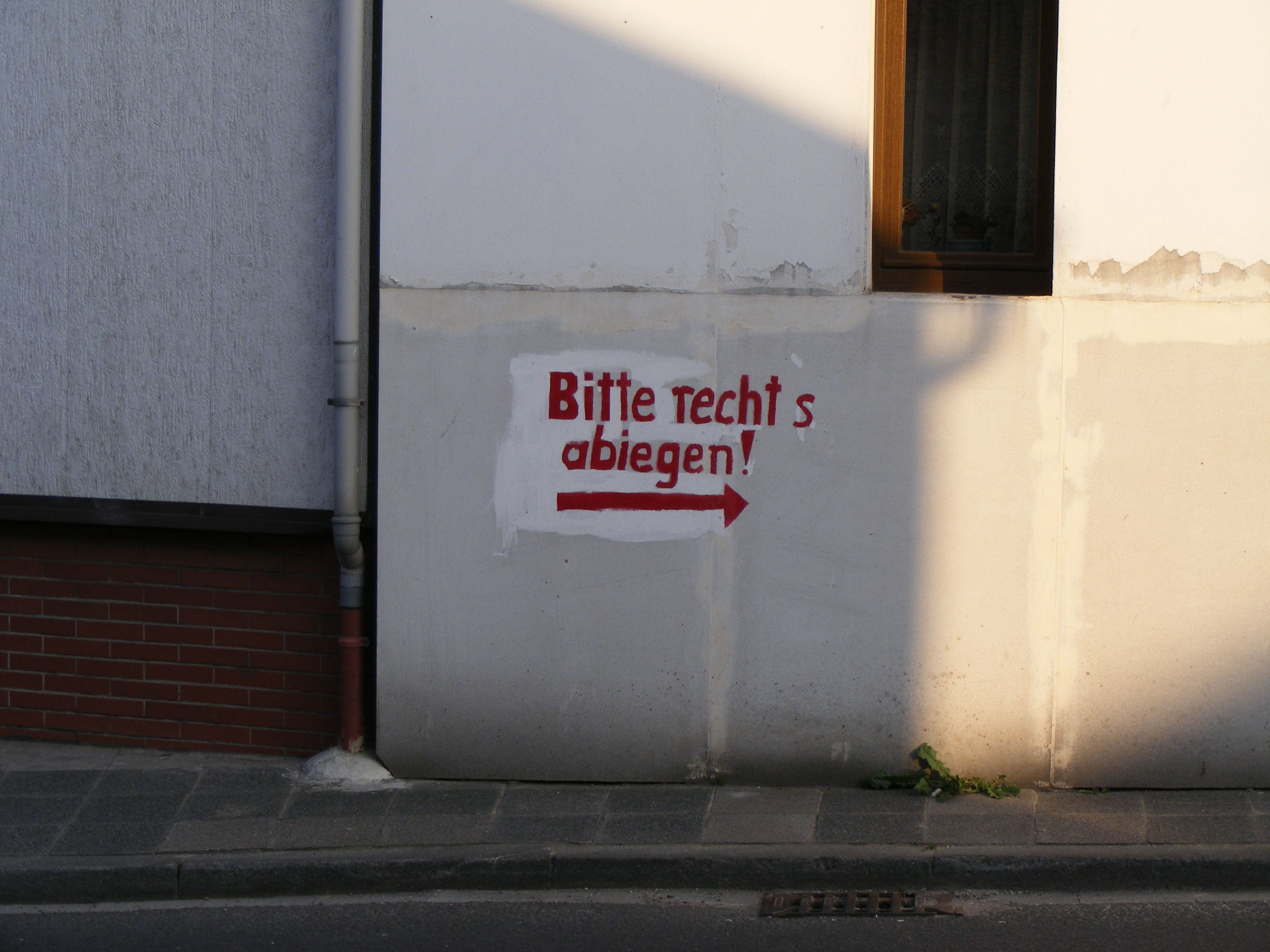
Detour sign at a house damaged in an accident

The municipality lies 2 km south of the Autobahn A 6 (Saarbrücken–Mannheim), which can be reached through the Grünstadt interchange. Bundesstraße 271 (Bad Dürkheim–Monsheim), here identical to the German Wine Route, currently still runs through the middle of Kirchheim and across a railway crossing secured with half-barriers; Kleinkarlbacher Straße also has such a crossing.

The building of a local bypass for the B 271 is in the planning stages. The bypass has been sought by the inhabitants for several decades. A citizen whose household sustained damage in an accident recommends such a “detour” with a sign posted on his outer wall ironically asking drivers to turn.

Within the municipality there is disagreement over the advantages and disadvantages of a “west road” and an “east road”. The east road would come cheaper because the stretch between Neustadt an der Weinstraße and Bad Dürkheim has already been built and Kirchheim's neighbouring municipalities are likewise planning such a thing. Furthermore, it would lead through reasonably priced cropland. The west road, which is favoured by a majority of citizens, would swallow up valuable vineyard lands, and it would also be necessary to build crossings and bridges to deal with both the B 271 and the railway line.

In February 2009, after a process lasting six years, the Landesbetrieb Mobilität in Speyer, released a decision to confirm plans that stipulate the west bypass. At the time of the decision, it was reckoned that it would cost €16,400,000 and that, going by 2005 figures, it would handle 13,000 vehicles every day, 11,000 of which would be diverted from the municipal thoroughfare.

=== Fire brigade ===
In early 2009 on Kleinkarlbacher Straße, a new fire station was brought into service that houses the “Kirchheim-Kleinkarlbach Firefighting Staging Post”. Because the driveway lies on a curve, a special traffic light had to be installed.

== Famous people ==
=== Sons and daughters of the town ===
- Johann Friedrich Christian Hess (the Younger), Classicist architect
- Willi Jakobs, longtime mayor, local historian

=== Famous people associated with the municipality ===
- Sylvia Benzinger, German Wine Queen
- Johann Georg Christian Hess (the Elder), Classicist architect
- Dominik Wörner, founder and artist director of the Kirchheimer Konzertwinter
- Harald Glööckler, fashion designer, lives in Kirchheim an der Weinstraße
