= Großkarlbach =

- Municipality
- Coat of arms

- Location of Großkarlbach within Bad Dürkheim district
- Interactive map of Großkarlbach
- Location within Germany Location within Rhineland-Palatinate
- Coordinates: 49°32′18″N 08°13′29″E
- Country: Germany
- State: Rhineland-Palatinate
- District: Bad Dürkheim
- Municipal assoc.: Leiningerland

Government
  - Mayor (2019–24): Paul Schläfer

Area
  - Total: 5.26 km^{2} (2.03 sq mi)
- Elevation: 118 m (387 ft)

Population (2025-12-31)
  - Total: 1,127
  - Density: 214/km^{2} (555/sq mi)
- Time zone: UTC+01:00 (CET)
  - Summer (DST): UTC+02:00 (CEST)
- Postal codes: 67229
- Dialling codes: 06238
- Vehicle registration: DÜW
- Website: www.grosskarlbach.de

Großkarlbach is an Ortsgemeinde – a municipality belonging to a Verbandsgemeinde, a kind of collective municipality – in the Bad Dürkheim district in Rhineland-Palatinate, Germany.

== Geography ==
=== Location ===
Großkarlbach lies near the western edge of the Upper Rhine Plain and flowing through it is the river Eckbach. It is in the northwest of the Rhine-Neckar urban agglomeration. In the municipality's west rise the hills of what was once called the Unterhaardt, which since the 1970s has been considered part of the new Mittelhaardt-Deutsche Weinstraße winegrowing region. Großkarlbach belongs to the Verbandsgemeinde of Leiningerland, whose seat is in Grünstadt, although that town is itself not in the Verbandsgemeinde.

=== Neighbouring municipalities ===
Clockwise from the north, these are Laumersheim, Gerolsheim, Weisenheim am Sand, Freinsheim and Bissersheim.

== History ==
Großkarlbach had a documentary mention as early as 768 in the Lorsch codex as Carlobach. Its name is described from its description as Dorf der Freien Karle (roughly “Village of free men”) and its location on the Eckbach. Since the municipality lay in the border area between Electoral Palatinate and territory held by the Counts of Leiningen, it was these two lordly houses that characterized Großkarlbach's history.

Until 1969, the municipality belonged to the district of Frankenthal, which was abolished that year, and Großkarlbach was then assigned to the newly created district of Bad Dürkheim. Three years later came the assignment to the likewise newly created Verbandsgemeinde of Grünstadt-Land.

=== Religion ===
In 2007, 50.8% of the inhabitants were Evangelical and 20.6% Catholic. The rest belonged to other faiths or adhered to none.

== Politics ==
=== Municipal council ===
The council is made up of 16 council members, who were elected at the municipal election held on 7 June 2009, and the honorary mayor as chairman.

The municipal election held on 7 June 2009 yielded the following results:

	SPD	CDU	GRÜNE	FWG	Total
2009	7	3	-	6	16 seats
2004	7	3	1	5	16 seats

=== Coat of arms ===
The German blazon reads: In Grün ein silberner Wellenpfahl.

The municipality's arms might in English heraldic language be described thus: Vert a pale wavy argent.

The arms were approved by the now abolished Regierungsbezirk Rheinhessen-Pfalz in Neustadt in 1984, and they go back to a court seal from 1501. The “pale wavy” (wavy vertical stripe) is a canting charge for the placename's ending, —bach, which means “brook”.

== Culture and sightseeing ==
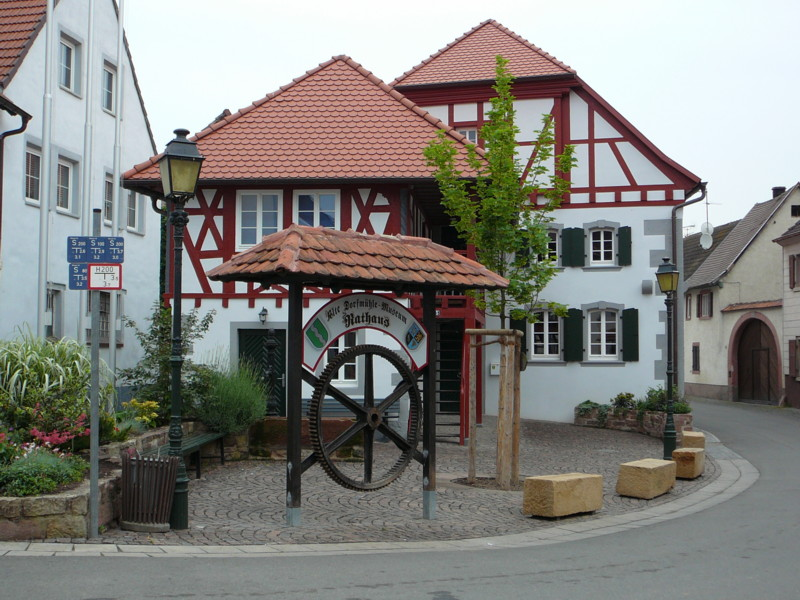
Village mill

=== Monumental buildings ===
In Großkarlbach, five of the formerly seven mills are still standing. The Dorfmühle (“Village mill”) has housed since restoration work was finished in 2007 the Mühlenmuseum Leiningerland (“Leiningerland Mill Museum”), the mayor's office and the municipal archive as well as meeting rooms for youth, seniors and conferences.

Great wineries with their timber-frame houses characterize the municipality. Other points of interest are the 48 m-tall tower at the Evangelical church in the village centre and the pottery factory, where such things as flowerpots are made.

In the contest Unser Dorf soll schöner werden (“Our village should become lovelier”), Großkarlbach won a bronze plaque in 1987.

=== Festivals ===
In Großkarlbach, a few traditional festivals are held. Among them are the Kändelgassenfest (a wine festival) on the last weekend in July, the Kerwerummel in September (church consecration festival, or kermis) and a small Christmas market. Also worth mentioning is the Lange Nacht des Jazz (“Long Night of Jazz”), which first took place in 2002 and in 2006 was part of Federal President Horst Köhler’s Deutschland – Land der Ideen (“Germany – Land of Ideas”) campaign. Furthermore, there are many smaller events staged by local clubs.

== Economy and infrastructure ==
=== Tourism and winegrowing ===
The municipality lies near the German Wine Route in the holiday region of Leiningerland (the lands once held by the Counts of Leiningen). There are holiday homes and two hotels. The most important branch of agriculture is winegrowing.

=== Transport ===
Großkarlbach is linked to the Autobahn A 6 (Saarbrücken–Mannheim) through the Grünstadt interchange 5 km away.

Until 1939, Großkarlbach was the terminus of a narrow-gauge railway known locally as the Lokalbahn or Bembel. It ran by way of Dirmstein and Heßheim to Frankenthal and also had access to Ludwigshafen over tram tracks.

== Famous people ==
- Anton Spiehler (1795–1867) was a bishop's secretary, spiritual adviser and cathedral capitulary of the Bishopric of Speyer, assistant head seminarian and Summus Custos (Latin for Highest Keeper) of Speyer Cathedral. He served from 1819 to 1827 as Großkarlbach's Catholic parish priest.
- August Brehm (1854–1931) was cathedral capitulary, cathedral deacon and cathedral provost of the Bishopric of Speyer, as well as Honorary Papal Prelate, Monsignore and Privy Councillor of the Free State of Bavaria. He served from 1883 to 1889 as Großkarlbach's parish priest.
