= Kindenheim =

- Municipality
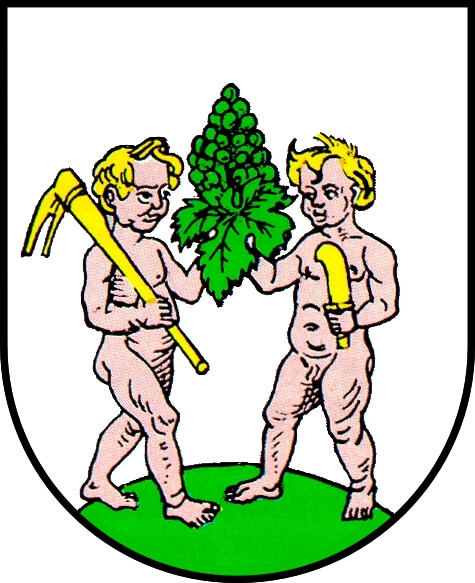
- Coat of arms

- Location of Kindenheim within Bad Dürkheim district
- Interactive map of Kindenheim
- Location within Germany Location within Rhineland-Palatinate
- Coordinates: 49°36′40″N 08°09′51″E
- Country: Germany
- State: Rhineland-Palatinate
- District: Bad Dürkheim
- Municipal assoc.: Leiningerland

Government
  - Mayor (2019–24): Albrecht Wiegner (FW)

Area
  - Total: 8.96 km^{2} (3.46 sq mi)
- Elevation: 172 m (564 ft)

Population (2025-12-31)
  - Total: 1,051
  - Density: 117/km^{2} (304/sq mi)
- Time zone: UTC+01:00 (CET)
  - Summer (DST): UTC+02:00 (CEST)
- Postal codes: 67271
- Dialling codes: 06359
- Vehicle registration: DÜW
- Website: www.kindenheim.de

Kindenheim is an Ortsgemeinde – a municipality belonging to a Verbandsgemeinde, a kind of collective municipality – in the Bad Dürkheim district in Rhineland-Palatinate, Germany.

== Geography ==
=== Location ===
The municipality lies in the northwest of the Rhine-Neckar urban agglomeration and is a winegrowing centre in the Palatinate near the north end of the German Wine Route. It belongs to the Verbandsgemeinde of Leiningerland, whose seat is in Grünstadt, although that town is itself not in the Verbandsgemeinde.

== History ==
In 817, Kindenheim had its first documentary mention as Cunerono. Later it was called Cunnenheim or Kinnenheim. Until 1969 it belonged to the now abolished Frankenthal district, and in 1972 it was assigned to the newly formed Verbandsgemeinde of Grünstadt-Land

=== Religion ===
In 2007, 59.8% of the inhabitants were Evangelical and 12.5% Catholic. The rest belonged to other faiths or adhered to none.

== Politics ==
=== Municipal council ===
The council is made up of 16 council members, who were elected at the municipal election held on 7 June 2009, and the honorary mayor as chairman.

The municipal election held on 7 June 2009 yielded the following results:

| 2009 | SPD | FWG | Pro Kindenheim | Total |
|---|---|---|---|---|
| seats | 5 | 7 | 4 | 16 |

=== Coat of arms ===
The German blazon reads: In Silber auf grünem Grund zwei unbekleidete naturfarbene Kinder, von denen das rechte in der Rechten geschultert eine goldene Hacke, das linke in der Linken ein goldenes Rebmesser (Sesel) hält, während beide mit der anderen Hand zwischen sich eine aufrecht stehende grüne Traube halten.

The municipality’s arms might in English heraldic language be described thus: Argent on a mount vert two naked children proper crined Or, the one in dexter holding in his dexter hand a two-pronged hoe resting on his shoulder of the third, the one in sinister holding in his sinister hand a billhook of the third, both supporting with their free hands a bunch of grapes palewise reversed with leaves of the second.

The arms were approved by the Mainz Ministry of the Interior in 1967 and go back to a court seal from 1544, albeit in modified form. The two children are canting for the municipality’s name, Kind being the German word for “child” and Kinder the word for “children”.

== Culture and sightseeing ==
=== Buildings ===
The Kreutzenberger winery can be considered a monument in building form. The Bauhaus architect Otto Prott built the house in the economically hardship-stricken 1920s in the style of Modernity. In 2005, the house was carefully expanded in the style of those times with the addition of a winepress house with a wine tasting parlour on the rooftop terrace. The architect Heribert Hamann earned the Architekturpreis Wein for this.

=== Families of Kindenheim ===
There are a number of families whose history spans nearly 500 years in Kindenheim. They include:

Keller - The Keller Family trace their descent from Martin and Anne Keller, and their children - Hanns Keller (b. 1605, Kindenheim) and his sister Appolonnia Keller (b. c. 1614). Today Kellergasse commemorates the family.

Seyb - Deobaldt Seyb (born c. 1610) arrived in Kindenheim during the time of the Thirty Years War. It is said that he originated from the Palatine, and served as an officer in the army. Deobaldt Seyb married Appolonnia Keller (b. c. 1614 - 1658), of Kindenheim, in 1630. He died before 1652, and was buried in Kindenheim. The Seyb family traces their descent from their three surviving children - Hans Caspar Seyb, Johannes Seyb and Anna Katherina Seyb

Gudex - The Gudex Family are said to have arrived in Kindenheim, via Morstadt, from France, following the Edict of Fontainebleau, in 1685.

Kippenberger

Voght

Kissell

Neiss

=== Diaspora ===
New Zealand

Johann Georg Seyb. Arrived in New Zealand in 1865 on the "Tudor". Left Kindenheim to avoid being drafted into the army and travelled to New Zealand via Hamburg and London. Married Christina Gudex, of Kindenheim, on 16 November 1873 at the Presbyterian Church, Timaru, New Zealand. Their daughter Caroline Philobena Seyb was an amateur painter. Descendants include clothes designer Marilyn Seyb; artist Wayne Seyb; political scientist Brian Roper;

Michael Seyb. Arrived in New Zealand in Dec 1870 on the "Zealandia". Married Sylvia Louise Morgan, of Timaru, in 1883.

Katharina Seyb. Arrived in New Zealand in 1863 on the "Sebastapol". Married Henry Aker, of Wurttenburg, in 1864 at Christchurch.

Johann Georg/Peter Gudex and Anna Elizabetha Gudex (nee Blasius). Arrived in New Zealand in 1873 on the "Crusader" with their children Christian Gudex, Christina Gudex and Georg Gudex.

Michael George Gudex. Arrived in New Zealand in 1866 on the "Mermaid". Married Jane McCully, of Ireland, in 1884 at Geraldine.

Maria Magdalena Gudex. Arrived in New Zealand in 1870 on the "Zelandia". Married James Lewis, of Wales, in 1872 at Christchurch.

Kippenburger. Peter Kippenberger, wife Barbara (nee Mann) and seven children arrived in New Zealand in 1863 on the "Sebastapol". The family settled in Timaru. Descendants include Major-General Sir Howard Karl Kippenberger, KBE, CB, DSO, ED, (28 January 1897 - 5 May 1957);

United States of America

Brazil

Russia

Australia

=== Regular events ===
- The kermis (church consecration festival, locally known as the Kerwe) is held every year on the first weekend in September.
- The shooting club holds its local championships each year in the sport and leisure hall.
- The TV Kindenheim (gymnastic club) yearly stages its sport week at the clubhouse and on the sporting grounds.
