= Obrigheim, Rhineland-Palatinate =

Obrigheim
- Municipality
- Coat of arms

- Location of Obrigheim within Bad Dürkheim district
- Interactive map of Obrigheim
- Location within Germany Location within Rhineland-Palatinate
- Coordinates: 49°32′39″N 08°12′16″E
- Country: Germany
- State: Rhineland-Palatinate
- District: Bad Dürkheim
- Municipal assoc.: Leiningerland

Government
  - Mayor (2019–24): Stefan Muth (SPD)

Area
  - Total: 10.81 km^{2} (4.17 sq mi)
- Elevation: 147 m (482 ft)

Population (2025-12-31)
  - Total: 2,801
  - Density: 259.1/km^{2} (671.1/sq mi)
- Time zone: UTC+01:00 (CET)
  - Summer (DST): UTC+02:00 (CEST)
- Postal codes: 67283
- Dialling codes: 06359
- Vehicle registration: DÜW
- Website: www.obrigheim-pfalz.de

Obrigheim (Pfalz) (German pronunciation: [ˈoːbʁɪçˌhaɪm]) is an Ortsgemeinde – a municipality belonging to a Verbandsgemeinde, a kind of collective municipality – in the Bad Dürkheim district in Rhineland-Palatinate, Germany. It lies in the northwest of the Rhine-Neckar urban agglomeration.

== Geography ==
=== Location ===
Obrigheim's main centre and its small outlying centres lie in a row from southwest to northeast on the middle Eisbach, where the uplands gradually give way to the Upper Rhine Plain. Along a stretch of some 5 km of the brook, the centres follow one after the other, first Albsheim on the right bank and Mühlheim on the left, then Heidesheim und Colgenstein on the right bank and finally the main centre, also called Obrigheim, and the Neuoffstein factory location, both on the left bank.

Obrigheim belongs to the Verbandsgemeinde of Leiningerland, whose seat is in Grünstadt, although that town is itself not in the Verbandsgemeinde.

== History ==
In 1969, the smaller neighbouring municipalities of Albsheim, Colgenstein-Heidesheim and Mühlheim an der Eis were amalgamated with Obrigheim. In the same year came a change in district since the district of Frankenthal in which Obrigheim had been up to that time was abolished. In 1972, the municipality was assigned to the newly formed Verbandsgemeinde of Grünstadt-Land.

The main centre is known from 1250 onwards and could then well have been held by the Counts of Leiningen. The ending —heim points to a Frankish origin, but there is no written evidence for this. A local nobleman named Ulricus de Obernkeim was mentioned in 1352 in a decree from the council of the Imperial City of Speyer; he might have been from Obrigheim. The Weißenburg Monastery, in what is now Wissembourg in nearby Alsace, France, enfeoffed Count Friedrich VII of Leiningen-Dagsburg with holdings in Obrigheim. From 1467 to 1505, the village found itself in Electoral Palatinate’s ownership. In 1557 it was called Oberkum uff der wissen. This almost matches the village’s local dialectal name Owwerkumm. On a map from 1735 it is called Oberheim; in 1739, the name that is today customary first crops up.

The outlying centres mostly had their first documentary mentions even earlier: Mühlheim in 761, Albsheim in 788, Colgenstein about 1000 and Heidesheim in 1277. Upstream from Mühlheim, where the Eisbach still flows down a steep slope and has cut deep into the land, there were once at least two mills (the name “Mühlheim” means “Millhome”). Another, a sawmill, stood on flatter land in Neuoffstein. The Heidesheimer Schloss, a palatial castle belonging to the House of Leiningen-Heidesheim was burnt down in 1794 by French Revolutionary troops.

On 7 June 1969 the municipality of Obrigheim was newly formed out of the dissolved municipalities of Albsheim an der Eis, Colgenstein-Heidesheim, Mühlheim an der Eis and Obrigheim.

=== Religion ===
In 2007, 55.1% of the inhabitants were Evangelical and 18.7% Catholic. The rest belonged to other faiths or adhered to none.

== Politics ==
=== Municipal council ===
The council is made up of 20 council members, who were elected at the municipal election held on 7 June 2009, and the honorary mayor as chairman.

The municipal election held on 7 June 2009 yielded the following results:

	SPD	CDU	FWG	Total
2009	9	2	9	20 seats
2004	7	2	11	20 seats

=== Coat of arms ===
The German blazon reads: Von Blau und Gold geteilt, oben ein rotbewehrter silberner Adler, einen waagrecht gelegten goldenen Schlüssel in den Fängen haltend, unten eine widersehende, springende, am Hals von einem roten Pfeil durchbohrte rote Hirschkuh.

The municipality's arms might in English heraldic language be described thus: Per fess azure an eagle displayed argent armed and langued gules holding in his talons fesswise a key Or, wards to base, and Or a doe salient reguardant pierced to the neck with an arrow bendwise sinister, all of the third.

The arms were approved in 1970 by the now abolished Regierungsbezirk administration in Neustadt. The doe comes from Obrigheim's old coat of arms, and the eagle is a charge drawn from Albsheim's, Colgenstein-Heidesheim's and Mühlheim's arms, and ultimately from those borne by the House of Leiningen. The key stands for Weißenburg Monastery.

== Culture and sightseeing ==
Of Obrigheim's five churches, the four that are today Evangelical hold importance for building history.

- Albsheim

The church in Albsheim was built in Romanesque times; in 1520 and 1794 it underwent conversions. Here is found the Palatinate’s oldest organ that is still played. It was built in 1730 by Johann Valentin Senn from Seebach, which is today an outlying centre of Bad Dürkheim.

- Colgenstein

The first church in Colgenstein was mentioned as early as 991. Of the Romanesque successor building, only the 12th-century tower is still preserved. The pairs of windows on its four floors grouped one over the other call to mind the ones at Speyer Cathedral, and the bell that rings here is probably the Palatinate’s oldest. A Late Gothic font comes from 1509.

- Mühlheim

The Mühlheim church was built by Count Jofried of Leiningen-Hardenburg in the 1330s. In the early 17th century, the House of Leiningen-Heidesheim had it converted to a palace church, whereby the comital family’s tomb came into being in the quire. The organ built in 1738 by Johann Michael Stumm is the best preserved Stumm organ in the Palatinate.

- Obrigheim

The Obrigheim church was originally run as a branch parish of Colgenstein and was called Saint Giles’s Chapel (Kapelle St. Ägidius). Of the old chapel, the tower from the time about 1500 is still standing. The church was newly built in 1865, and in 1910, one floor was added to the tower.

== Economy and infrastructure ==
=== Economy ===
The biggest employer in the municipality has been since 1873 the sugar factory in Neuoffstein, which today is a manufacturing location of Südzucker AG. As well as the sugar beets processed there, there is also winegrowing. The land area of nearly 1 000 ha under cultivation is divided into 75% sugar beet fields and 25% vineyards.

=== Transport ===
The municipality’s centres are bound together by Landesstraße ("state road") 395, which runs from Grünstadt to Worms. Bundesstraße 271 can be reached near Grünstadt-Asselheim, and over this (5 km to the south at the Grünstadt interchange) the A 6 motorway. The Bundesstraße 47 (Kaiserslautern–Worms) runs past some 4 km to the north. This has an interchange farther northeast on the A 61 motorway (Koblenz–Speyer).

The Palatine Northern Railway between Monsheim and Grünstadt runs through the municipality's western outskirts along the edge of the outlying centre of Albsheim. The Albsheim (Eis) halt is served by Regionalbahn trains running on Rhineland-Palatinate timetabling. The Lower Eis Valley Railway (Grünstadt–Worms), which formerly crossed the municipal area along the Eisbach and mainly served the sugar factory, is however disused along its eastern section (sugar factory–Worms). Public transport is integrated into the VRN, whose fares therefore apply.

== Famous people ==
=== Sons and daughters of the town ===
- Countess Maria Louise Albertine of Leiningen-Falkenburg-Dagsburg (1729–1818), grandmother of Prussian Queen Luise
- Peter Martin (1888–1970), politician (NSDAP)
