= Leiningerland (Verbandsgemeinde) =

Municipality in Rhineland-Palatinate, Germany

- Verbandsgemeinde
- Location of Leiningerland within Bad Dürkheim district
- Interactive map of Leiningerland
- Location within Germany Location within Rhineland-Palatinate
- Coordinates: 49°34′N 8°11′E
- Country: Germany
- State: Rhineland-Palatinate
- District: Bad Dürkheim
- Seat: Grünstadt
- Subdivisions: 21 municipalities

Area
  - Total: 145.16 km^{2} (56.05 sq mi)

Population (2025-12-31)
  - Total: 31,457
  - Density: 216.71/km^{2} (561.27/sq mi)
- Time zone: UTC+01:00 (CET)
  - Summer (DST): UTC+02:00 (CEST)
- Website: www.vg-l.de

Leiningerland is a Verbandsgemeinde ("collective municipality") in the district of Bad Dürkheim, in Rhineland-Palatinate, Germany. The seat of the Verbandsgemeinde is in Grünstadt, which is not part of the Verbandsgemeinde. It was formed on 1 January 2018 by the merger of the former Verbandsgemeinden Grünstadt-Land and Hettenleidelheim. It takes its name from the historic area Leiningerland.

The Verbandsgemeinde Leiningerland consists of the following Ortsgemeinden ("local municipalities"):

1. Altleiningen
2. Battenberg
3. Bissersheim
4. Bockenheim an der Weinstraße
5. Carlsberg
6. Dirmstein
7. Ebertsheim
8. Gerolsheim
9. Großkarlbach
10. Hettenleidelheim
11. Kindenheim
12. Kirchheim an der Weinstraße
13. Kleinkarlbach
14. Laumersheim
15. Mertesheim
16. Neuleiningen
17. Obersülzen
18. Obrigheim
19. Quirnheim
20. Tiefenthal
21. Wattenheim
