= Wolfgang Wolf =

German football player and manager

Personal information
- Date of birth: 24 September 1957 (age 69)
- Place of birth: Tiefenthal, West Germany
- Height: 1.84 m (6 ft 0 in)
- Position: Defender

Senior career*
Years	Team	Apps	(Gls)
–1976	VfR Hettenleidelheim		
1976–1988	1. FC Kaiserslautern	248	(11)
1988–1992	Stuttgarter Kickers	131	(9)
1992–1993	VfR Mannheim		
Total		379	(20)
- 1994–1998: Stuttgarter Kickers
- 1998–2003: VfL Wolfsburg
- 2003–2005: 1. FC Nürnberg
- 2005–2007: 1. FC Kaiserslautern
- 2009: Skoda Xanthi
- 2010–2011: Kickers Offenbach
- 2011–2012: Hansa Rostock
- 2019–2020: 1. FC Lokomotive Leipzig
- * Club domestic league appearances and goals

Wolfgang Wolf (born 24 September 1957) is a German football coach and a former player.

== Career ==
Wolf was born in Tiefenthal. As a player, he spent twelve seasons in the Bundesliga with 1. FC Kaiserslautern and Stuttgarter Kickers.

== Coaching career ==
Wolf spent eight more seasons in the Bundesliga as a coach with VfL Wolfsburg, 1. FC Nürnberg and 1. FC Kaiserslautern. In July 2009 Wolf joined Super League Greece club Skoda Xanthi but left the club in September 2009 for personal reasons. On 9 February 2010, Wolf was named as the new head coach of Kickers Offenbach, replacing Steffen Menze. In October 2019, he became new manager of 1. FC Lokomotive Leipzig.

== Personal life ==
His son Patrick Wolf also became a professional footballer. In June 2012, Wolf signed his son while working as manager for Hansa Rostock.

== Coaching record ==
As of 30 June 2020

Team	From	To	Record					
Team	From	To	G	W	D	L	Win %	Ref.
Stuttgarter Kickers	26 October 1994	18 February 1998	115	61	27	27	53.04	
VfL Wolfsburg	23 March 1998	4 March 2003	195	77	53	65	39.49	
1. FC Nürnberg	30 April 2003	1 November 2005	89	33	19	37	37.08	
1. FC Kaiserslautern	21 November 2005	11 April 2007	52	17	18	17	32.69	
Skoda Xanthi	1 July 2009	15 September 2009	3	0	1	2	0.00	
Kickers Offenbach	9 February 2010	26 February 2011	45	20	11	14	44.44	
Hansa Rostock	7 December 2011	3 September 2012	27	6	8	13	22.22	
1. FC Lokomotive Leipzig	20 October 2019	30 June 2020	17	10	7	0	58.82	
Total			543	224	144	175	41.25	—

== Honours ==
- DFB-Pokal finalist: 1980–81
