= Quirnheim =

- Municipality
- Coat of arms

- Location of Quirnheim within Bad Dürkheim district
- Interactive map of Quirnheim
- Location within Germany Location within Rhineland-Palatinate
- Coordinates: 49°35′04″N 08°07′35″E
- Country: Germany
- State: Rhineland-Palatinate
- District: Bad Dürkheim
- Municipal assoc.: Leiningerland

Government
  - Mayor: Hubert Deubert (SPD)

Area
  - Total: 4.45 km^{2} (1.72 sq mi)
- Elevation: 273 m (896 ft)

Population (2025-12-31)
  - Total: 784
  - Density: 176/km^{2} (456/sq mi)
- Time zone: UTC+01:00 (CET)
  - Summer (DST): UTC+02:00 (CEST)
- Postal codes: 67280
- Dialling codes: 06359
- Vehicle registration: DÜW
- Website: www.quirnheim.de

Quirnheim (Palatine German: Querm) is an Ortsgemeinde – a municipality belonging to a Verbandsgemeinde, a kind of collective municipality – in the Bad Dürkheim district in Rhineland-Palatinate, Germany. It lies in the northwest of the Rhine-Neckar urban agglomeration.

== Geography ==
=== Location ===
The municipality lies in the Palatinate on a rise at the edge of the Haardt near the north end of the German Wine Route. Until 1969 it belonged to the now abolished district of Frankenthal. It has belonged to the Verbandsgemeinde of Leiningerland, whose seat is in Grünstadt (although that town is itself not in the Verbandsgemeinde) since it was formed in 2018.

=== Constituent communities ===
To the village belong the Ortsteile of Quirnheim-Tal and Boßweiler.

== History ==
In May 771, Saint Mary’s and Saint Martin’s Church (Kirche St. Maria und St. Martin) had its first documentary mention. It is therefore said to be the district’s oldest church. The outlying centre of Boßweiler was mentioned as early as 767 in the Lorsch codex. In 1467, Quirnheim came to be under the ownership of the Counts of Leiningen-Westerburg. In the 17th century, Quirinus von Merz was enfeoffed with both places.

=== Religion ===
In 2007, 41.9% of the inhabitants were Evangelical and 32.6% Catholic. The rest belonged to other faiths or adhered to none.

== Politics ==
=== Municipal council ===
The council is made up of 12 council members (as at municipal election held on 7 June 2009).

The municipal election held on 7 June 2009 yielded the following results:

2009	SPD	CDU	FWG	WG Würtz	Total
Seats	2	3	4	3	12

=== Coat of arms ===
The German blazon reads: In geteiltem und oben gespaltenem Schild, oben rechts wiederum gespalten, rechts von Silber und Blau dreizeilig geschachtet, links in Gold ein goldbekrönter halber schwarzer Adler am Spalt, oben links in Blau ein rotbewehrter und -bezungter silberner Löwe, unten in Silber ein blaues Hufeisen mit abwärts gekehrten Stollen.

The municipality’s arms might in English heraldic language be described thus: Per fess, in chief per pale, in dexter per pale chequy of six argent and azure and Or a demi-eagle reguardant sable couped at the partition, in sinister a lion rampant of the first armed and langued gules, in base argent a horseshoe of the second.

The arms were approved in 1926 by the Bavarian State Ministry of the Interior and date from a 1674 court seal.

== Culture ==
=== Regular events ===
- Erbsenkerwe (“Pea Fair”), held in July
- Dorfkerwe (“Village Fair”), held in the first week in October

=== Air sports ===
On one of the municipality’s hills is found the model aircraft site of the Luftfahrtvereins Grünstadt und Umgebung (“Grünstadt and Area Air Travel Club”).

=== Museum ===
On the lands of the former US Army Nike-Hercules launcher area for C Btry 2nd/1st ADA. is found a commercial area that houses, among other things, a motorcycle and technology museum run by unpaid workers. Right next to it are the airfield and the abandoned Nike-Hercules IFC (Integrated Fire Control) Area of C Btry 2nd/1st ADA.

== Famous people ==
The forebears of German resistance fighter against Hitler and 20 July plot co-conspirator Albrecht Mertz von Quirnheim were connected to the village.
