= Patrick Wolf (German footballer) =

German footballer

Personal information
- Date of birth: 12 February 1989 (age 37)
- Place of birth: Kaiserslautern, West Germany
- Height: 1.88 m (6 ft 2 in)
- Position: Centre-back

Team information
- Current team: TuS 07 Steinbach
- Number: 2

Youth career
- –2001: Stuttgarter Kickers
- 2001–2002: Braunschweiger SC
- 2002–2003: VfL Wolfsburg
- 2003–2005: Nürnberg
- 2005–2006: Kaiserslautern

Senior career*
Years	Team	Apps	(Gls)
2008–2009	Nürnberg II	10	(0)
2009–2011	Wacker Burghausen	66	(2)
2011–2012	Hessen Kassel	28	(4)
2012–2013	Hansa Rostock	6	(0)
2013–2014	Wormatia Worms	15	(2)
2014–2015	Energie Cottbus	1	(0)
2015–2017	FSV Zwickau	24	(1)
2017–2018	Schweinfurt 05	23	(0)
2018–2020	Lokomotive Leipzig	36	(3)
2020–2022	Astoria Walldorf II	37	(2)
2022	VfR Grünstadt	10	(0)
2023–	TuS 07 Steinbach	10	(0)
- * Club domestic league appearances and goals as of 18:12, 12 October 2023 (UTC)

Patrick Wolf (born 12 February 1989) is a German professional footballer who plays for TuS 07 Steinbach.

He is the son of former Bundesliga player and manager Wolfgang Wolf. In June 2012, while working as manager for Hansa Rostock his father signed him for the club.
