= Mertesheim =

- Municipality
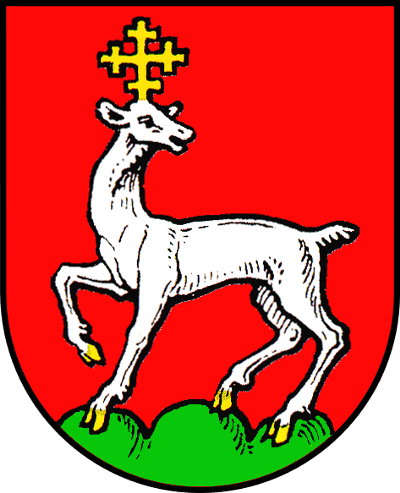
- Coat of arms

- Location of Mertesheim within Bad Dürkheim district
- Interactive map of Mertesheim
- Location within Germany Location within Rhineland-Palatinate
- Coordinates: 49°34′18″N 08°08′08″E
- Country: Germany
- State: Rhineland-Palatinate
- District: Bad Dürkheim
- Municipal assoc.: Leiningerland

Government
  - Mayor (2019–24): Kurt Waßner

Area
  - Total: 2.20 km^{2} (0.85 sq mi)
- Elevation: 201 m (659 ft)

Population (2025-12-31)
  - Total: 407
  - Density: 185/km^{2} (479/sq mi)
- Time zone: UTC+01:00 (CET)
  - Summer (DST): UTC+02:00 (CEST)
- Postal codes: 67271
- Dialling codes: 06359
- Vehicle registration: DÜW
- Website: www.mertesheim.de

Mertesheim is an Ortsgemeinde – a municipality belonging to a Verbandsgemeinde, a kind of collective municipality – in the Bad Dürkheim district in Rhineland-Palatinate, Germany.

== Geography ==
=== Location ===
The municipality lies in the northwest of the Rhine-Neckar urban agglomeration and belongs to the Verbandsgemeinde of Leiningerland, whose seat is in Grünstadt, although that town is itself not in the Verbandsgemeinde.

== History ==
In 771, Meldrisheim had its first documentary mention.

It is mentioned in the Wormser wall-building ordinance from around 900 as one of the places that shared responsibility for maintaining the city wall of Worms.

Until 1969 it belonged to the now abolished district of Frankenthal. Currently it is in the district of Bad Dürkheim, and it joined the newly formed Verbandsgemeinde of Grünstadt-Land in 1972.

== Religion ==
In 2007, 43.5% of the inhabitants were Catholic and 35.3% Evangelical. The rest belonged to other faiths or adhered to none.

== Politics ==
=== Municipal council ===
The council is made up of 8 council members, who were elected by majority vote at the municipal election held on 7 June 2009, and the honorary mayor as chairman.

=== Mayor ===
The mayor of Mertesheim is Kurt Waßner, elected in June 2019.

=== Coat of arms ===
The German blazon reads: In Rot auf grünem Dreiberg ein schreitender widersehender silberner Hirsch mit einem goldenen Wiederkreuz statt des Geweihs.

The municipality's arms might in English heraldic language be described thus: Gules on a mount of three in base vert a stag passant reguardant argent unguled Or with a cross crosslet of the same instead of attires.

The German blazon, however, does not mention the stag's golden hooves (“unguled Or”).

The arms were approved in 1926 by the Bavarian State Ministry of the Interior and date from a 16th-century seal.

== Economy and infrastructure ==
=== Transport ===
Mertesheim lies on the Eis Valley Railway, which runs between Grünstadt and Ramsen and is served by scheduled Regionalbahn trains. Public transport is integrated into the VRN, whose fares therefore apply.
