= Carlsberg, Germany =

Carlsberg
- Municipality
- Coat of arms

- Location of Carlsberg within Bad Dürkheim district
- Interactive map of Carlsberg
- Location within Germany Location within Rhineland-Palatinate
- Coordinates: 49°30′14″N 08°02′30″E
- Country: Germany
- State: Rhineland-Palatinate
- District: Bad Dürkheim
- Municipal assoc.: Leiningerland
- Subdivisions: 2

Government
  - Mayor (2019–24): Werner Majunke (CDU)

Area
  - Total: 7.03 km^{2} (2.71 sq mi)
- Elevation: 285 m (935 ft)

Population (2025-12-31)
  - Total: 3,552
  - Density: 505/km^{2} (1,310/sq mi)
- Time zone: UTC+01:00 (CET)
  - Summer (DST): UTC+02:00 (CEST)
- Postal codes: 67316
- Dialling codes: 06356
- Vehicle registration: DÜW
- Website: www.carlsbergpfalz.de

Carlsberg (IPA: [ˈkaʁlsbɛʁk]) is an Ortsgemeinde – a municipality belonging to a Verbandsgemeinde, a kind of collective municipality – in the Bad Dürkheim district in Rhineland-Palatinate, Germany.

== Geography ==
=== Location ===
The municipality lies at the north edge of the Palatinate Forest between the Haardt range in the south and the Autobahn A 6 in the north in the Leiningerland at an elevation of 285 m above sea level. Carlsberg belongs to the Verbandsgemeinde of Leiningerland, whose seat is in Grünstadt.

The outlying centre of Hertlingshausen lies in the northern Palatinate Forest and is crossed by the river Eckbach, which rises in the part of the municipal area known as Kleinfrankreich (“Little France”). Since Carlsberg is a scattered settlement, it is not possible to say where Hertlingshausen ends and the main centre begins.

=== Constituent communities ===
Carlsberg's Ortsteile are Carlsberg and Hertlingshausen.

== History ==
In 1754, Carlsberg, originally a dispersed settlement, had its first documentary mention. Count Georg II of Leiningen had a new settlement laid out in a clearing in the early 18th century for Huguenots who had fled persecution, and in 1726 he named it after his son Georg Karl I August Ludwig of Leiningen-Westerburg-Neuleiningen.

Older than Carlsberg itself is its outlying centre of Hertlingshausen. As of 1160 there was an Augustinian convent in Hertlingshausen as a branch of the Höningen Monastery. This had its first documentary mention in 1212 as Hertingeshausen. After a great fire in 1460 and a sacking in 1520, the convent was forsaken. The local lore has it that the village of Hertlingshausen was built out of the convent's stones in 1585.

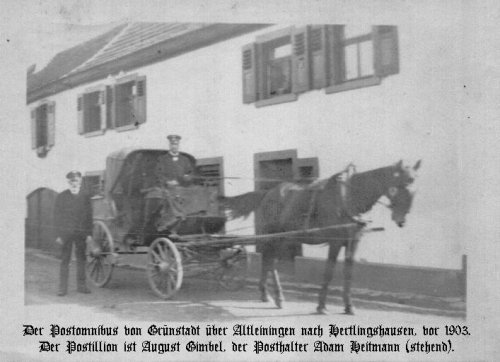
Post coach in Hertlingshausen 1903

After the Second World War, both Carlsberg and Hertlingshausen belonged to the now abolished district of Frankenthal (Landkreis Frankenthal). In the course of administrative reform in Rhineland-Palatinate, Hertlingshausen was amalgamated with Carlsberg on 7 June 1969 and the new, merged municipality was at the same time put in the newly formed district of Bad Dürkheim (Landkreis Bad Dürkheim). In 1972, Carlsberg was grouped into the new Verbandsgemeinde of Hettenleidelheim. Hertlingshausen's old coat of arms also became Carlsberg's.

== Politics ==
=== Municipal council ===
The council is made up of 20 council members, who were elected at the municipal election held on 7 June 2009, and the honorary mayor as chairman.

The municipal election held on 7 June 2009 yielded the following results:

- CDU (9 seats, speaker Rita Franke)
- SPD (5 seats, speaker Dieter Winnewisser)
- FWG (5 seats, speaker Gerd Schmitt)
- ICH (1 seat, speaker Thorsten Schneider)

=== Mayor ===
The municipality's highest office is held by Dr. Werner Majunke (CDU) who has two deputies, Michael Schumacher (CDU) and Valentin Hoffmann (SPD).

=== Coat of arms ===
The municipality's arms might be described thus: Gules a cross pattée Or, in dexter chief a fleur-de-lis argent, in sinister chief an eagle displayed of the same, issuant from dexter base a lance bendwise sinister of the second, and issuant from sinister base a firtree palewise vert.

The arms were approved on 25 February 1970 by the now abolished Regierungsbezirk of Rheinhessen-Pfalz in Neustadt an der Weinstraße and match those approved by the Ministry of the Interior in Mainz in 1963 and formerly borne by Hertlingshausen, which had become part of Carlsberg on 15 January 1969.

The old Leiningen-Westerburg village of Hertlingshausen arose out of the like-named convent. The lily refers to the nuns. The gold cross pattée (that is, cross with “feet” at its outermost ends) on the red field recalls the Westerburg lordship while the eagle is the charge once borne by the House of Leiningen, who also once held sway here. The lance and the firtree are simply references to the “wild and forest” (Wild und Wald) and are meant to characterize the municipality's scenic location.

=== Town partnerships ===
- (Germany) Leißling an der Saale, Saxony-Anhalt

=== Citizen friendships ===
- (Germany) Carlsberg in der Lausitz, Saxony

== Culture and sightseeing ==
=== Regular events ===
- Eingeschärrtes am neuen Sauhäuschen vom VVH, a kind of communal cookout using a beechwood ember fire, held on the third weekend in March
- Liederkranz 1925 e. V. men's singing club's Summer Night Festival, held on a weekend in June
- Power beim Bauer - last weekend in June
- Kermises (church consecration festivals, locally known as the Kerwe) in Carlsberg on the second weekend in July, and in Hertlingshausen on the first weekend in August.
- Christmas Market and Advent Exhibition around the community centre, held on the first weekend in Advent

=== Sport ===
In the TuS Hertlingshausen 1904, the municipality has a local sport club offering above all football and gymnastics.

=== Nature ===
The Naturfreundehaus Rahnenhof (“Nature Lovers’ House”), lying in the woods somewhat west of Hertlingshausen, is known well beyond the region.

== Economy and infrastructure ==
=== Education ===
- Grundschule am Atzenberg (primary school)

== Famous people ==
=== Sons and daughters of the town ===
- Hermann Euler (1878–1961), dentist
- Otto Wilms (1915-1992), Palatine local and dialectal poet
- Hans Ponader (1911-1988), Palatine local and dialectal poet
