= Tiefenthal =

- Municipality
- Coat of arms

- Location of Tiefenthal within Bad Dürkheim district
- Interactive map of Tiefenthal
- Location within Germany Location within Rhineland-Palatinate
- Coordinates: 49°32′18″N 08°06′14″E
- Country: Germany
- State: Rhineland-Palatinate
- District: Bad Dürkheim
- Municipal assoc.: Leiningerland

Government
  - Mayor (2019–24): Edwin Gaub (CDU)

Area
  - Total: 4.21 km^{2} (1.63 sq mi)
- Elevation: 290 m (950 ft)

Population (2025-12-31)
  - Total: 874
  - Density: 208/km^{2} (538/sq mi)
- Time zone: UTC+01:00 (CET)
  - Summer (DST): UTC+02:00 (CEST)
- Postal codes: 67311
- Dialling codes: 06351
- Vehicle registration: DÜW

Tiefenthal (German pronunciation: [ˈtiːfn̩ˌtaːl]) is an Ortsgemeinde – a municipality belonging to a Verbandsgemeinde, a kind of collective municipality – in the Bad Dürkheim district in Rhineland-Palatinate, Germany.

== Geography ==
=== Location ===
The municipality lies in a small hollow with northern slopes between the Eisbach and Eckbach valleys in the Palatinate. Tiefenthal belongs to the Verbandsgemeinde of Leiningerland, whose seat is in Grünstadt. Until 1969, the municipality belonged to the now abolished district of Frankenthal.

== History ==
In 1318, the municipality had its first documentary mention as Dyfendal.

The protestant church, built under the Dukes of Leiningen, contains pulpit scarved in oak and a three-spaced ceiling painting. It is known for the 3 first church bells after the second world war delivered to the protestantic Palatinate in 1949.

=== Religion ===
In 2007, 45.4% of the inhabitants were Evangelical and 35.4% Catholic. The rest belonged to other faiths or adhered to none.

== Politics ==
=== Municipal council ===
The council is made up of 12 council members, who were elected at the municipal election held on 7 June 2009, and the honorary mayor as chairman.

The municipal election held on 7 June 2009 yielded the following results:

	SPD	CDU	WGR	Total
2009	3	5	4	12 seats
2004	2	5	5	12 seats

=== Coat of arms ===
The German blazon reads: In Rot ein goldenes Tatzenkreuz.

The municipality's arms might in English heraldic language be described thus: Gules a cross pattée humetty Or.

The arms were approved by the now defunct Regierungsbezirk administration in Neustadt and date from a 1724 seal. They are borrowed from the arms once borne by the Counts of Leiningen-Westerburg, to whom Tiefenthal belonged.

== Economy and infrastructure ==
=== Transport ===
A few kilometres away lies the Wattenheim interchange on the Autobahn A 6. Historically, a branch of the Eis Valley Railway once linked the municipality by a train station some 1,5 km away, with Grünstadt.

== Famous people ==
=== Sons and daughters of the town ===
- Wolfgang Wolf (born 1957), former football coach for 1. FC Kaiserslautern
- Arno Wolf (born 1959), former footballer with 1. FC Kaiserslautern
