= Kleinkarlbach =

- Municipality
- Coat of arms

- Location of Kleinkarlbach within Bad Dürkheim district
- Interactive map of Kleinkarlbach
- Location within Germany Location within Rhineland-Palatinate
- Coordinates: 49°32′19″N 08°08′59″E
- Country: Germany
- State: Rhineland-Palatinate
- District: Bad Dürkheim
- Municipal assoc.: Leiningerland

Government
  - Mayor (2019–24): Daniel Krauß

Area
  - Total: 2.70 km^{2} (1.04 sq mi)
- Elevation: 174 m (571 ft)

Population (2025-12-31)
  - Total: 797
  - Density: 295/km^{2} (765/sq mi)
- Time zone: UTC+01:00 (CET)
  - Summer (DST): UTC+02:00 (CEST)
- Postal codes: 67271
- Dialling codes: 06359
- Vehicle registration: DÜW
- Website: www.kleinkarlbach.de

Kleinkarlbach is an Ortsgemeinde – a municipality belonging to a Verbandsgemeinde, a kind of collective municipality – in the Bad Dürkheim district in Rhineland-Palatinate, Germany.

== Geography ==
=== Location ===
The municipality is a winegrowing centre and lies in the Palatinate in the northwest of the Rhine-Neckar urban agglomeration. Kleinkarlbach belongs to the Verbandsgemeinde of Leiningerland, formed in 2018, whose seat is in Grünstadt, although that town is itself not in the Verbandsgemeinde. Until 1969, the municipality belonged to the now abolished district of Frankenthal. Kleinkarlbach lies at the entrance to the Leiningen Valley (Leininger Tal) on the river Eckbach, which is part of the Rhine’s catchment area.

== History ==
In 770, Kleinkarlbach had its first documentary mention in the Lorsch codex. In 873 it belonged to the Murbach Monastery. In 1309 it was granted as a fief to the House of Leiningen. After the French Revolution it belonged to the Department of Mont-Tonnerre (or Donnersberg in German) and from 1813 to 1816 lay Kleinkarlbach under Austrian administration, before it was annexed to the Kingdom of Bavaria as part of the Rheinkreis.

=== Religion ===
In 1555, the Reformation was introduced into the Leiningerland (lands held by the Counts of Leiningen) and Kleinkarlbach thereby became Lutheran.

In 2007, 52.9% of the inhabitants were Evangelical and 23.8% Catholic. The rest belonged to other faiths or adhered to none.

== Politics ==
=== Municipal council ===
The council is made up of 12 council members, who were elected at the municipal election held on 7 June 2009, and the honorary mayor as chairman.

The municipal election held on 7 June 2009 yielded the following results:

	FWG	SPD	CDU	WG	Total
2004	7	3	2	-	12 seats
2009	5	3	2	2	12 seats

=== Coat of arms ===
The German blazon reads: In Gold ein grüner Wellenbalken.

The municipality's arms might in English heraldic language be described thus: Or a fess wavy vert.

The arms were approved in 1982 by the Regierungsbezirk government in Neustadt and date from a 1452 court seal in which the wavy stripe were slanted rather than fess (horizontal).

== Famous people ==
=== Honorary citizens ===
- 1973: Irmgard Spiess
- 2004: Honorary Consul Dr. Dieter Spiess
