= Weinstraße (region) =

Coordinates: 49.4904°N 8.1761°E

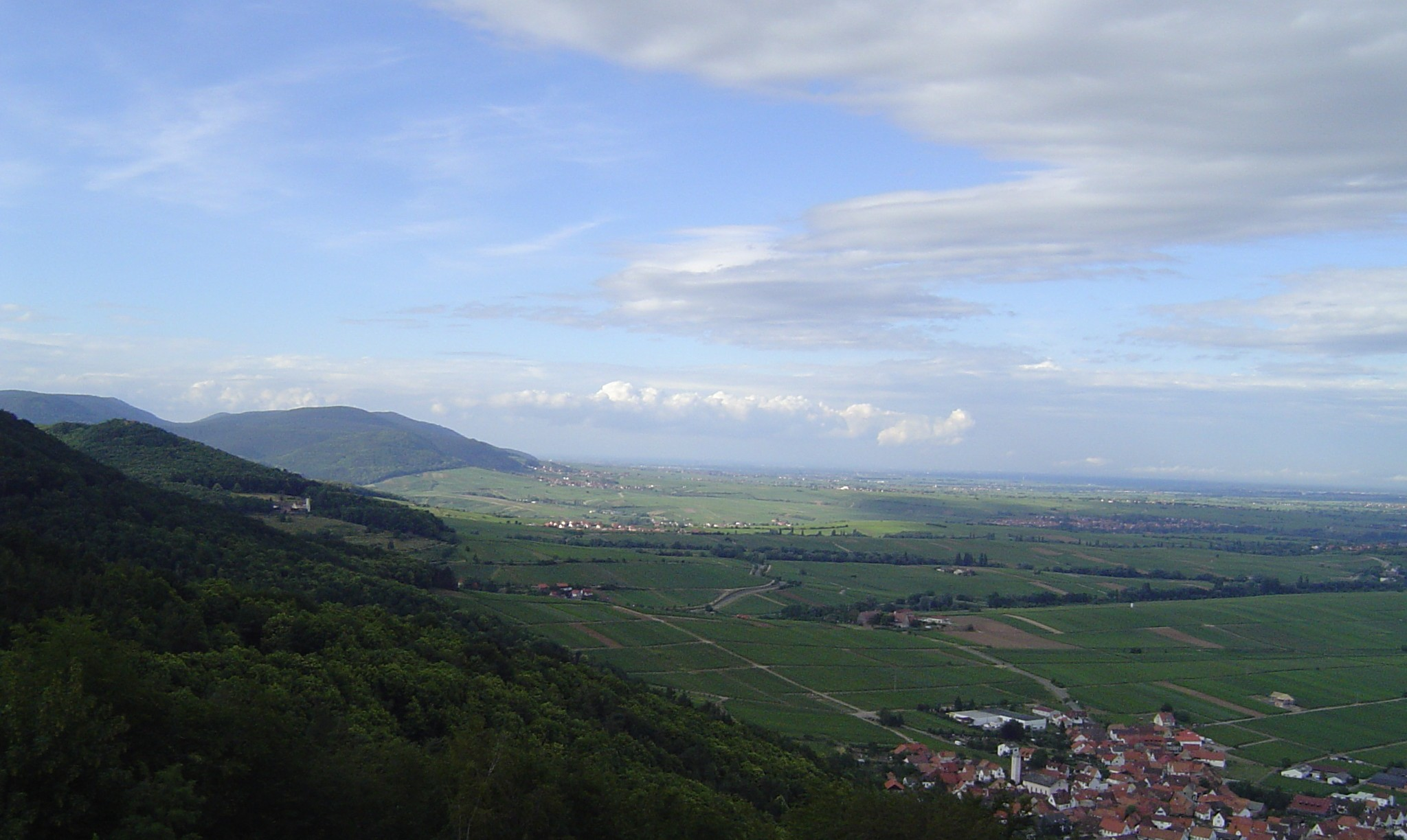
View from the Madenburg near Eschbach looking north. Left: the Haardt; centre: the Weinstraße hills; right: the Rhine Plain

The Weinstraße (German pronunciation: [ˈvaɪnˌʃtʁaːsə]), also referred to as the Middle Haardt (Mittelhardt), is a region within the Palatinate in the German state of Rhineland-Palatinate that was named after the German Wine Road or Deutsche Weinstraße.

== Geography ==
In a geological sense the Weinstraße is an altitudinal belt (Höhenstufe) that is just under 150 metres high in the centre. It is part of the South German Scarplands and forms a hilly zone, about 85 kilometres long and 10 to 15 kilometres wide, that separates the Upper Rhine Plain from the mountains of the Palatine Forest. Its eastern edge is formed by the Haardt with its highest point, the Kalmit (673 m). The German Wine Road runs longitudinally through the region.

== Climate ==
Favourable thermals cause warm air to climb up the slopes at night, whilst cold air flows down onto the plain, so that on the vine-covered hillsides of the Weinstraße there is a low risk of frost at the time when the vines flower in spring. Thanks to these favourable climatic conditions, fig and almond trees are also grown here in the open as are kiwi fruits and lemons.

== Economy ==
The Weinstraße is the largest part of the Palatine wine region. The main sources of income are wine growing and tourism, which are often marketed together. The wine-growing districts of the Weinstraße are described in the article on the Palatine wine region.

== Transport ==
The Bundesstraße 271 federal road runs along the northern part of the Weinstraße, whilst the southern part is crossed by the B 38 federal road and A 65 motorway. Two railways cross the area: the line from Landau to Neustadt (formerly the Palatine Maximilian Railway) and the Neustadt to Monsheim line (formerly the Palatine Northern Railway). Train services on both run to the Rheinland-Pfalz-Takt timetable system.

== See also ==
- Südliche Weinstraße
