= Bissersheim =

- Municipality
- Coat of arms

- Location of Bissersheim within Bad Dürkheim district
- Interactive map of Bissersheim
- Location within Germany Location within Rhineland-Palatinate
- Coordinates: 49°32′09″N 08°12′15″E
- Country: Germany
- State: Rhineland-Palatinate
- District: Bad Dürkheim
- Municipal assoc.: Leiningerland

Government
  - Mayor (2019–24): Elmar Reichert

Area
  - Total: 2.57 km^{2} (0.99 sq mi)
- Elevation: 141 m (463 ft)

Population (2025-12-31)
  - Total: 483
  - Density: 188/km^{2} (487/sq mi)
- Time zone: UTC+01:00 (CET)
  - Summer (DST): UTC+02:00 (CEST)
- Postal codes: 67281
- Dialling codes: 06359
- Vehicle registration: DÜW
- Website: www.bissersheim.de

Bissersheim is an Ortsgemeinde – a municipality belonging to a Verbandsgemeinde, a kind of collective municipality – in the Bad Dürkheim district in Rhineland-Palatinate, Germany.

== Geography ==
=== Location ===
Bissersheim lies in the northwest of the Rhine-Neckar urban agglomeration. It belongs to the Verbandsgemeinde of Leiningerland, whose seat is in Grünstadt, although that town is itself not in the Verbandsgemeinde. It sits at an elevation of 141 m above sea level near the northern end of the German Wine Route. To the west rises the Haardt, the Palatinate Forest’s eastern edge, and in the east stretches the Upper Rhine Plain. Flowing through the municipality from west to east is the river Eckbach, also regionally known as die Eck.

== History ==
In 774, Bissersheim had its first documentary mention as Bizziricheshaim.

After the Second World War, it belonged to the district of Frankenthal (Landkreis Frankenthal), until this was abolished in 1969. After the transfer to the new district of Bad Dürkheim had been made the following year, Bissersheim was likewise grouped into the newly formed Verbandsgemeinde of Grünstadt-Land in 1972.

== Politics ==
=== Municipal council ===
The council is made up of 8 council members, who were elected by majority vote at the municipal election held on 7 June 2009, and the honorary mayor as chairwoman

=== Coat of arms ===
The municipality’s arms might be described thus: Argent, in base a dragon slain sans wings and hindlegs vert standing on which Saint Margaret of Antioch vested gules, robed of the first, booted, crined and crowned Or, in her dexter hand a cross-staff botonny, the lower arm in the dragon’s chest.

Saint Margaret of Antioch appears in the coat of arms as one of the local church’s patron saints. The church, Pfarrkirche St. Blasius und St. Margaretha (“Parish Church of Saint Margaret and Saint Blaise”), also has Saint Blaise as a patron.

== Culture and sightseeing ==
=== Regular events ===
The Bissersheimer Weinkerwe (“Bissersheim Wine Fair”) is held each year on the second weekend in August.

== Economy and infrastructure ==
The municipality is a winegrowing centre in the Palatinate wine region and looks back on a long winegrowing tradition.

== Famous people ==
=== Sons and daughters of the town ===
- Abraham Kuhn (1838–1900), professor of medicine at the University of Strasbourg (then Straßburg).
