= Bad Dürkheim (district) =

Coordinates: 49°30′N 8°10′E

- District
- Flag Coat of arms
- Country: Germany
- State: Rhineland-Palatinate
- Capital: Bad Dürkheim

Government
  - District admin.: Hans-Ulrich Ihlenfeld (CDU)

Area
  - Total: 595 km^{2} (230 sq mi)

Population (31 December 2025)
  - Total: 133,863
  - Density: 225/km^{2} (583/sq mi)
- Time zone: UTC+01:00 (CET)
  - Summer (DST): UTC+02:00 (CEST)
- Vehicle registration: DÜW
- Website: kreis-bad-duerkheim.de

Bad Dürkheim (German pronunciation: [ˌbaːt ˈdʏʁkhaɪm]; Palatine German: Därkem) is a district in Rhineland-Palatinate, Germany. It is bounded by (from the west and clockwise) the districts of Kaiserslautern, Donnersbergkreis and Alzey-Worms, the city of Worms, the Rhein-Pfalz-Kreis, the city of Neustadt/Weinstraße, the districts of Südliche Weinstraße, the city of Landau (the Taubensuhl/Fassendeich forest part of the city), the district Südwestpfalz, and the city of Kaiserslautern.

== History ==
The eastern rim of the Palatinate Forest has been densely populated since the Middle Ages. Several medieval castles show the significance of the region during the early Holy Roman Empire. The district was established in 1969 by combining portions of the former districts of Neustadt and Frankenthal.

=== Dialect ===
The dialect of Bad Dürkheim and environs is closer to the Pennsylvania Dutch language — also known as Pennsylvania German or as Deitsch, the native tongue of the Amish and others — than any other dialect of German.

== Geography ==
The district is located on the eastern rim of the Palatinate Forest a line of hills called the Haardt. The German Wine Road (Deutsche Weinstraße), a scenic road along the best vineyards of the Palatinate wine region, runs through the district from north to south. The district is sometimes called "the heart of the Palatinate".

The best wine-growing area is the Mittelhaardt ("Middle Haardt"), where the Riesling wine is cultivated, which is considered to be one of the best German wines.

== Coat of arms ==
The coat of arms displays:

- The heraldic lion of the Palatinate;
- Grapes symbolising the Wine Road and the vineyards;
- The heraldic eagle of the former county of Leiningen.

== Towns and municipalities ==
Clickable map of towns and municipalities in the district

Verband-free towns
1. Bad Dürkheim
2. Grünstadt
Verband-free municipality
1. Haßloch

Verbandsgemeinden
1. Deidesheim; 1. Deidesheim^{1, 2}; 2. Forst an der Weinstraße; 3. Meckenheim; 4. Niederkirchen bei Deidesheim; 5. Ruppertsberg; 2. Freinsheim; 1. Bobenheim am Berg; 2. Dackenheim; 3. Erpolzheim; 4. Freinsheim^{1, 2}; 5. Herxheim am Berg; 6. Kallstadt; 7. Weisenheim am Berg; 8. Weisenheim am Sand	3. Lambrecht; 1. Elmstein; 2. Esthal; 3. Frankeneck; 4. Lambrecht^{1, 2}; 5. Lindenberg; 6. Neidenfels; 7. Weidenthal	4. Leiningerland [seat: Grünstadt]; 1. Altleiningen; 2. Battenberg; 3. Bissersheim; 4. Bockenheim an der Weinstraße; 5. Carlsberg; 6. Dirmstein; 7. Ebertsheim; 8. Gerolsheim; 9. Großkarlbach; 10. Hettenleidelheim; 11. Kindenheim; 12. Kirchheim an der Weinstraße; 13. Kleinkarlbach; 14. Laumersheim; 15. Mertesheim; 16. Neuleiningen; 17. Obersülzen; 18. Obrigheim; 19. Quirnheim; 20. Tiefenthal; 21. Wattenheim	5. Wachenheim; 1. Ellerstadt; 2. Friedelsheim; 3. Gönnheim; 4. Wachenheim^{1, 2}
^{1}seat of the Verbandsgemeinde; ^{2}town
