= Gerolsheim =

- Municipality
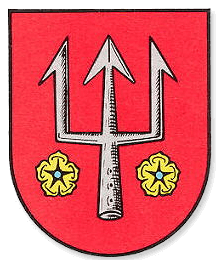
- Coat of arms

- Location of Gerolsheim within Bad Dürkheim district
- Interactive map of Gerolsheim
- Location within Germany Location within Rhineland-Palatinate
- Coordinates: 49°32′50″N 08°15′50″E
- Country: Germany
- State: Rhineland-Palatinate
- District: Bad Dürkheim
- Municipal assoc.: Leiningerland

Government
  - Mayor (2019–24): Erich Weyer

Area
  - Total: 4.81 km^{2} (1.86 sq mi)
- Elevation: 104 m (341 ft)

Population (2025-12-31)
  - Total: 1,796
  - Density: 373/km^{2} (967/sq mi)
- Time zone: UTC+01:00 (CET)
  - Summer (DST): UTC+02:00 (CEST)
- Postal codes: 67229
- Dialling codes: 06238
- Vehicle registration: DÜW
- Website: www.gerolsheim.de

Gerolsheim is an Ortsgemeinde – a municipality belonging to a Verbandsgemeinde, a kind of collective municipality – in the Bad Dürkheim district in Rhineland-Palatinate, Germany.

== Geography ==
=== Location ===
The municipality lies in the northwest of the Rhine-Neckar urban agglomeration. It belongs to the Verbandsgemeinde of Leiningerland, which was formed in 2018, and whose seat is in Grünstadt, although that town is itself not in the Verbandsgemeinde.

== History ==
In 915, Gerolsheim had its first documentary mention as Geroltesheimero.

Until 1969, the municipality belonged to the now abolished district of Frankenthal. In 1972 came the amalgamation with the newly formed Verbandsgemeinde of Grünstadt-Land.

The Sondermülldeponie Gerolsheim (“Special Garbage Dump”) was closed in 2003 after decades-long efforts by residents to reach that goal.

=== Religion ===
In 2007, 41.2% of the inhabitants were Evangelical and 29.5% Catholic. The rest belonged to other faiths or adhered to none.

== Politics ==
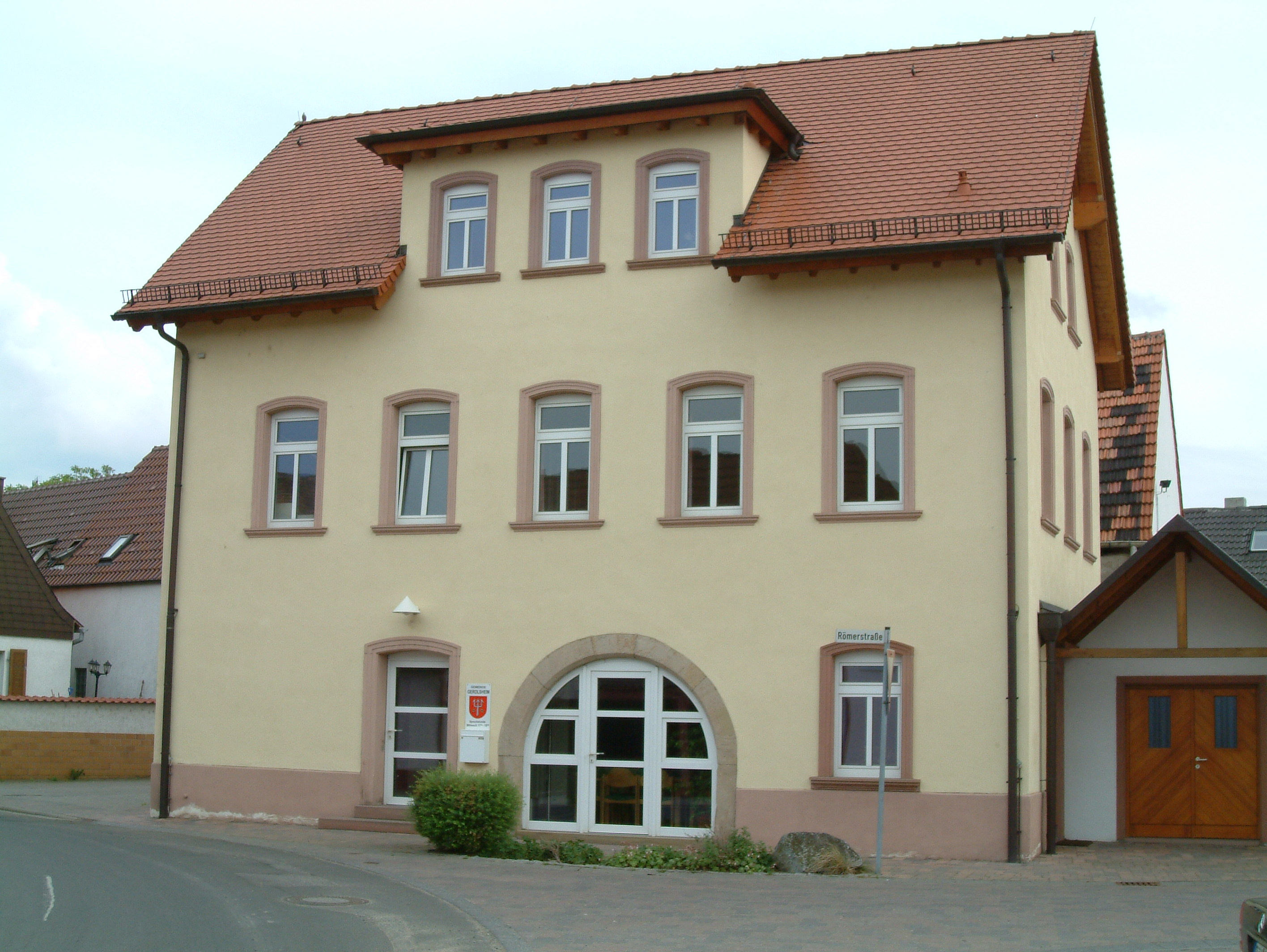
Gerolsheim town hall

=== Municipal council ===
The council is made up of 16 council members, who were elected at the municipal election held on 7 June 2009, and the honorary mayor as chairman.

The municipal election held on 7 June 2009 yielded the following results:

	SPD	CDU	FWG	Total
2009	4	3	9	16 seats
2004	5	-	11	16 seats

=== Mayor ===
In the mayoral election, 1,421 citizens were eligible to vote, of whom 919 actually went to the polls. Ortsbürgermeister (Mayor) Erich Weyer (FWG) was confirmed in his office with 713 votes (79.7%) against opponent Volker Rossel’s (SPD) 182 votes (20.3%).

=== Coat of arms ===
In Rot ein dreizackiges silbernes Fischspeereisen, unten beidseits von je einer goldenen Rose mit blauen Butzen beseitet.

The municipality’s arms is described thus: In Rot ein dreizackiges silbernes Fischspeereisen, unten beidseits von je einer goldenen Rose mit blauen Butzen beseitet. It might in English heraldic language be described thus: Gules the head of a trident palewise argent, the points to chief, between two roses Or seeded azure in base.

The arms were approved in 1926 by the Bavarian State Ministry of the Interior and go back to a seal from 1541. The trident stands for the church’s patron saint, Leodegar.

== Famous people ==
=== Honorary citizens ===
- 23 October 2004 Adolf Buch, 40 years as a municipal politician, just under 25 of which as mayor
- 23 October 2004 Ilse Buch (Adolf Buch’s wife), 40 years of social and club work
