= Rhine-Neckar =

Coordinates: 49.4438°N 8.4756°E

Rhine-Neckar Metropolitan Region Metropolregion Rhein-Neckar
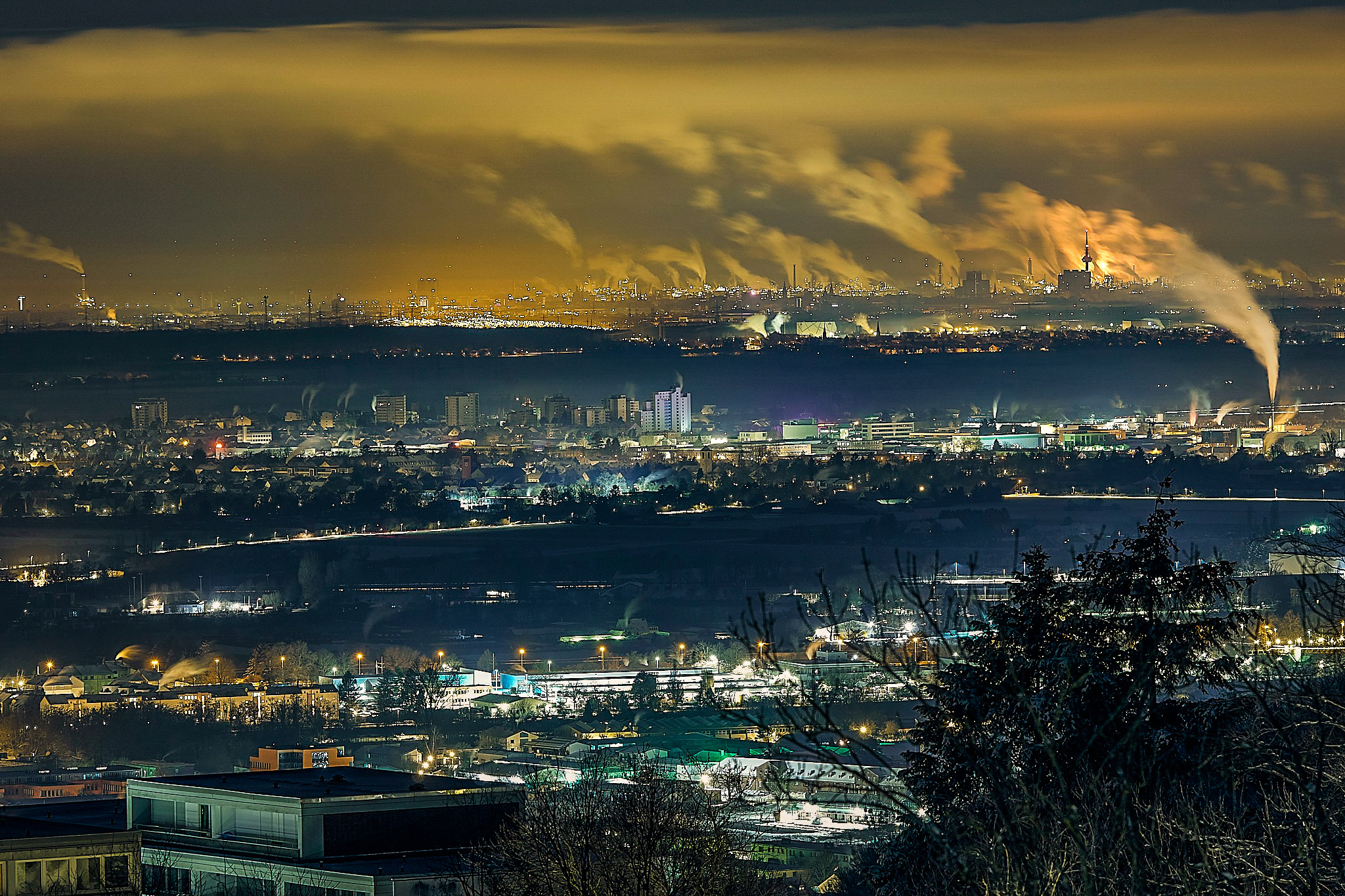
- View of the industrial landscape of Mannheim and Ludwigshafen from Heidelberg

- Location of the Rhine-Neckar Metropolitan Region in Germany
- Country: Germany
- States: Hesse; Baden-Württemberg; Rhineland-Palatinate
- Largest Cities: Mannheim; Ludwigshafen; Heidelberg

Government
  - Type: Metropolregion Rhein-Neckar GmbH

Area
  - Metro: 5,637 km^{2} (2,176 sq mi)

Population
  - Metro: 2,362,000
  - Metro density: 419/km^{2} (1,090/sq mi)

GDP
  - Metro: €105.201 billion (2021)
- Time zone: UTC+1 (CET)
- Website: www.m-r-n.com

The Rhine-Neckar Metropolitan Region (German: Metropolregion Rhein-Neckar, pronounced [metʁoˈpoːlʁeˌɡi̯oːn ˌʁaɪnˈnɛkaʁ]), often referred to as the Rhein-Neckar Triangle, is a polycentric metropolitan region located in south western Germany, between the Frankfurt/Rhine-Main region to the north and the Stuttgart Region to the south-east.

Rhine-Neckar has a population of some 2.4 million, with major cities including Mannheim, Ludwigshafen and Heidelberg. Other cities include the former free imperial cities of Speyer and Worms. The metro area also encompasses parts of the Baden and Palatinate wine regions, the second largest vine region of the country (Deutsche Weinstraße), and territory from the three federal states of Baden-Württemberg, Rhineland-Palatinate and Hesse. It has a strong local identity as a successor to the historical Electorate of the Palatinate state.

The region is named after the rivers Rhine and Neckar, which join at Mannheim. Since 2005, the region has been officially recognized as a European Metropolitan Area.

== Economy ==
The Rhine-Neckar region is one of Germany’s driving economic forces, with global players such as BASF, SAP, Heidelberger Druckmaschinen and Fuchs Petrolub. It is also home to various SMEs. It is known as the largest technology cluster in Europe, also known as IT-Cluster Rhine-Main-Neckar.

In 2010, the regional gross value added was around EUR 67.5 billion. Just under 58% of the goods produced in the region are exported. The main sectors are the automotive industry, mechanical engineering and plant construction, chemicals, information technology, biotechnology and life sciences, energy and the environment, and the creative and cultural industries. Rhine-Neckar has a leading position both nationally and internationally in many of these fields.

The region had a GDP of EUR 92.6 billion in 2015. The GDP per inhabitant is EUR 39,139, and the Rhine-Neckar region is among the areas with the lowest unemployment in Germany. According to the local chamber of commerce and industry, 134,000 companies are registered in the region. The Rhine-Neckar region also has high-volume purchasing power, making it an attractive location for retailers and investors. Per capita income in 2008 was EUR 19,300, exceeding the national average by EUR 300.

== Transportation ==
The metropolitan region is a strong economic driver and a centre of the European transportation network. The central location and infrastructure of the region makes it accessible nationally and internationally. Individual and delivery traffic can connect to the national highway network, with highways A5/A67 and A61/A65 from north to south and the A6 from east to west, as well as the respective federal highways.

Connection to Frankfurt International Airport takes 31 minutes by ICE train from Mannheim Hbf. In addition, domestic business air travel is served by Mannheim City Airport with an own local airline (Rhein-Neckar Air) and a second regional airport in Speyer.

Travelling by rail also provides direct access to national major cities as well as European capitals. With around 240 long-distance departures daily from the central station, Mannheim is the second largest ICE terminal in Germany and connects the region to the European long-distance rail network. The Rhine-Neckar public transport system (VRN), with the Rhine-Neckar S-Bahn as its backbone, provides infrastructure and connects to neighbouring regions.

The Mannheim/Ludwigshafen harbour complex has the second-largest railway yard in Germany and one of the largest inland ports in Europe, and is a central hub for the European handling of goods. The Mannheim railway yard dispatches up to 5,300 freight cars daily.

== Education ==
The region has a long history when it comes to the pursuit of scientific discovery. In 1386, the University of Heidelberg was founded as Germany’s first university and remains one of the most prestigious universities in Germany. Around 94,000 students are enrolled at the region’s institutes of higher education, roughly one in ten of whom are international students.

The Rhine-Neckar region contains 22 institutes of higher education, as well as research institutions such as the European Molecular Biology Laboratory and the German Cancer Research Center.

== Cities and districts ==
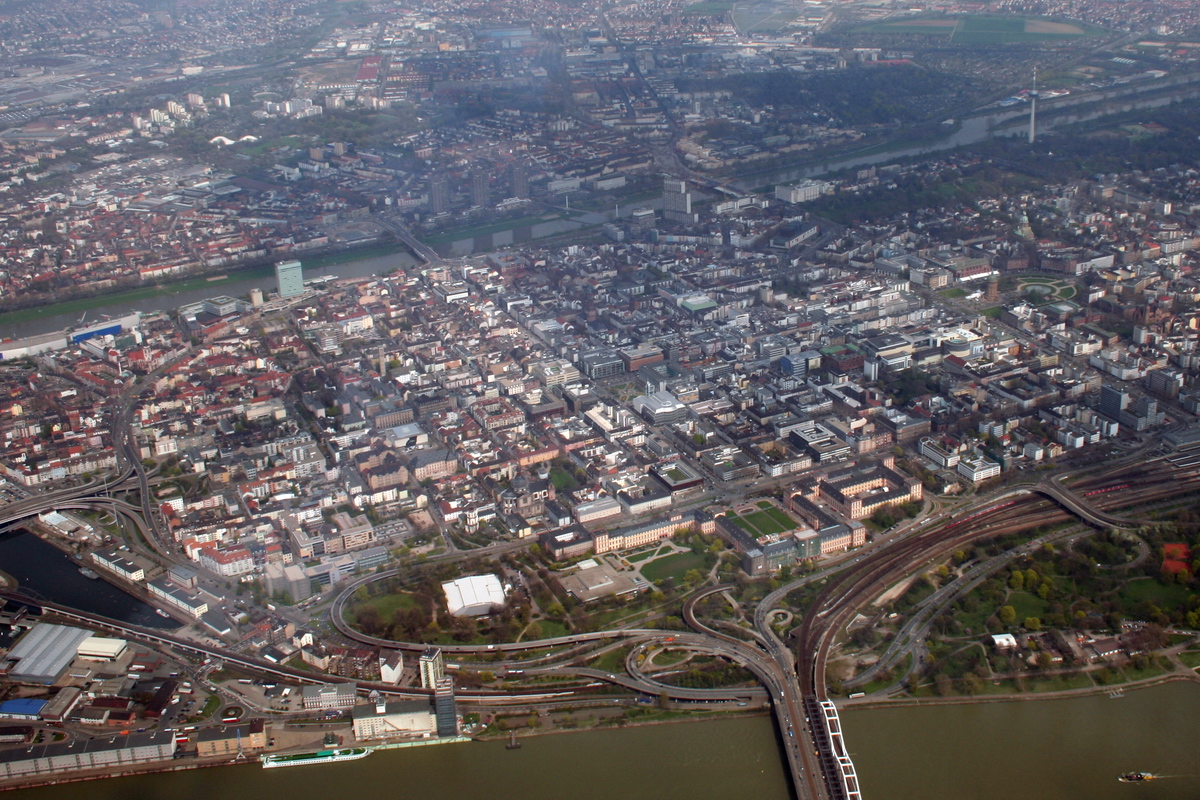
Aerial view of Mannheim

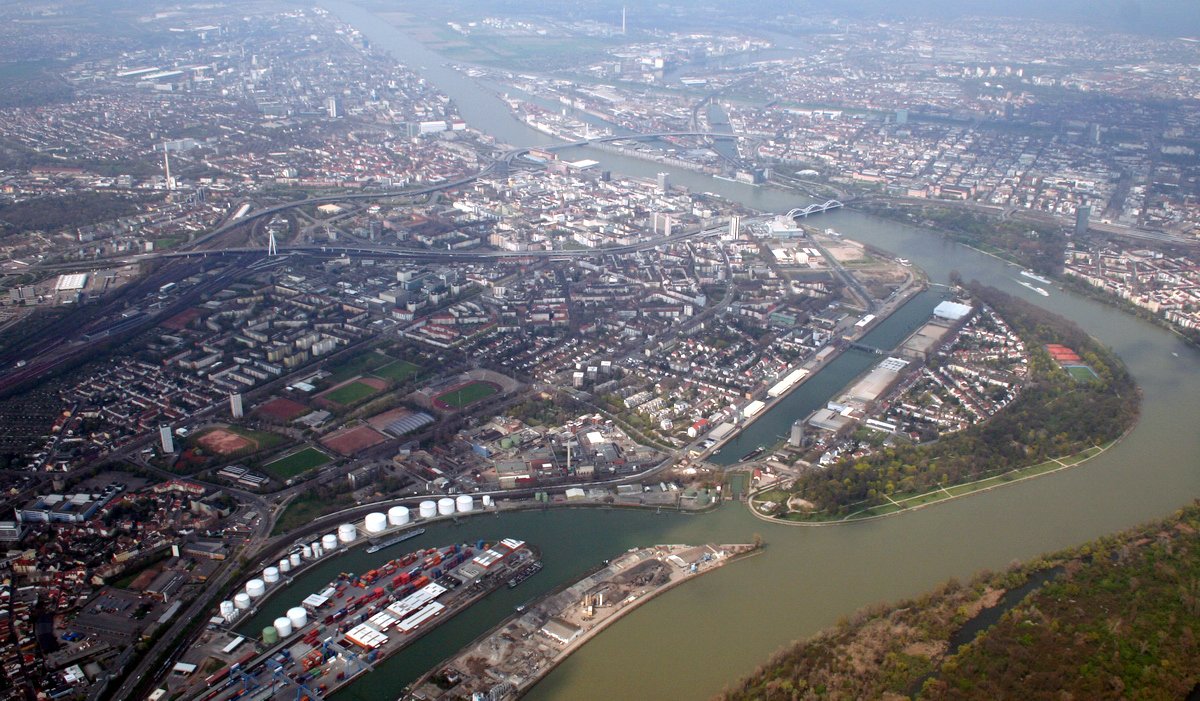
Aerial view of Ludwigshafen

Baden-Württemberg

- Mannheim (324,787 inhabitants)
- Heidelberg (145,642 inhabitants)
- Rhein-Neckar-Kreis (531,723 inhabitants, including Sinsheim, Walldorf and Weinheim)
- Neckar-Odenwald-Kreis (151,043 inhabitants)

Hesse

- Kreis Bergstraße (265,868 inhabitants, including Bensheim and Heppenheim)

Rhineland-Palatinate

- Ludwigshafen (163,002 inhabitants)
- Frankenthal (Pfalz) (47,534 inhabitants)
- Landau in der Pfalz (41,687 inhabitants)
- Neustadt an der Weinstraße (53,898 inhabitants)
- Speyer (50,280 inhabitants)
- Worms (80,955 inhabitants)
- Rhein-Pfalz-Kreis (148,428 inhabitants)
- Landkreis Bad Dürkheim (134,869 inhabitants)
- Landkreis Germersheim (124,894 inhabitants)
- Landkreis Südliche Weinstraße (110,658 inhabitants)

== Culture and nature ==
The Rhine-Neckar region has more than 80 theatres, more than 200 museums and galleries.

Three World Heritage Sites – Lorsch Abbey, frontiers of the Roman Empire and Speyer Cathedral – and more than 200 castles, cathedrals and palaces dot the historic landscape, including world-famous sites such as Heidelberg Castle, Schwetzingen Castle and Hambach Castle.

There are three nature parks (the Palatinate Forest, Neckartal-Odenwald and the Bergstrasse-Odenwald geopark) within the region, as well as four wine-growing areas (Baden, Hessische Bergstrasse, Palatinate and Rhine-Hesse).

In terms of sports, the Rhine-Neckar region features professional teams like Adler Mannheim (ice hockey), Rhein-Neckar Löwen (handball), and SV Sandhausen and 1899 Hoffenheim (association football). Notable venues include the Golf Club St. Leon-Rot and the Hockenheimring motorsport circuit. The region also has an Olympic training centre. With more than 2,700 sports associations, the region offers a broad range of non-professional sports activities.

The SAP Arena built in 2005 serves as the region's most important indoor event venue. The Rhein-Neckar-Arena opened in 2009 as the new home of 1899 Hoffenheim.

== See also ==
- Metropolitan regions in Germany
