= Eckbach Mill Path =

Footpath in the Rhineland-Palatinate, Germany

Eckbach Mill Path Eckbach-Mühlenwanderweg
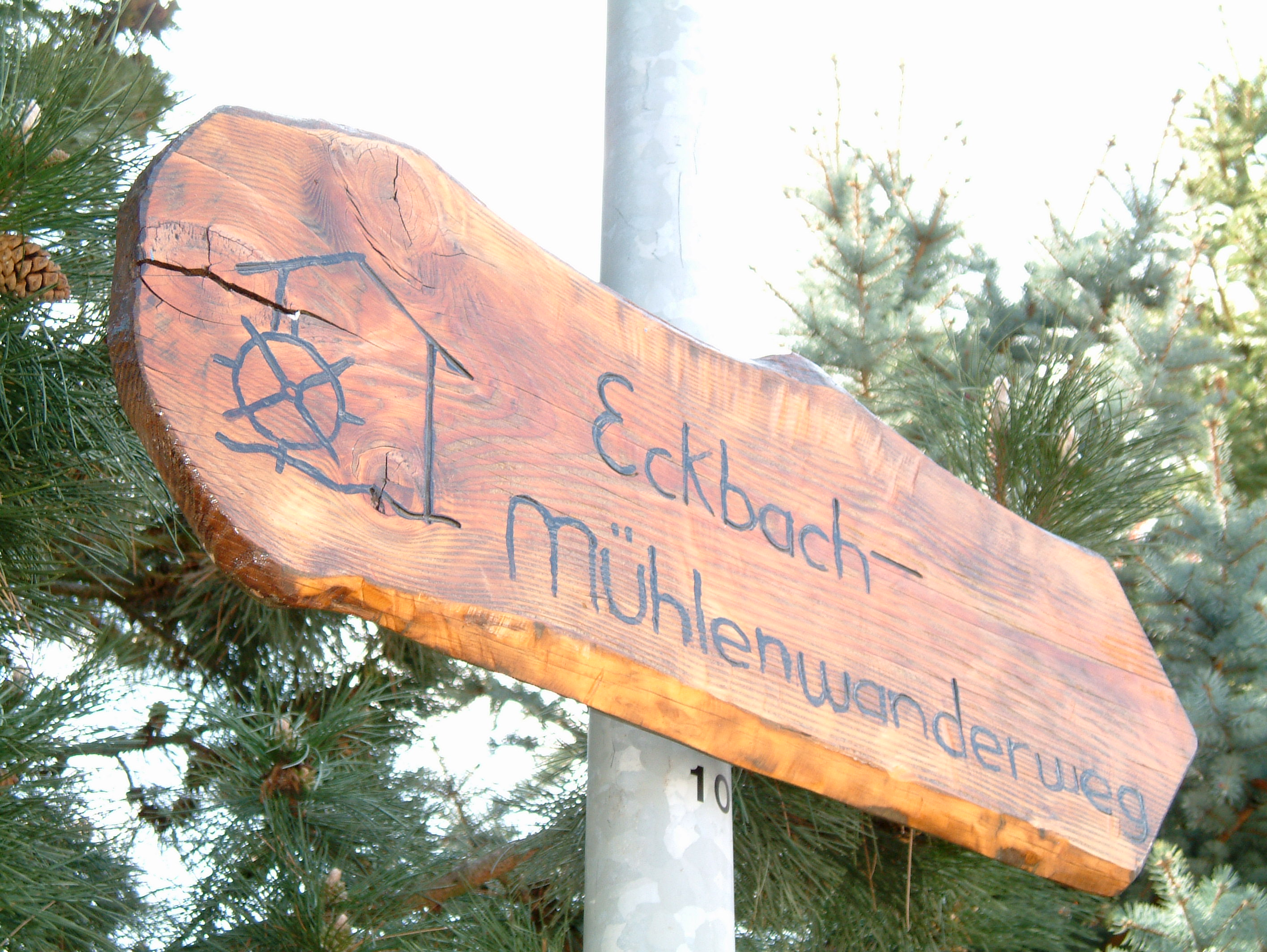
- Wooden signpost with logo and name
- Length: 23 km
- Location: Leiningerland (Palatinate, Rhineland-Palatinate)
- Trailheads: Hertlingshausen; 49°29′47.2″N 8°0′52.5″E; Dirmstein; 49°33′34.5″N 8°14′43″E
- Use: Hiking
- Elevation change: 200 m
- Highest point: 308 m
- Lowest point: 108 m
- Difficulty: easy
- Season: all-year round
- Waymark: wooden signposts with the logo
- Sights: 23 historic mills, mill museum, many other structural monuments

The Eckbach Mill Path (German: Eckbach-Mühlenwanderweg) is a footpath in the German state of Rhineland-Palatinate. It is 23 kilometres long and runs gently downhill along the Eckbach river through the Leiningerland in the northeast of the Palatinate region.

== Course ==
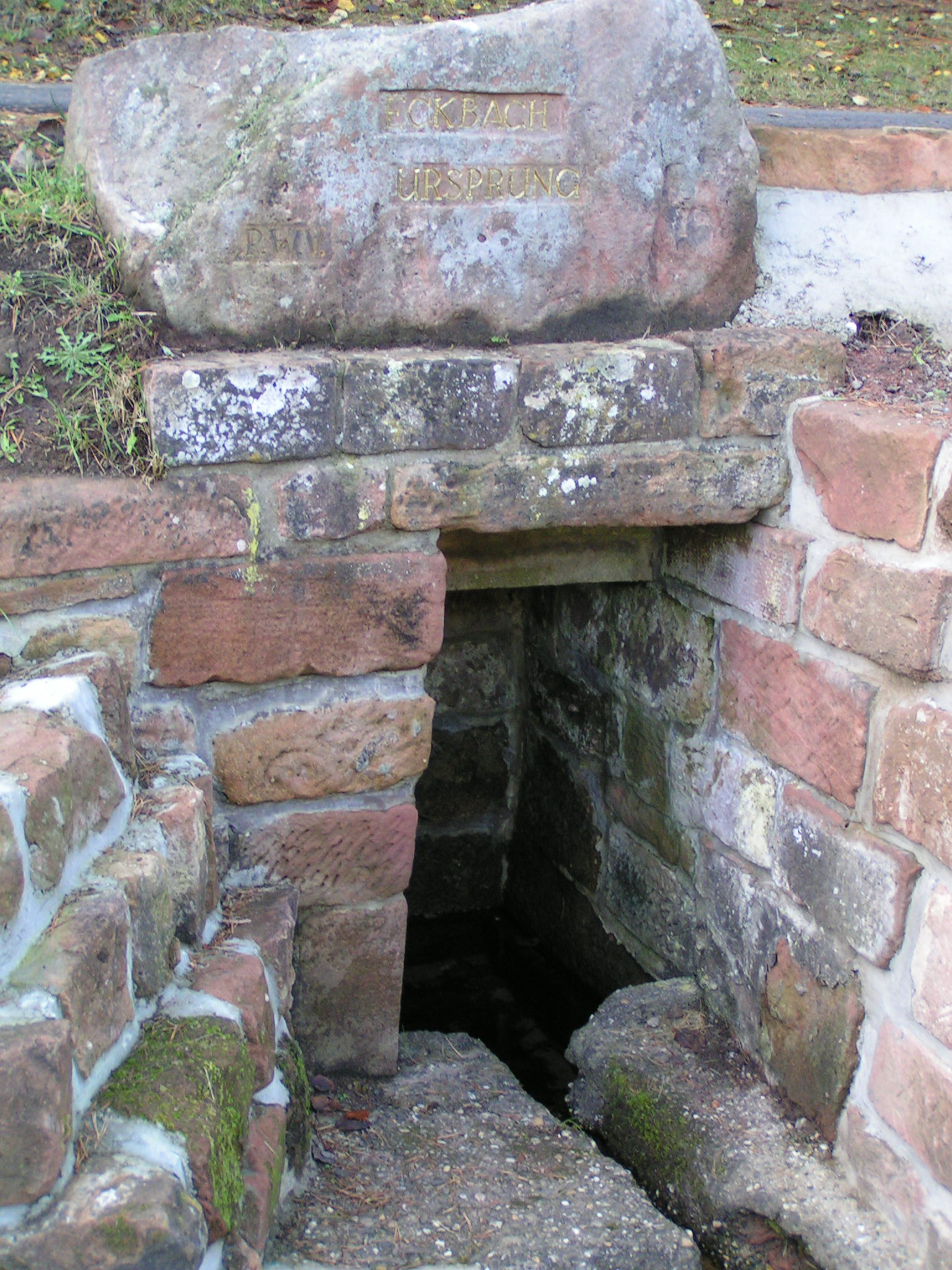
Western end: the source of the Eckbach with its Ritterstein (with the inscription Eckbach-Ursprung, "Eckbach source", above)

The trail runs from west to east/northeast through the collective municipalities of Hettenleidelheim and Grünstadt-Land. It links nine villages and 23 of the original 35 water mills, running from the Palatinate Forest through the vineyards along the German Wine Road to the edge of the Upper Rhine Plain. The height difference between the start and end points (Hertlingshausen 308 metres, Dirmstein 108 metres) is 200 metres, the cumulative gain and loss over the generally gently descending route is only 250 metres, hence its difficulty is assessed as easy.

The route, which is accessible all year round, is marked by wooden signposts, made and maintained by voluntary workers. They bear the mill logo and the name Eckbach-Mühlenwanderweg. The logo depicts a house and waterwheel above a wavy line and was designed by Cosmas Kösters from Kirchheim in a school competition. The wavy line symbolizes the Eckbach, the stylized house with a water wheel represents a mill.

== History ==
The path was created as a tourist attraction initiative of mill researcher, Wolfgang Niederhöfer, from Kleinkarlbach. On 12 October 1997 it was inaugurated by the minister president of Rhineland-Palatinate, Kurt Beck, in Großkarlbach, the village with the most surviving mills (six of seven). The suggestion made at the time to make the Großkarlbacher village mills a cultural monument and create the Leiningerland Mill Museum (Mühlenmuseum Leiningerland) was achieved in 2007.

Originally the route began by the Eckbachweiher pond and was only 19 kilometres long, but in 2000 it was extended by 4 kilometres upstream to the source of the Eckbach in Hertlingshausen.

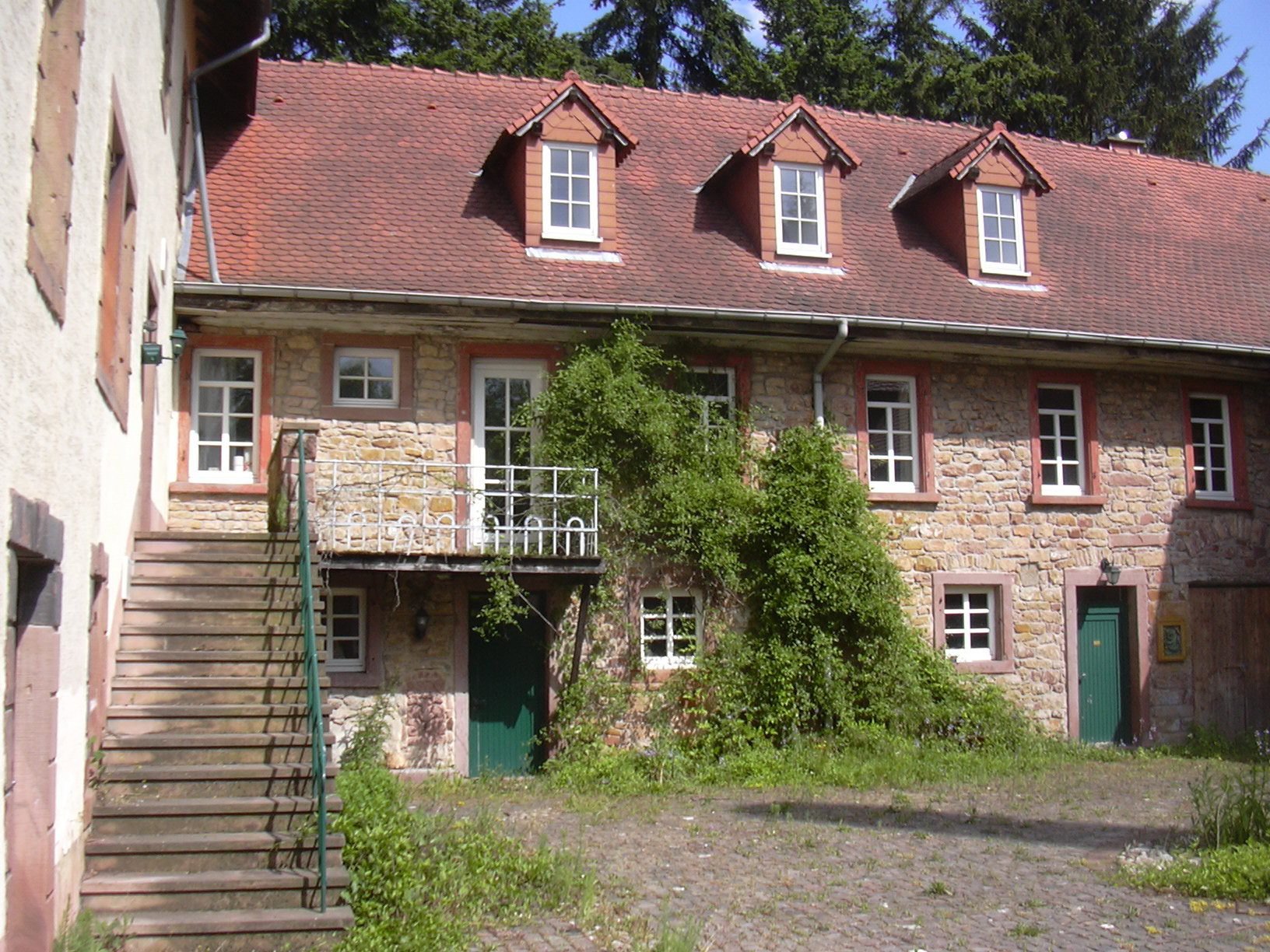
Rock mill in Neuleiningen-Tal

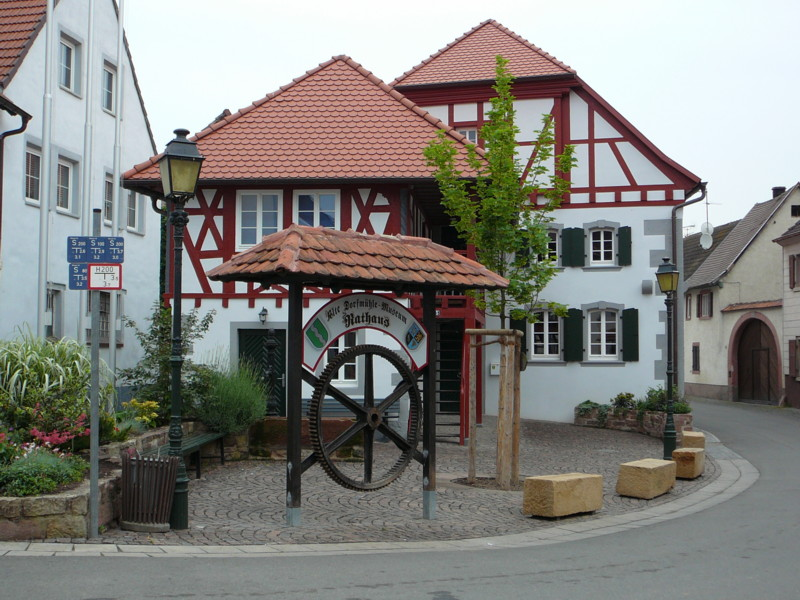
Village mills in Großkarlbach

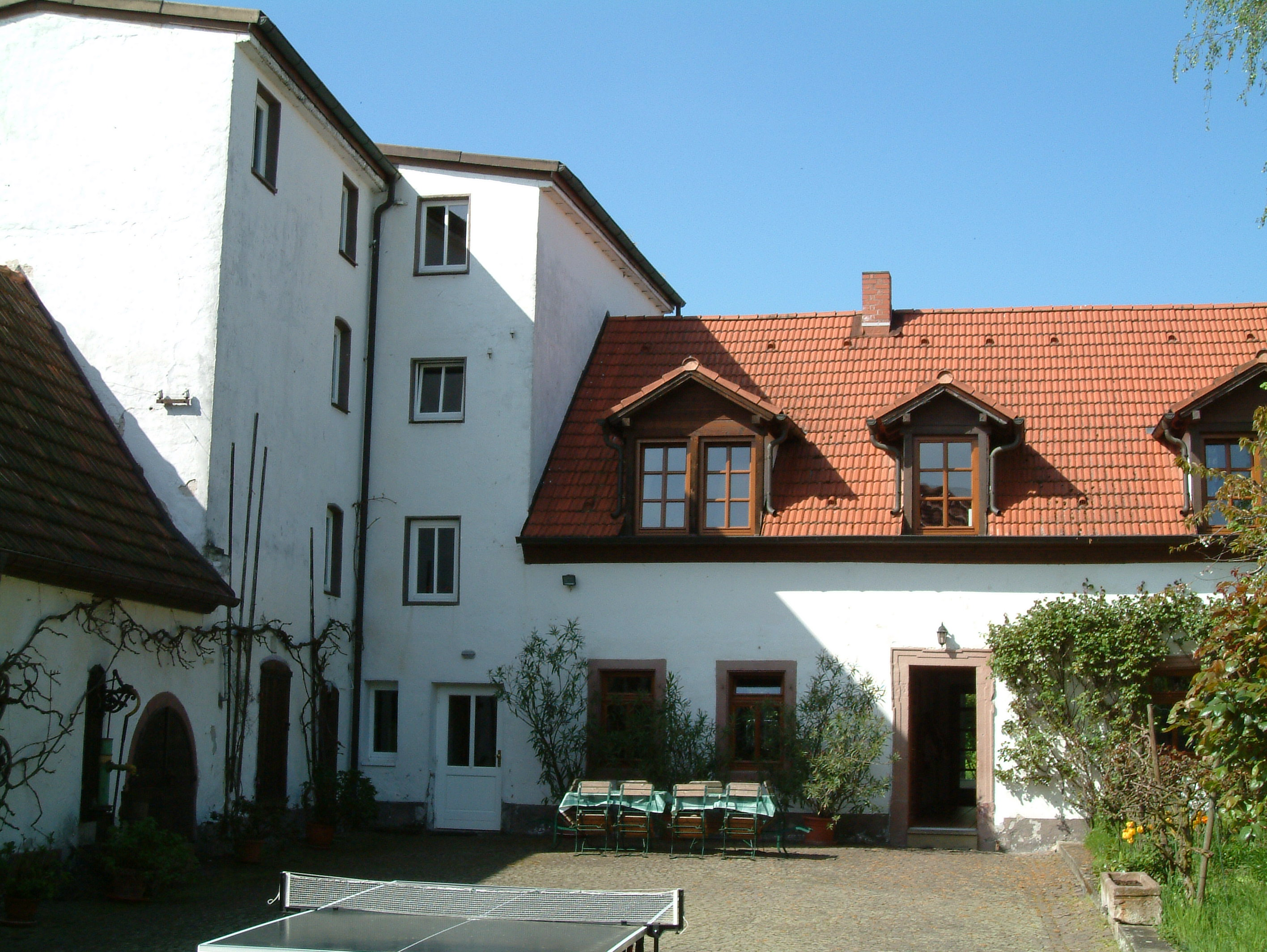
Eastern end of the route: The Spormühle in Dirmstein

== Places and mills ==
1. Hertlingshausen (Note: Point of interest: the source of the Eckbach in the parish of Kleinfrankreich)
2. Altleiningen (Note: Point of interest: the 20-Pipe Well which supplies the Eckbach)
3. Neuleiningen-Tal (Note: Point of interest: the Eckbachweiher pond)
  1. Obermühle ("Upper Mill")
  2. Felsenmühle (Note: Felsenmühle guest house and tourist inn) ("Rock Mill")
4. Kleinkarlbach
  3. Walkmühle ("Waulk Mill")
  4. Wiesenmühle ("Pastureland Mill")
  5. Bann- and Backmühle
  6. Strohmühle ("Straw Mill")
  7. Schleifmühle ("Grinding Mill")
  8. Langmühle ("Long Mill")
5. Kirchheim an der Weinstraße
  9. Kandelmühle or Oligmühle
  10. Eselsmühle ("Donkey Mill")
  11. Kochsche Mühle (locally known as the Gräfliche Leininger Mühle, "Leiningen Comital Mill")
6. Bissersheim
  12. Bruchmühle
  13. Haldmühle ("Mill in the Hollow")
  14. Bergmühle ("Hill Mill")
7. Großkarlbach
  15. Mühle am Weiher ("Mill by the Pond")
  16. Schlossmühle (Note: Frank’s Bodega disco since 2009)
  17. Rheinmühle ("Rhine Mill")
  18. Village mills (Note: Leiningerland Mill Museum (Mühlenmuseum Leiningerland) since 2007)
  19. Pappelmühle ("Poplar Mill")
  20. Heckmühle
8. Laumersheim
  21. Weidenmühle ("Meadow Mill")
  22. Hornungsmühle
9. Dirmstein (Note: The former Lower Mill was converted in the 19th century into a farmstead (Hofgut) which is now protected.)
  23. Spormühle (Note: Spormühle art gallery and country hotel)

Footnotes to the list:

== Literature ==
- Verbandsgemeinde Grünstadt-Land; Wolfgang Niederhöfer, eds. (1997), Einweihung des Mühlenwanderweges am 12.10.1997 : Festschrift (in German), Grünstadt und Kleinkarlbach
- Verbandsgemeinde Hettenleidelheim, ed. (2001), Das Wandern ist des Müllers Lust... auf dem Rad-, Kneipp- und Eckbach-Mühlenwanderweg (in German), Hettenleidelheim
