= Floßgraben =

Floßgraben means "rafting canal" in German. Rafting canals were used for log driving. Waterways that bear this name include:

- Alternative name of:
  - Batschke
  - Neugrabenflöße
  - Dlouhá stoka
- Floßgraben (Havel), flowing in and out of Tiefer Trebbower See
- Floßgraben (Leinacher Bach)
- Flößgraben (Leinakanal)
- Annaberger Floßgraben
- Lütsche-Flößgraben
- Schneeberger Floßgraben
- Elsterfloßgraben

== See also ==
- Floßbach (disambiguation)
