= Eckbach =

River in Germany

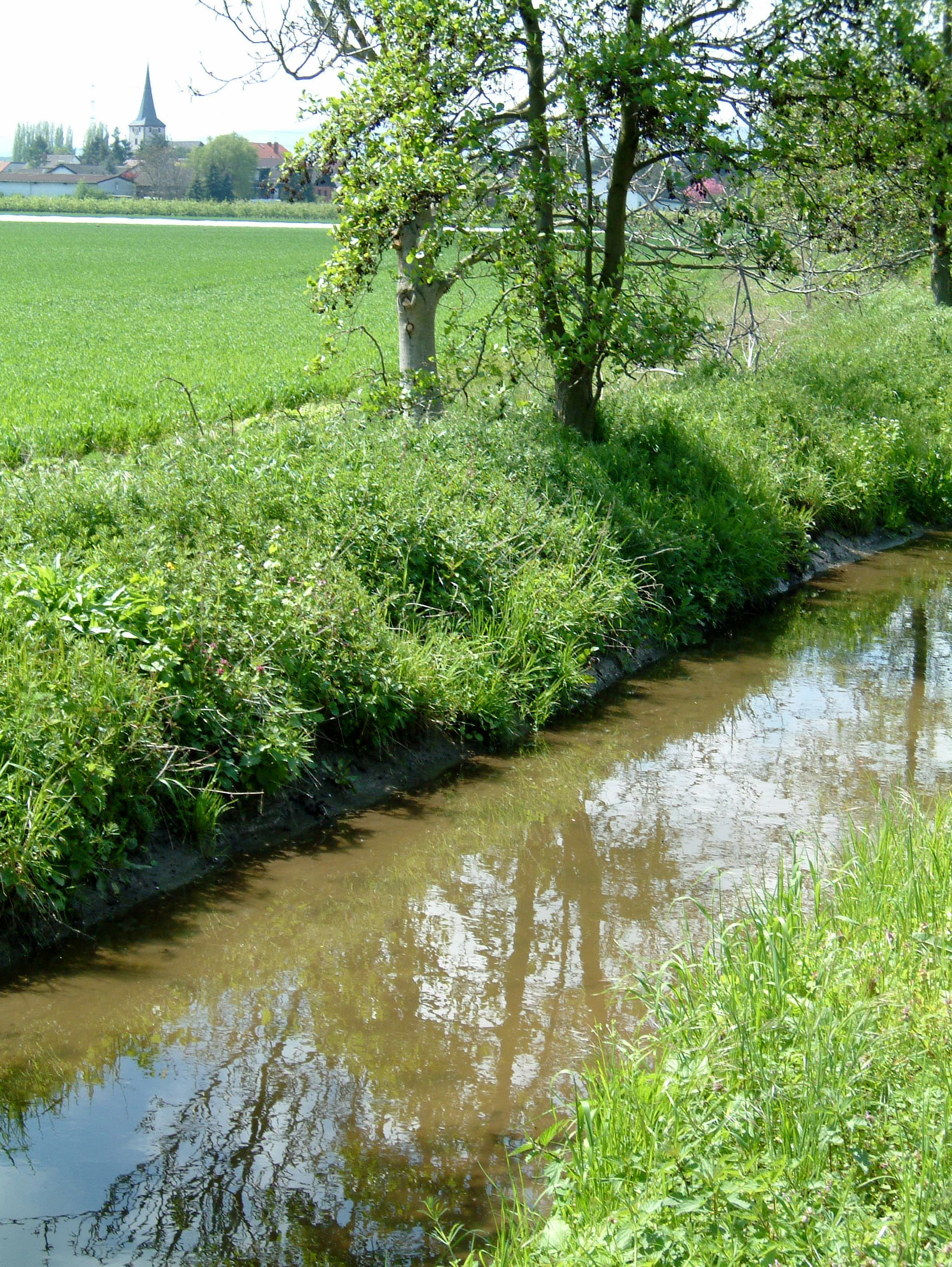
- Eckbach between Dirmstein and Laumersheim

Location
- Country: Germany
- State: Rhineland-Palatinate

Physical characteristics
- Source
  - location: near Carlsberg-Hertlingshausen,
  - coordinates: 49°29′46.67″N 8°0′52.02″E
  - elevation: 313 m (1,027 ft)
- Mouth
  - location: Confluence with Rhine at Worms,
  - coordinates: 49°36′30.45″N 8°24′6.68″E
  - elevation: 90 m (300 ft)
- Length: 39.27 km (24.40 mi)
- Basin size: 217.847 km^{2} (84.111 sq mi)

Basin features
- Progression: Rhine→ North Sea
- Tributaries
  - left: Rothbach, Floßbach
  - right: Höninger Bach, Schrakelbach

The Eckbach (locally known as the Eck and in the lower reaches also as Neugraben or Leiniger Graben) is a small river in the northeastern Palatinate and the southeastern Rhenish Hesse, Germany. It is slightly over 39 kilometres (24 mi) long.

== Name ==
Linguistic Research into the old name of die Eck shows that it is related to the Upper German word Ache, which means "river" or "creek" and is derived from the Old High German aha.

In the Middle Ages, the river was known as Leinbach. This name refers to the Leinbaum, that is, the Lime tree (Tilia × europaea L., not related to the Citrus aurantifolia, the tree that produces the lime (fruit)). In those days, both the Norway Maple (Acer platanoides) and the Large-leaved Linden (Tilia platyphyllos) were called Leinbaum in German. Both species were common on the banks of the Eckbach. One difference between the species is the shape of the leaves: maple leaves are five lobed, lime leaves are undivided. The coat of arms of the House of Leiningen shows a stylized tree with five-lobed leaves and five-pointed flowers clearly point to a maple. The House of Leiningen originated in the area around the upper Eckbach. It is entirely possible that they named their ancestral castle after the river. The family was later named after their castle and the area around the upper Eckbach is now called Leininger Land.

In the early 19th century, the local name of the river was Eck, as it is today. The Kingdom of Bavaria acquired the Palatinate in 1816. When Bavarian cartographers mapped the area, they were unaware of the meaning of the word Eck and wanted to make it clear that the "Eck" is a brook, so they recorded the name as Eckbach. Linguistically speaking, this name means "brook brook".

== Course ==
The Eckbach rises near Carlsberg in northern Palatinate Forest. The spring is framed in sandstone and is southeast of A6 (Saarbrücken-Mannheim) at an elevation of 313 metres (1,027 ft) above sea level in the Kleinfrankreich ("Little France") section of the Hertlingshausen district of Carlsberg. The spring is marked by a so-called Ritterstein.

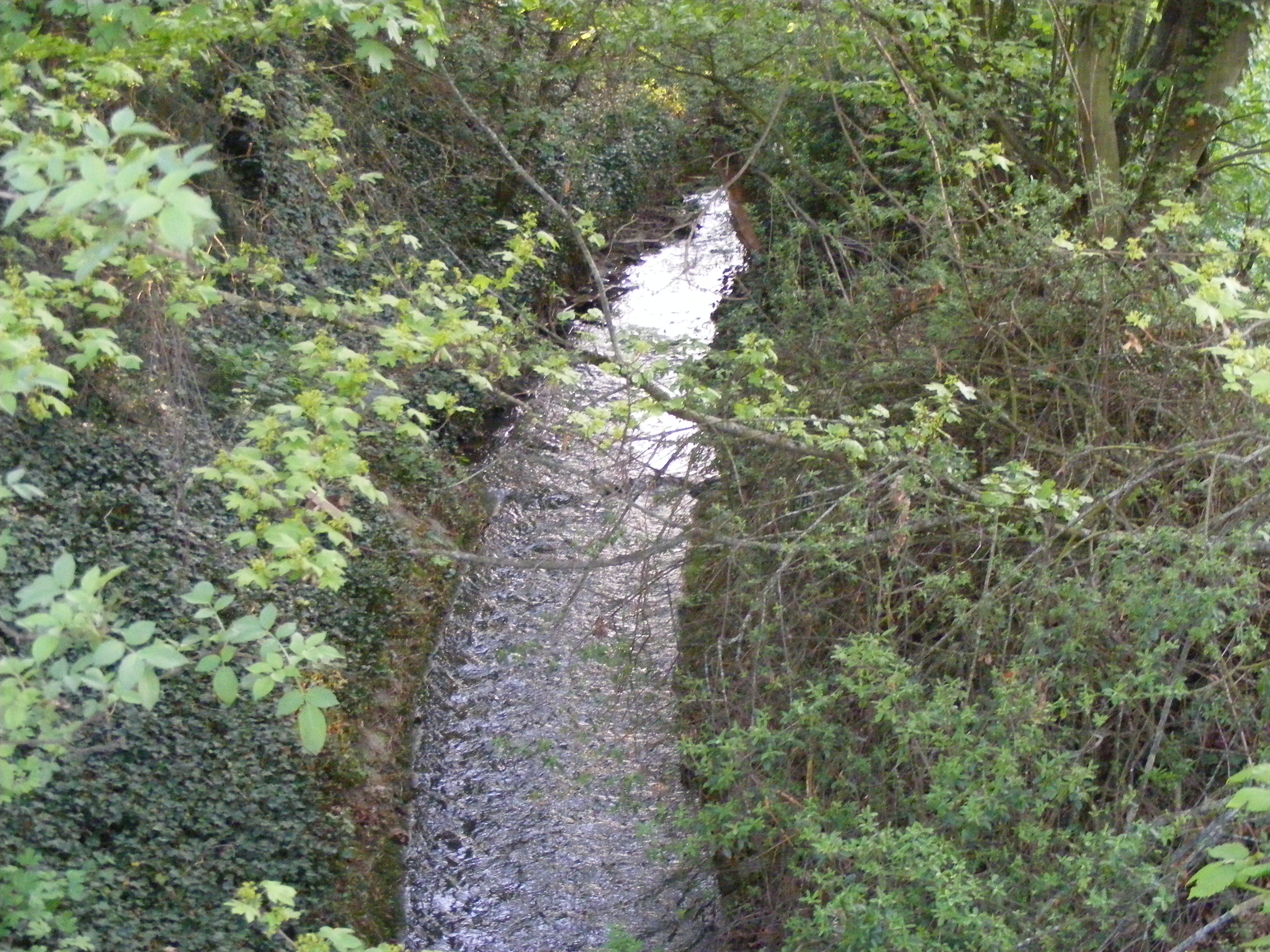
Eckbach in Kirchheim an der Weinstraße

The area surrounding the upper Eckbach is known as the Leininger Land or Leiningerland, after the aristocratic Leiningen family who ruled the area in the High Middle Ages. The Eckbach is the central watercourse in this area. This part of the river is managed by the Gewässer-Zweckverband Isenach-Eckbach, a division of the county of Bad Dürkheim. The river initially flows in an easterly direction through Hertlingshausen, then northeast through Altleiningen, where it receives water from the artificial 20-Pipe Well (20-Röhren-Brunnen). In the northeastern outskirts of Altleiningen, the Eckbach takes up the 4-kilometre (2.5 mi) long Rothbach from the left, then the 5-kilometre (3 mi) long Höninger Bach from the right.

After flowing through the Eckbachweiher reservoir at Neuleiningen-Tal, the Eckbach breaks through the eastern edge of the Palatinate Forest, the Haardt, between the village of Battenberg on the south bank and Neuleiningen on the north bank. It reaches the vineyard-covered hills around the German Wine Route at Kleinkarlbach. In Kirchheim an der Weinstrasse, the Eckbach, now flowing eastward, passes under the north-south running B271 highway, before flowing through Bissersheim. From there, the Eckbach flows in a northeasterly direction to Großkarlbach, where it crosses the A6 motorway before flowing through Laumersheim.

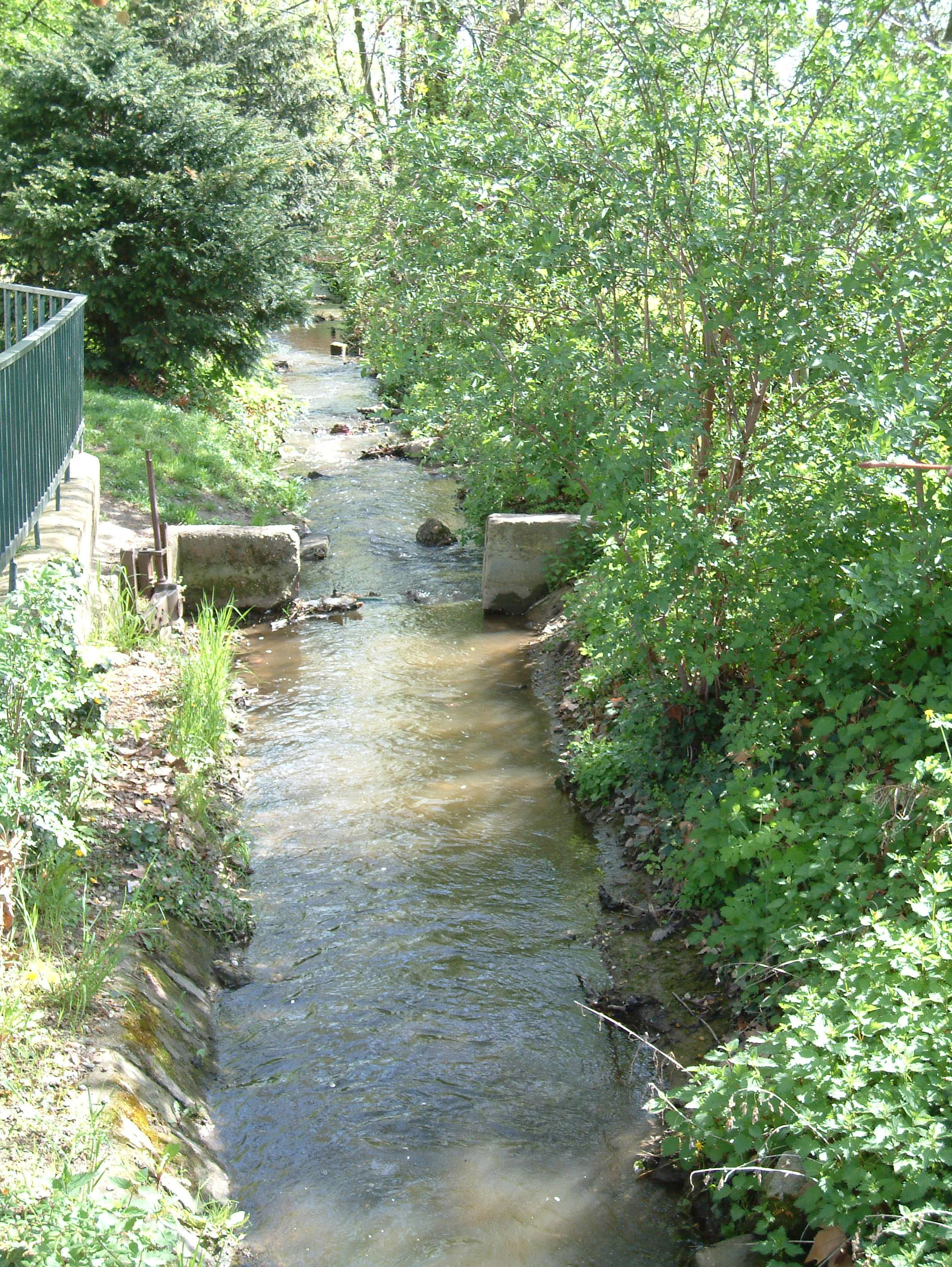
Eckbach in Dirmstein

In Dirmstein, the Eckbach collects the 8-kilometre (5 mi) long Floßbach, locally known as the Landgraben, which is the Eckbach's largest tributary. To the left, that is, to the north of the Eckbach, the structure of the hills is clearly defined. There is a long, low ridge with three summits marking the divide between the Eisbach and the Eckbach: the Wörschberg, elevation 163 metres (535 ft), north of the road connecting Obersülzen and Dirmstein, the Schneckenberg, elevation 143 metres (469 ft), between Dirmstein and Offstein and the Stahlberg, elevation 134 metres (440 ft), between Dirmstein and the Heppenheim district of Worms.

The area south and to the right or the Eckbach is flatter and the Großkarlbach-Laumersheim-Dirmstein-Gerolsheim area used to be a boggy lowland, which was used as pasture land. Further south lies the divide between the Eckbach and its southern neighbour, the Fuchsbach. This was a left tributary of the Isenach until the second half of the 20th century, when most of its water was diverted into Schrakelbach. The area between Laumersheim, Dirmstein, Gerolsheim and Heuchelheim contains a number of irrigation canals: Weihergraben, Altbach, Kühweidegraben, Altgraben, Bittinggraben and Lerchengraben. These ditches begin as distributaries of the Eckbach and return to the Eckbach 4 to 8 kilometres (2.5 to 5.0 mi) downstream, some of them directly into Eckbach, some flow into Schrakelbach. East of Heuchelheim and to the north of the Frankenthal Interchange, the A61 crosses the Eckbach.

The Eckbach then flows past Beindersheim. Just north of Beindersheim, it accepts from the right the Schrakelbach, which contains water from the Fuchsbach and from some of the irrigation canals mentioned earlier. The Eckbach the flows through the western part of the Upper Rhine Plain, flowing north-northeast past the villages Großniedesheim and Kleinniedesheim. It continues northeast through Bobenheim, which is the northern part of Bobenheim-Roxheim. The next section is called Neugraben ("New Ditch") and flows due north. Southeast of Worms Airport, the Eckbach swings east.

The river then flows into the Wormser Ried nature reserve. It crosses the municipal border into Worms, where it is known as Leininger Graben. The last bridge across the Eckbach carries the B9. It flows past the recreational area Bürgerweide on the southern side, then into the Upper Rhine at an elevation of 90 metres (300 ft).

== History ==
Leiningen family coat of arms depicting a stylised tree that represents a lime

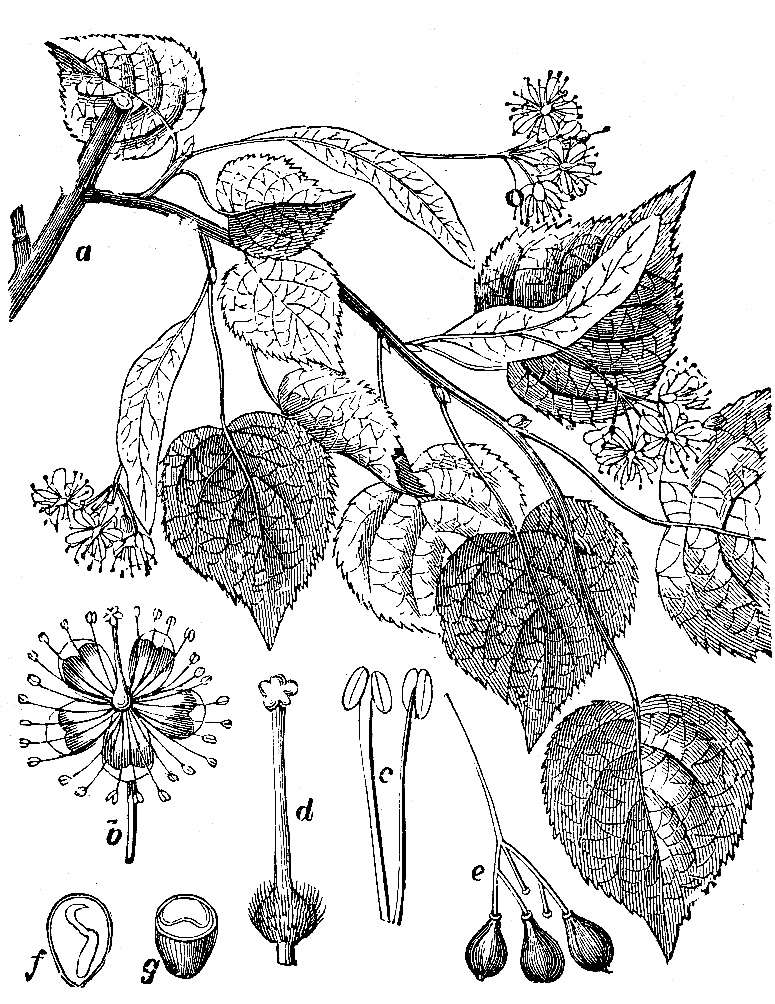
Large-leaved lime: undivided lamina; five-petalled flower

The old name of the river, the Eck is thought by linguistic experts to be derived from the word Ache, commonly used in the Upper German dialects of South Germany to mean "river" or "stream", which in turn came from the Old High German word aha.

In the Middle Ages the Eckbach bore the name Leinbach, which is where its association with the lime tree arose. Leinbaum is the local word for both the large-leaved lime and the Norway maple; two species of tree that used to be very common on the banks of the Eckbach. They differ, however, especially in terms of the leaf shape: maple leaves have five lobes; lime leaves are undivided. The Leiningen family coat of arms of displays a stylised tree, whose leaves - and its five-petalled flowers – are clearly those of a lime. The noble family of Leiningen who came from the region of the upper Eckbach were permitted to name their family castle after the old name for the stream; from which in turn the subsequent name of the family was derived.

The fact that the stream, originally called the Eck, now bears the name Eckbach goes back to the Kingdom of Bavaria, which was granted that part of the Palatinate west of the Rhine in 1816. When Bavarian officials surveyed the Palatine cartographically they changed the name, in ignorance of the name's origin, in order to make clear that the Eck was a river (otherwise the word Eck or Ecke in German means "corner"). The result is that the present name of Eckbach linguistically means "stream stream".

== Nature ==
Increasing abandonment of agricultural land in the area around the Eckbach and measures land restoration measures have enabled the return or colonisation of rare plant and animal species. In the early winter of 2012 great egrets were seen on the Eckbach near Dirmstein, a bird whose native habitat is actually further south and east.

== Sights ==
=== Castles ===
On the heights of the Palatine Forest and Haardt mountains above the Eckbach valley lies the castles of Altleiningen, Neuleiningen and Battenberg. Since 1980, stage productions by the Altleiningen Castle Players (Burgspiele Altleiningen) have taken place during the summer months.

=== Blitzröhren ===
The so-called Blitzröhren ("lightning pipes") on one of the roads leading to Battenberg are a natural monument. People used to think they were caused by lightning strikes, but they are now thought to be a result of geochemical action.

=== Leiningen Valley Railway ===
A section of the Leiningen Valley Railway used to run along the Eckbach for about 6 kilometres (4 mi) between Kleinkarlbach and Altleiningen carrying both passengers and goods.

=== Eckbach Mill Path ===
In 1997 the Eckbach Mill Path was established alongside the Eckbach. Initially it only ran through seven villages that were part of the Grünstadt-Land collective municipality. Subsequently it has been extended as far as the source of the Eckbach near Hertlingshausen (Hettenleidelheim) giving it a total length of 23 kilometres (14 mi).

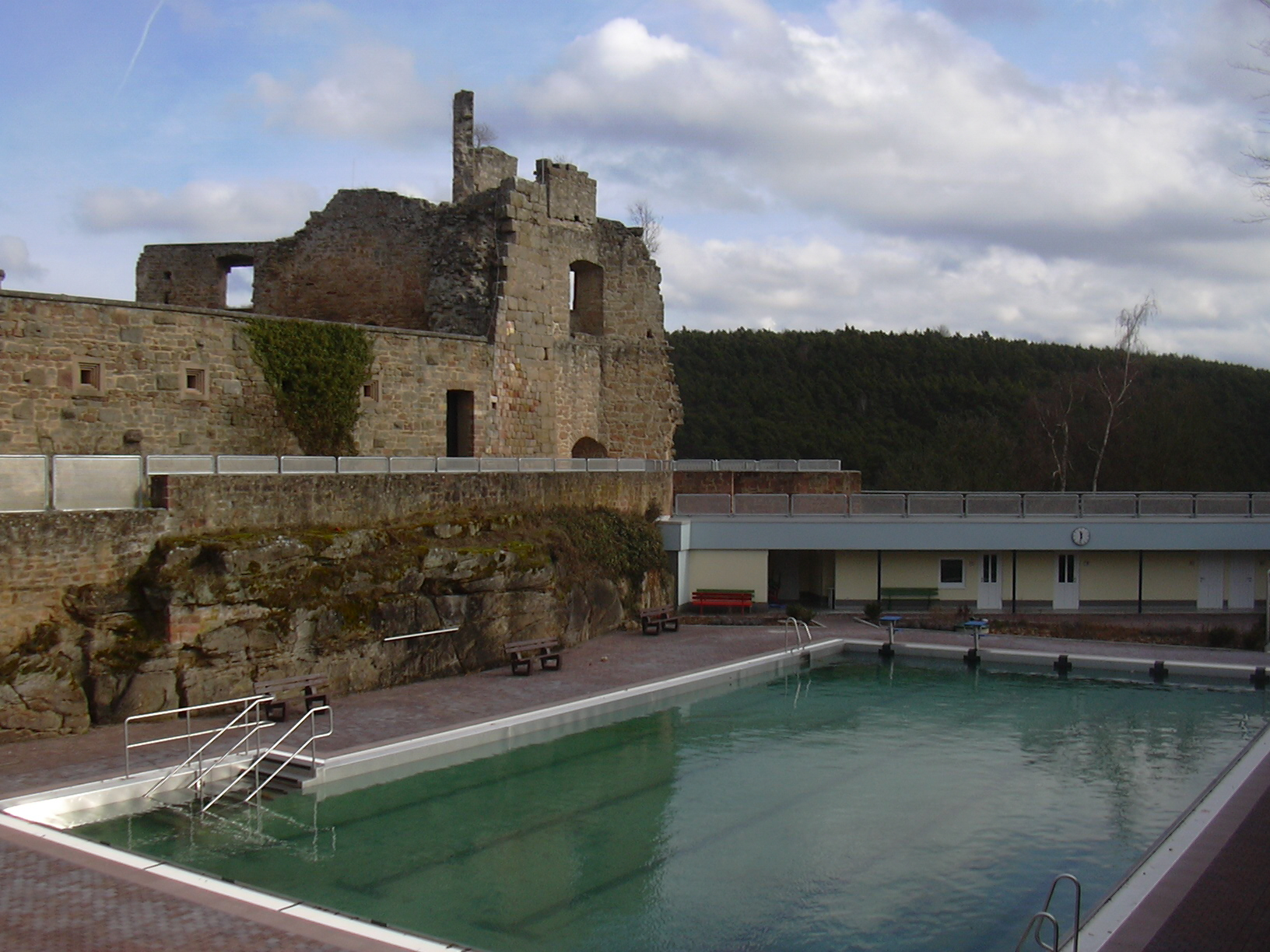
Altleiningen Castle: lido in the moat

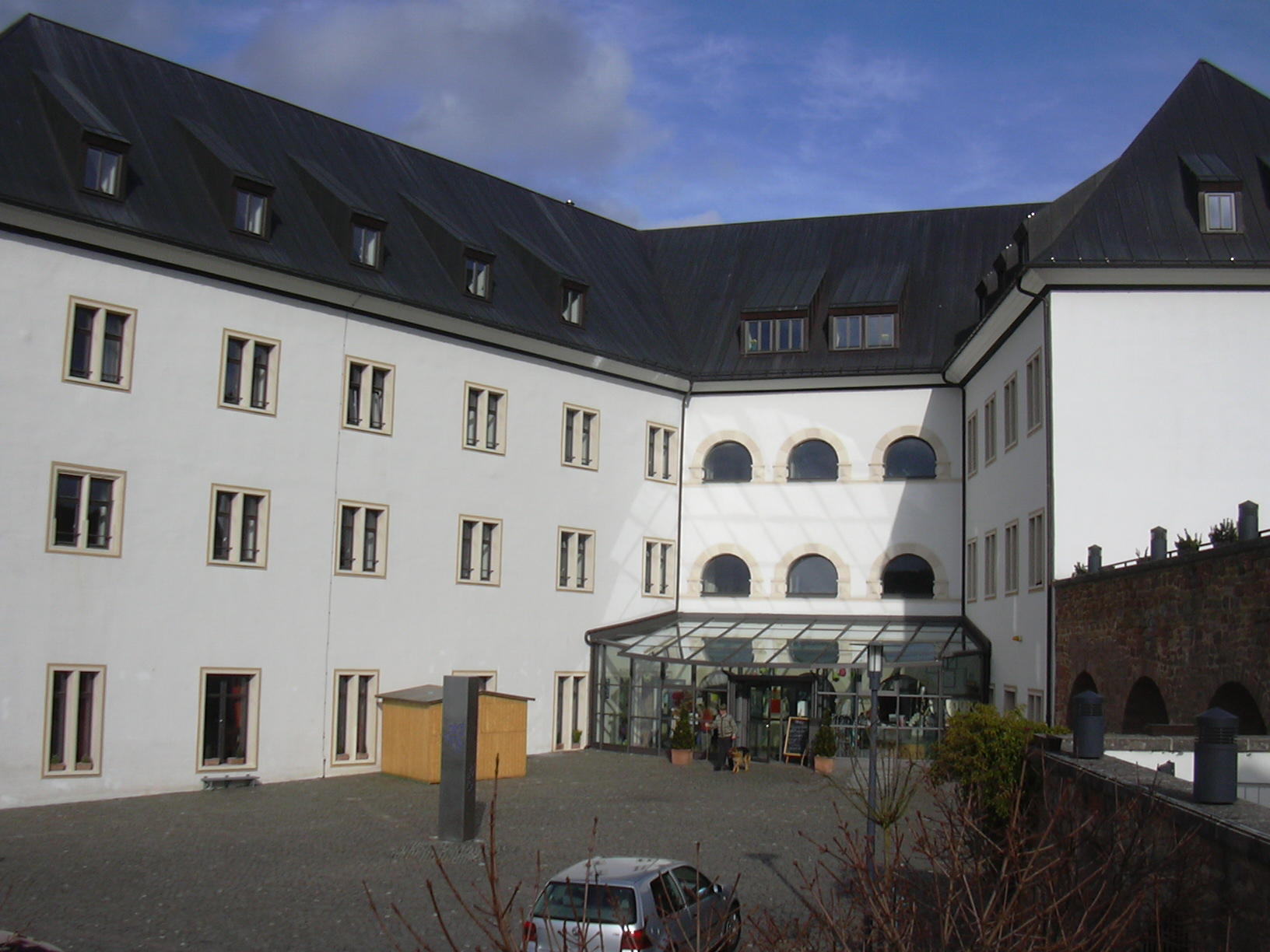
Altleiningen Castle: youth hostel

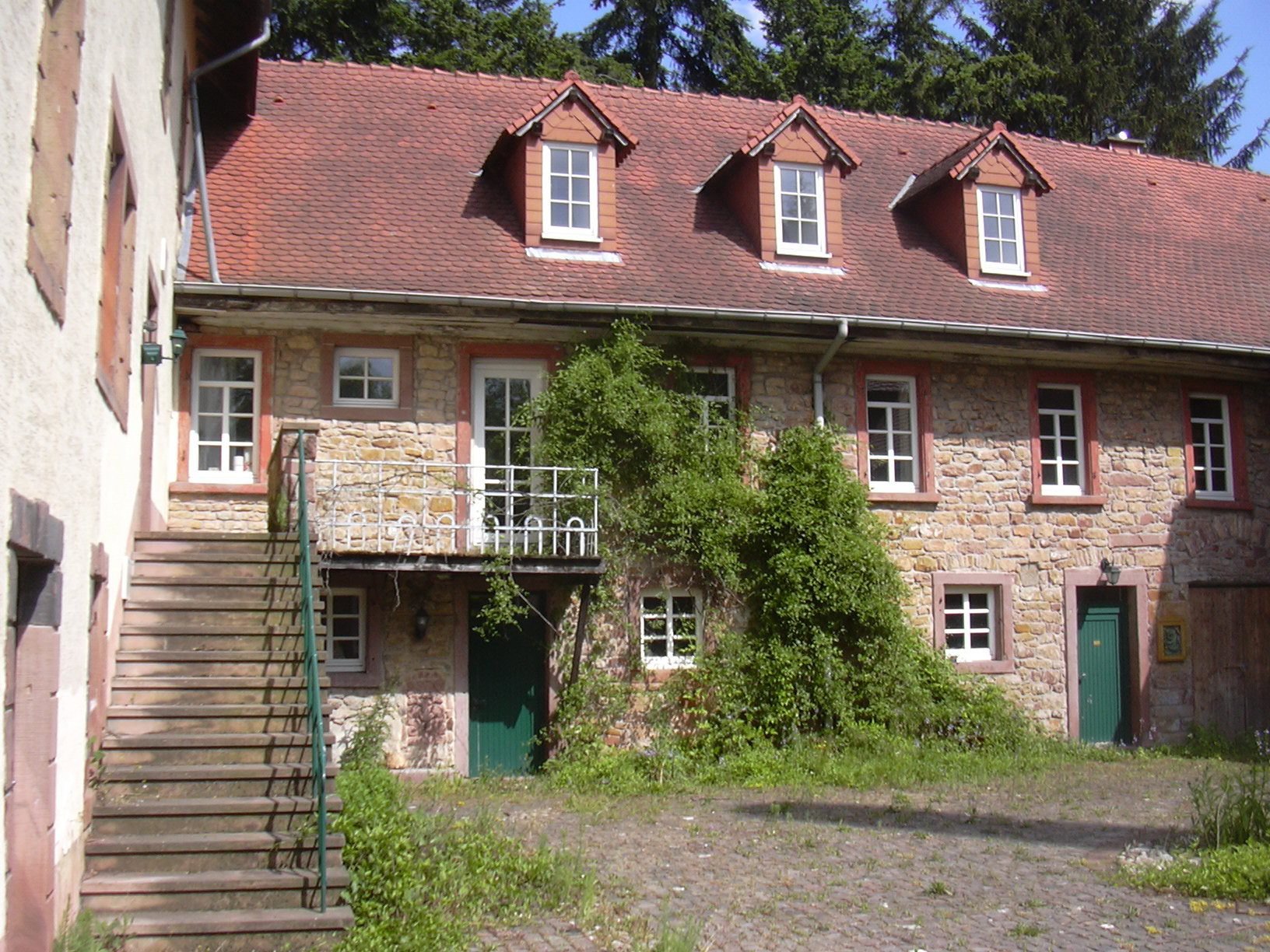
Felsenmühle mill, Neuleiningen valley

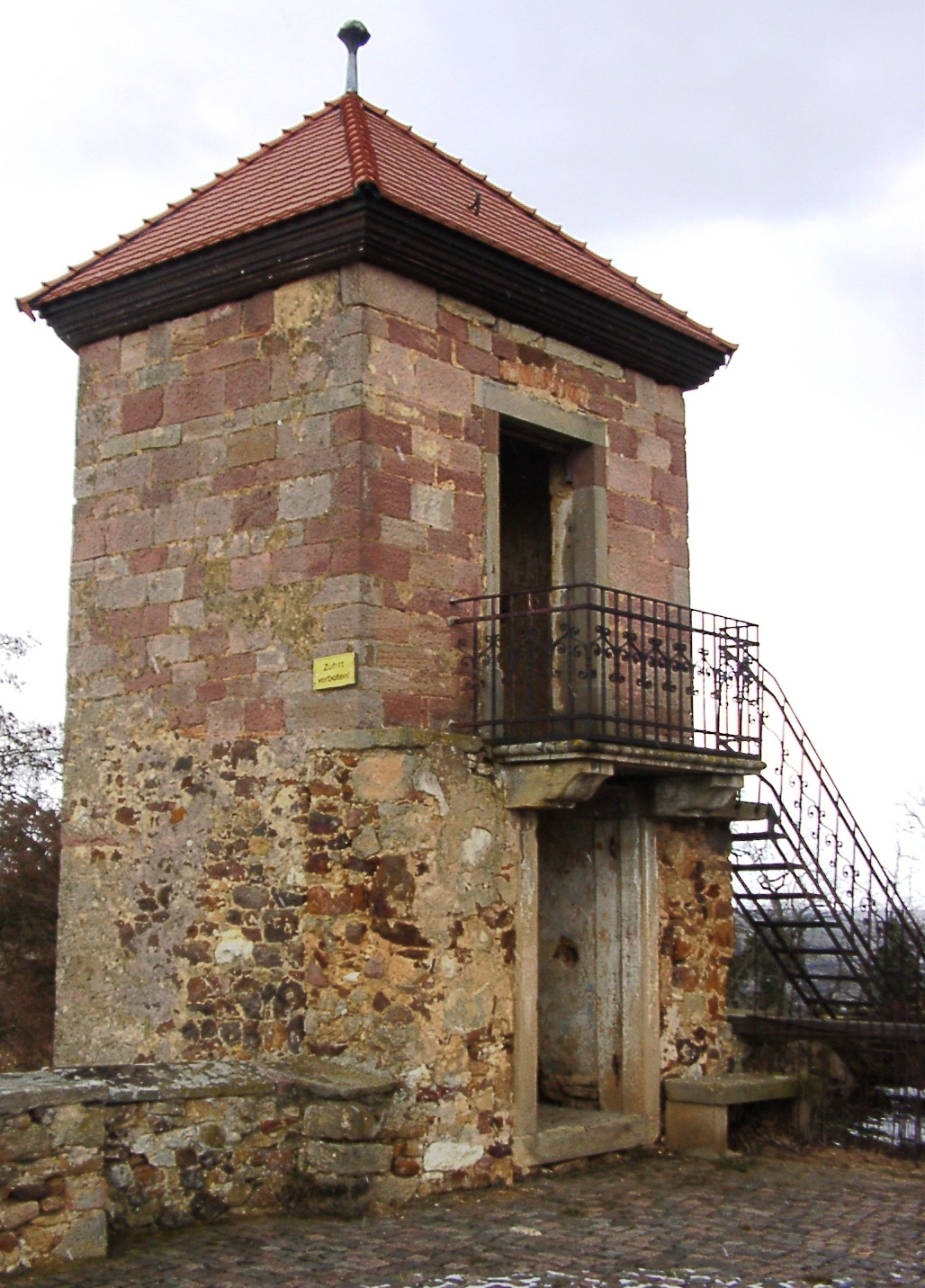
Battenberg Castle: tower

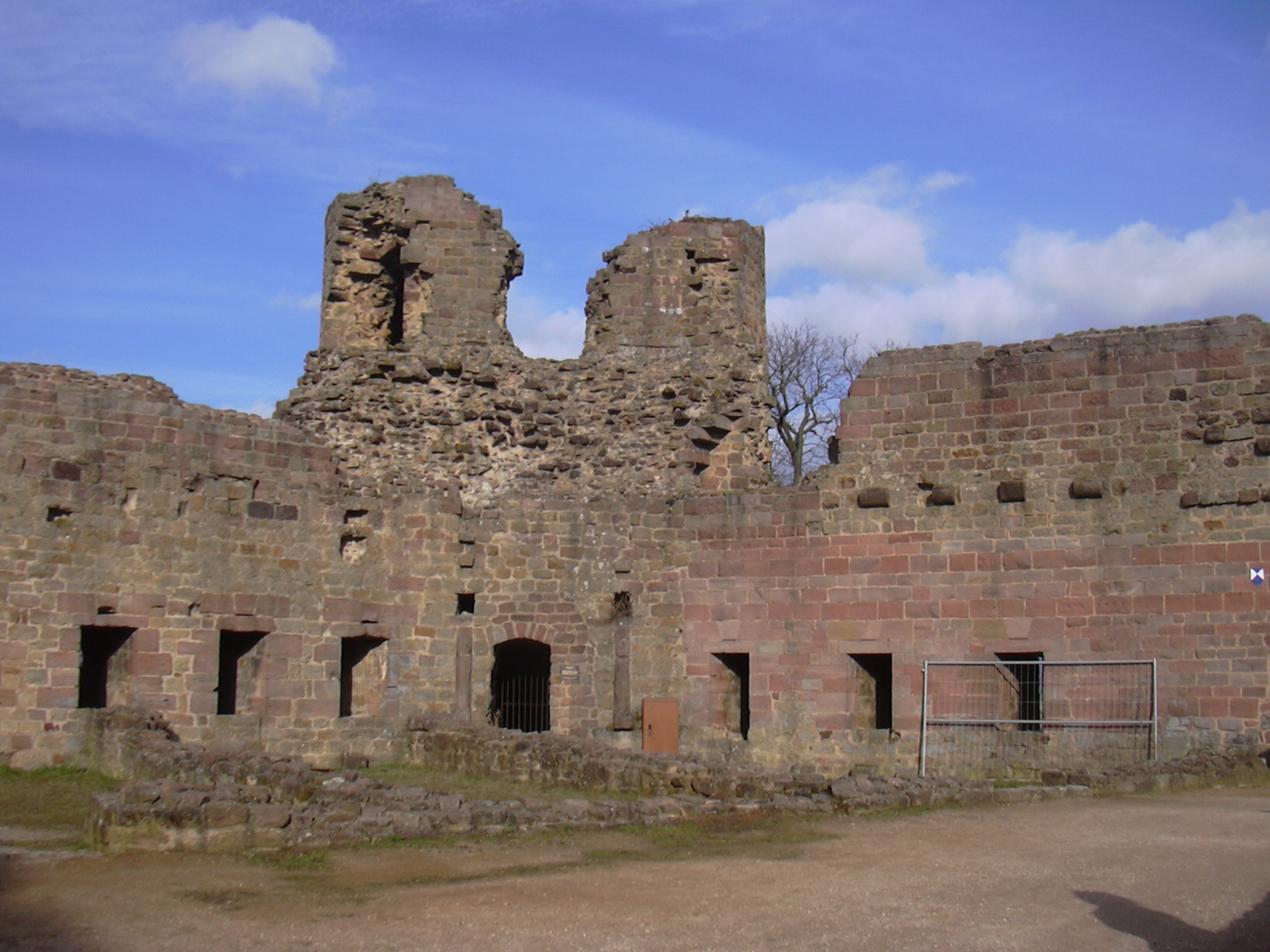
Neuleiningen Castle: ruins of the palas and bergfried

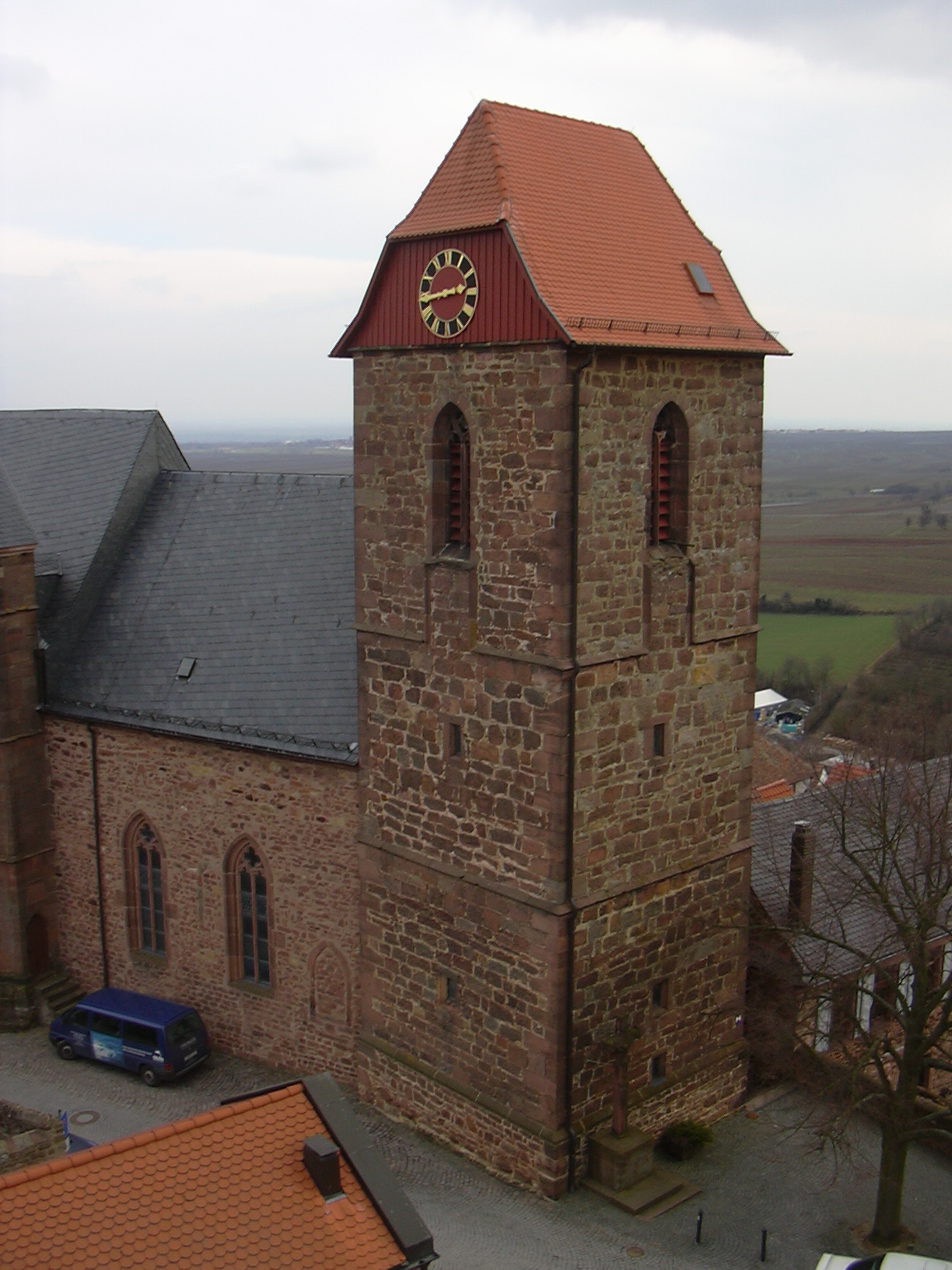
Neuleiningen Castle: the old castle chapel

=== 20-Pipe Well ===
Today the Eckbach receives most of its water from the 20-Pipe Well in Altleiningen. The well is fed by water from an adit that was driven deep into the rock around 1600 in order to supply the castle above. The actual source of the Eckbach is 5 kilometres (3 mi) upstream, but this no longer delivers water all year round due to the lowering of the groundwater level.

=== Eckbachweiher ===
The Eckbach is impounded in the area of Neuleiningen-Tal to form the Eckbachweiher. In the past the section from here to Dirmstein had 35 water mills, of which 23 have more or less survived; and some of which have been restored.

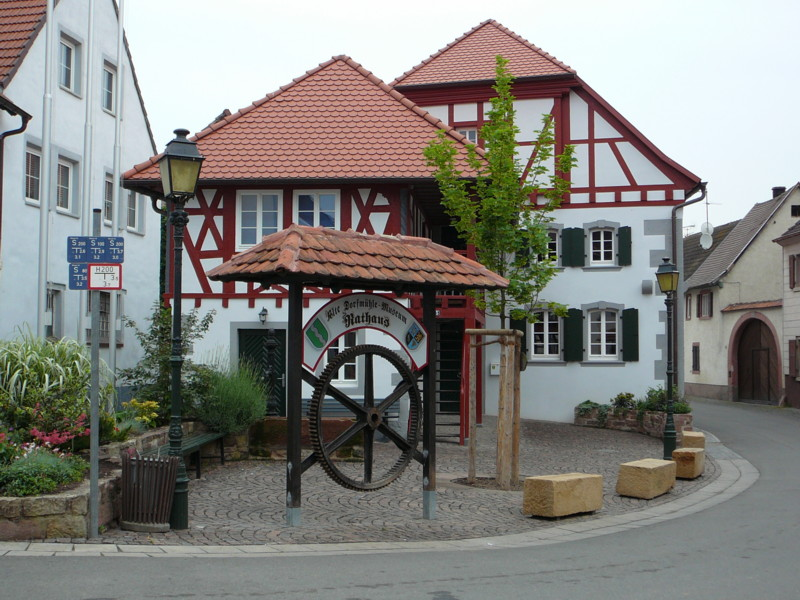
Village mill and mill museum, Großkarlbach

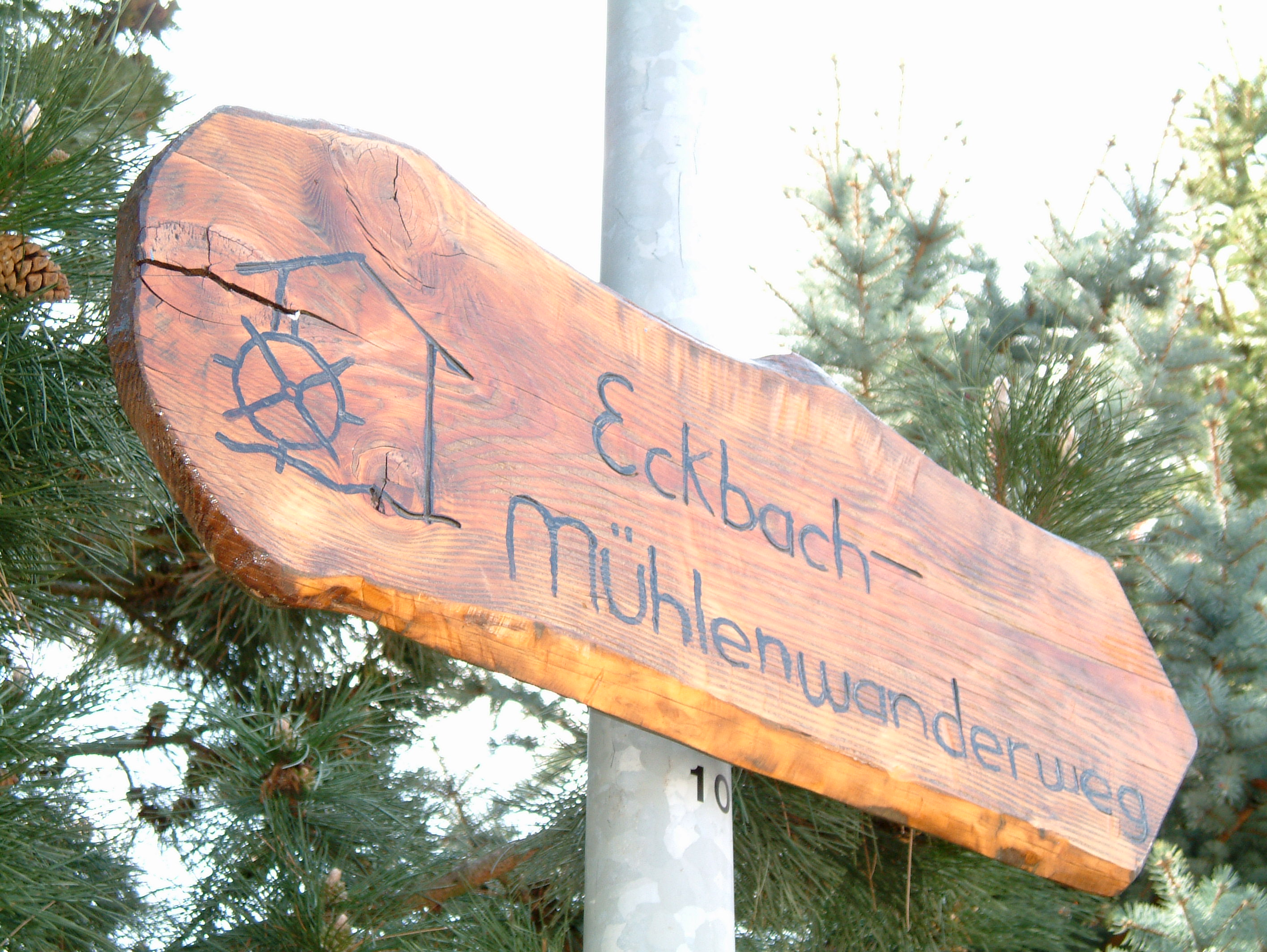
Handmade waymarks on the Mill Path

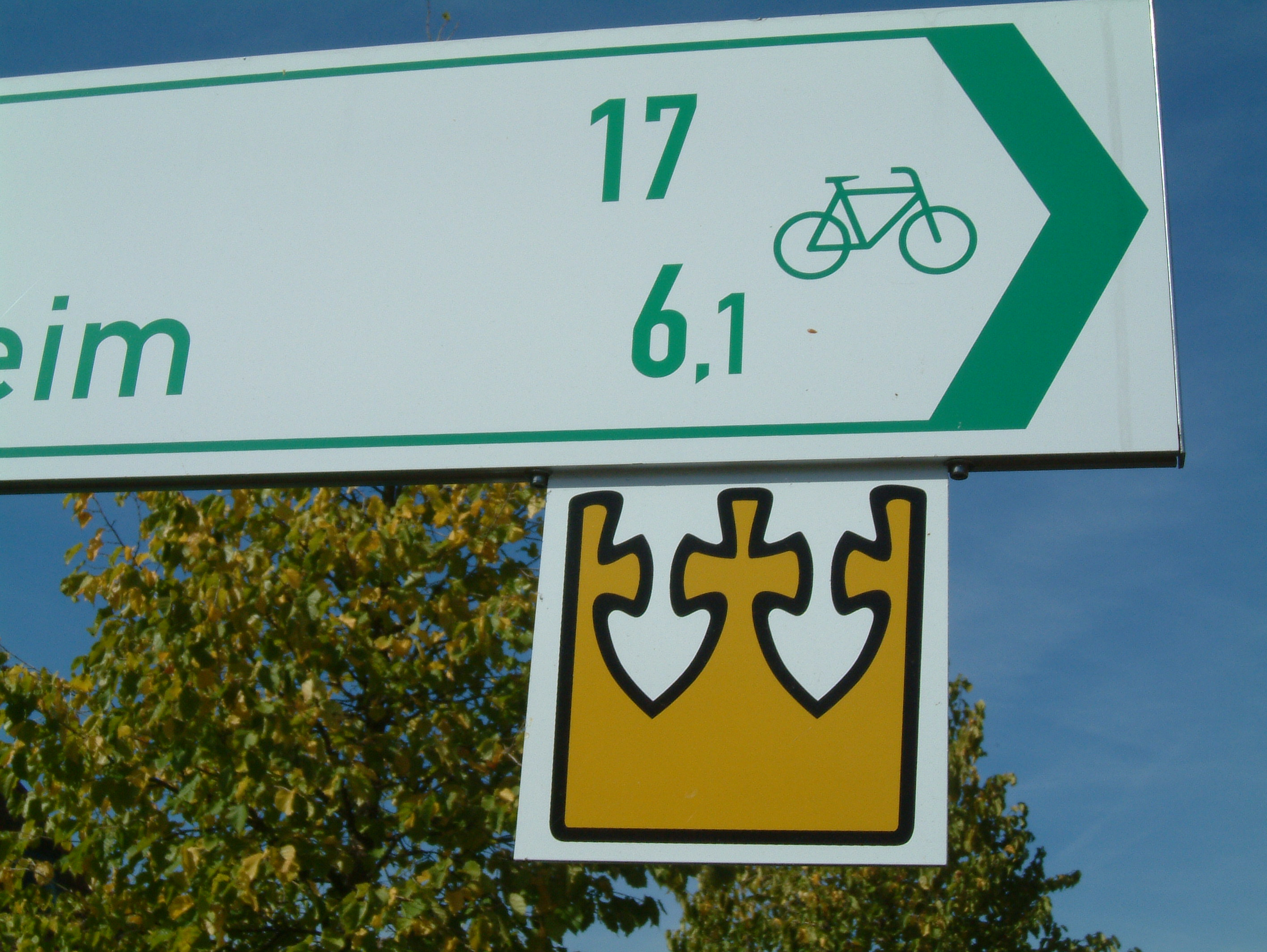
Salian Cycleway

=== Mills ===
In 2007 the Leiningerland Mill Museum was opened in the Großkarlbacher village mill, a building that dates to the Middle Ages. Other mills worth visiting are the Felsenmühle, operated as a hotel-restaurant in Neuleiningen-Tal and the Spormühle in Dirmstein, today a country hotel with an art gallery. The old Niedermühle mill in Dirmstein was converted in the 19th century into a manor farm.

=== St Lawrence's Church, Dirmstein ===
St Lawrence's Church in Dirmstein is a small jewel of baroque architecture that was built from 1742 to 1746 to plans by church architect, Balthasar Neumann, and local builder, Franz Rothermel. The Eckbach, which used to flow just 50 metres (160 ft) south of the church, was re-routed in the 1920s to the southern edge of the village.

=== Salian Cycleway ===
Since 2007 the Salian Cycleway, which links buildings and structures of the Salian dynastic period, has crossed the Eckbach Mill Path in Dirmstein.

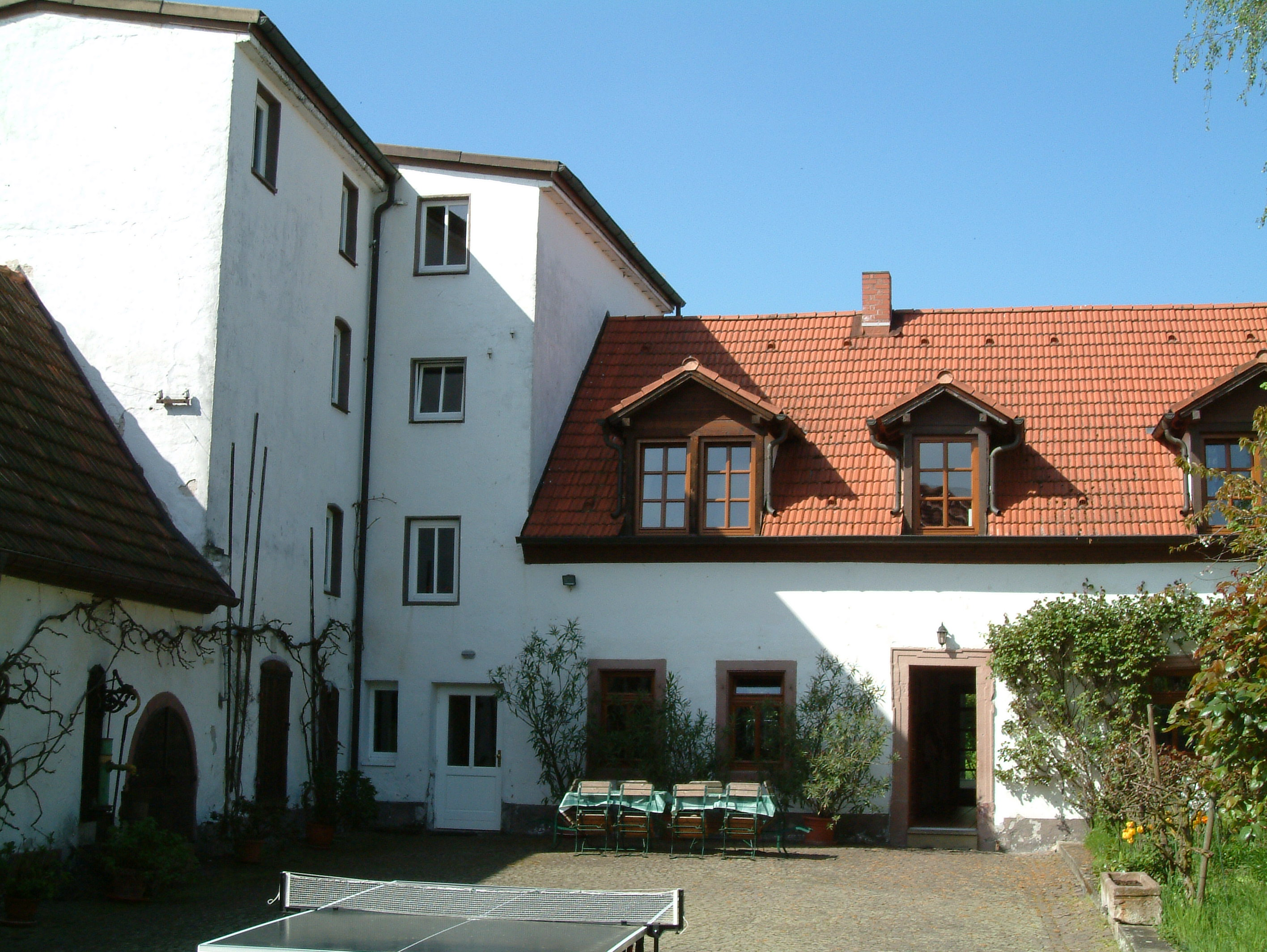
The Spormühle mill, Dirmstein

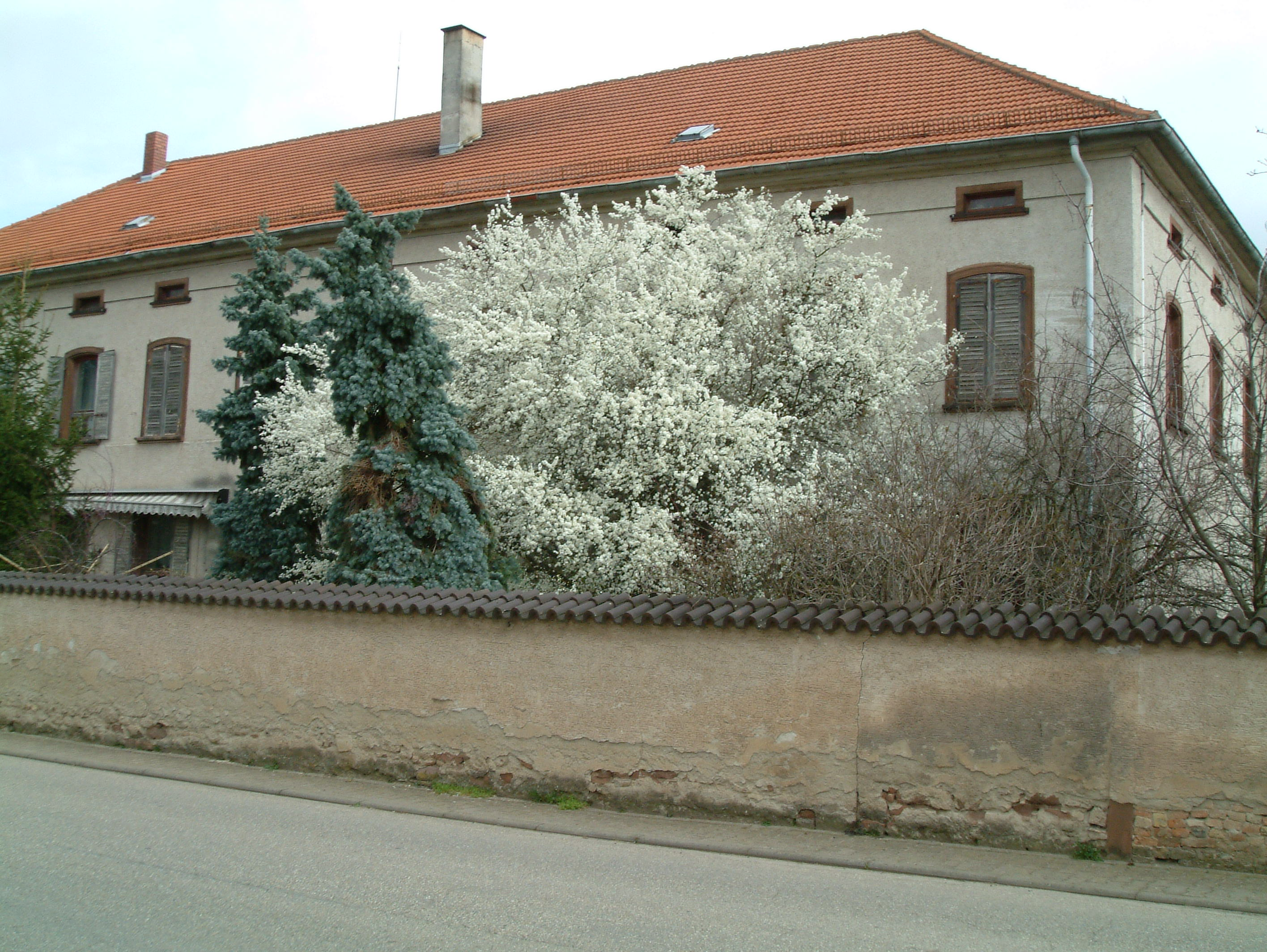
The old Niedermühle mill, Dirmstein

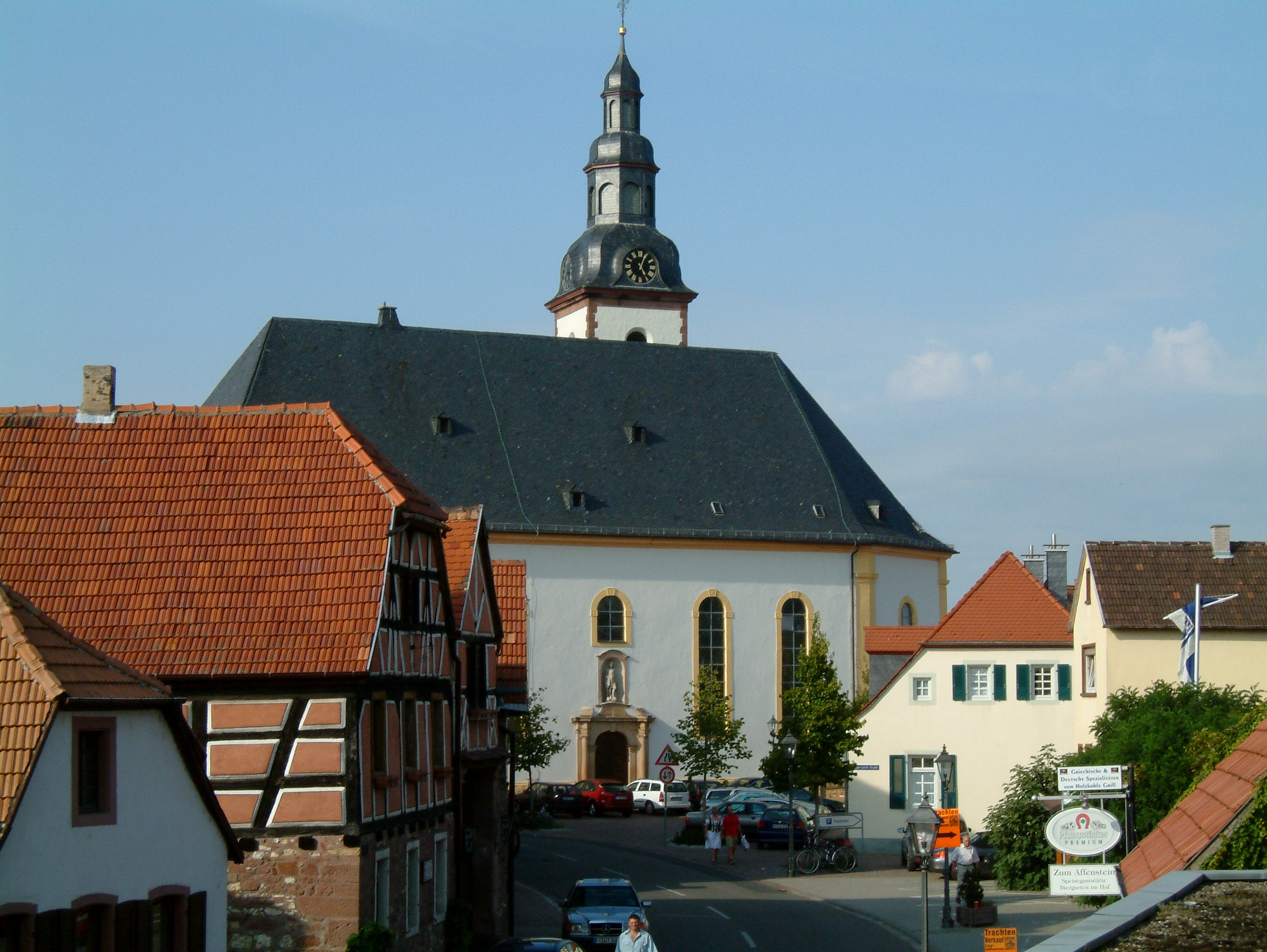
St. Lawrence's, Dirmstein

=== Renovated village centres ===
The general appearance of most of the villages, especially in Neuleiningen, Großkarlbach and Dirmstein, is characterized by their renovated centres, some of which still date to the Middle Ages, but most of which date to the baroque period.

== See also ==
- List of rivers of Rhineland-Palatinate
