= Floßbach (Eckbach) =

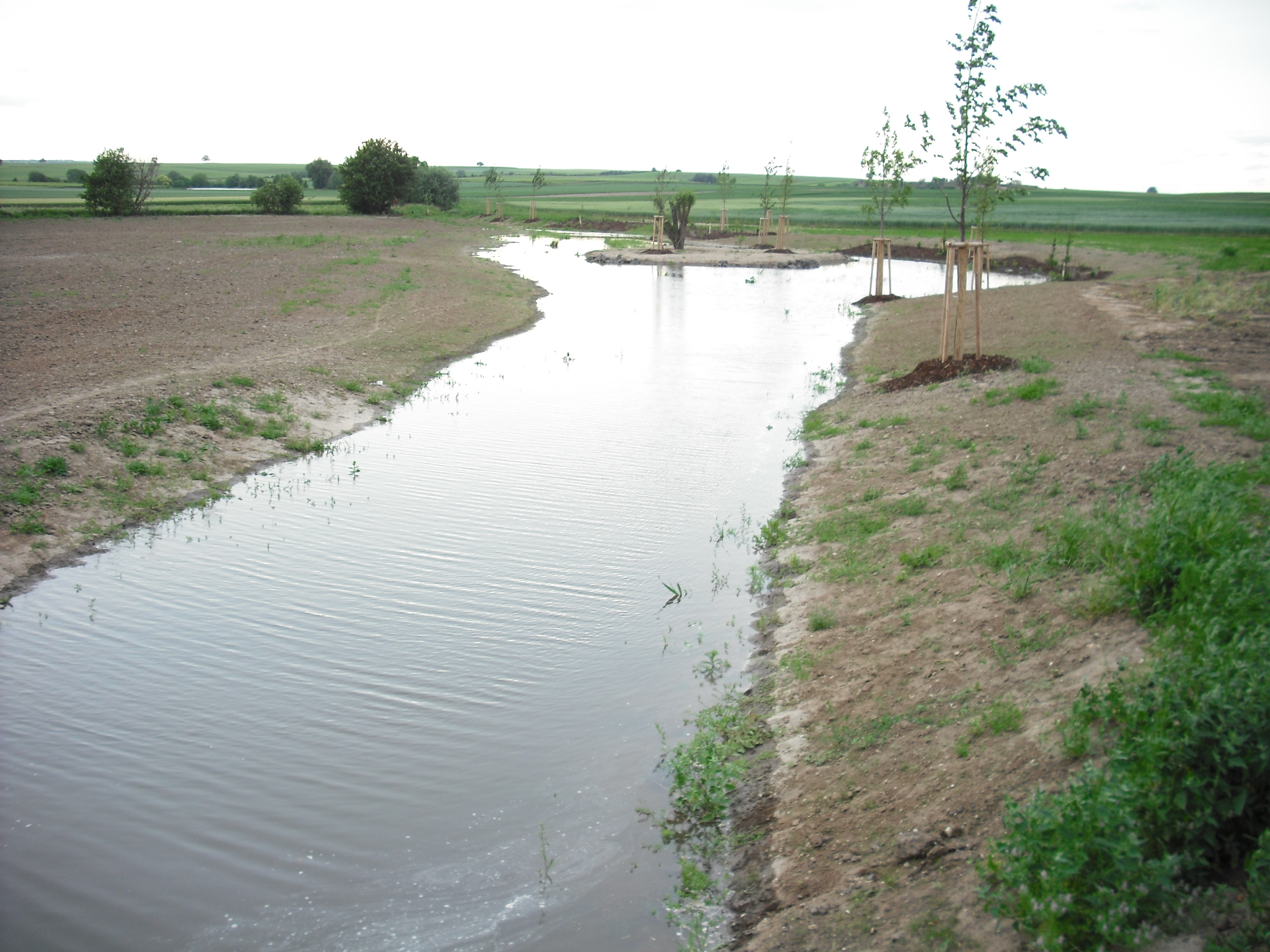
- Immediately after re-naturalisation: The Floßbach northeast of Dirmstein (uppermost of 3 retention basins)

Location
- Location: Germany Rhineland-Palatinate Anterior Palatinate
- Reference no.: DE: 239166

Physical characteristics
- Source
  - location: Confluence: of the Stadtbächen and the Landgraben in the east of Grünstadt
  - coordinates: 49°33′52″N 8°10′08″E
  - elevation: 164 m above sea level (NHN) At the confluence
- Mouth
  - location: In Dirmstein from the left into the Eckbach
  - coordinates: 49°33′44″N 8°15′46″E
  - elevation: 100 m above sea level (NHN)
- Length: 8.1 km
- Basin size: 18.764 km²

Basin features
- Progression: Eckbach→ Rhine→ North Sea
- Landmarks: Small towns: Grünstadt; Villages: Obersülzen, Dirmstein
- Population: 16,800
- Tributaries
  - left: Stream from a hillock near the German Wine Road
  - right: Sausenheimer Graben
- Waterbodies: Reservoirs: On the lower course are three retention basins for times of heavy precipitation

The Floßbach, called the Landgraben in its upper course where, to distinguish it from other streams with the same name, it is also qualified by being referred to as the Grünstädter or Grünstadter Landgraben, is an 8.1-kilometre-long stream and an orographically left-hand headstream of the Eckbach in the northern part of the Anterior Palatinate in the German state of Rhineland-Palatinate. The stream runs entirely on the territory of the town of Grünstadt and the two villages of Obersülzen und Dirmstein that belong to the collective municipality of Grünstadt-Land.

== Literature ==
- Walter Lampert (1975), 1100 Jahre Grünstadt : Ein Heimatbuch (in German), Grünstadt: Stadtverwaltung Grünstadt
