= 20-Pipe Well =

Water well in Rhineland-Palatinate, Germany

Coordinates: 49°30′40″N 08°04′50″E

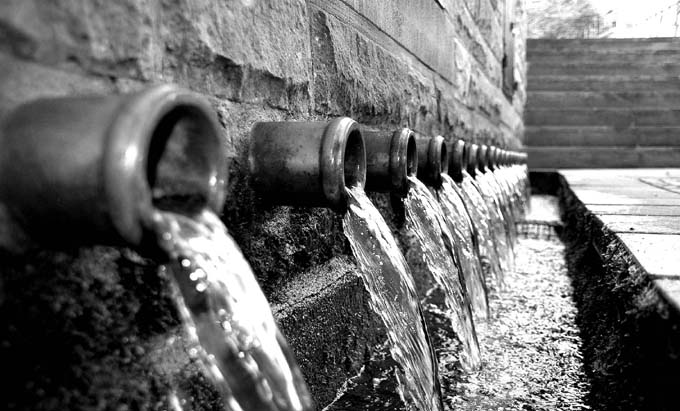
20-Pipe Well

The 20 Pipe Well (German: 20-Röhren-Brunnen) is a water well in the Rhineland-Palatinate village of Altleiningen in the northeast of the Palatinate Forest. The well was probably driven around 1600 and was used originally to supply drinking water to Altleiningen Castle on the hill above. Its present design dates to 1855.

== Geography ==
In the vicinity of the well is the Eckbach stream, which has its own source four kilometres upstream and is a left tributary of the River Rhine. It picks up the water from the 20 Pipe Well, which today supplies the greatest amount of water to the stream. Running past the fountain is the 23-kilometre-long Eckbach Mill Path, which begins at the source of the Eckbach in Hertlingshausen and follows it downstream to Dirmstein in the Upper Rhine Plain.

== Layout ==
The well is fed by the strongest fracture spring (Spaltenquelle) in the Palatinate. The water rises from a fracture and is initially impounded into two large well chambers before being pouring out of 20 parallel pipes. The amount of water is controlled by a system of impounding the ground water which was very well thought through for its day.

Above the well is a protected inscription tablet of sandstone dating to 1855, when the well was given its present appearance; it was also rebuilt in the 1980s, undergoing a thorough renovation including some new components. The inscription is an imaginary dialogue between the walker (W) and the well (B):

Siehe, Wanderer:
Gottes Brünnlein hat Wasser die Fülle!

W.: Ja, Brünnlein, du hast Wassers die Füll;
Gibst Jedem zu trinken, der da will.
B.: Der reiche Gott hat mirs gegeben;
Machs mir nur nach, so wirst du leben!
W.: Was bleibt dann aber mir zuletzt?
B.: Ein Wasser, das ewig dich ergötzt.

...which, translated, means:

See, walker:
God's little spring is overflowing with water!
W.: Yes, little spring, you're full of water;
Give it to everyone who wants some, so they may drink.
B.: God, who is generous, gave it to me;
Just do the same and you will live!
W.: So what, then, will I have in the end?
B.: A kind of water that fills you for ever.

== History ==
The well was built at the behest of the counts of Leiningen in order to improve the water supply to their family seat, the castle of Altleiningen, and to ensure a permanent supply. There are no records of the exact year of construction, but historians estimate that it dates to around 1600.

== Literature ==
- Häberle, Daniel (1908). "Der Brunnen von Altleiningen". Leininger Geschichtsblätter. 7: 1–2.
