= Dradura =

DRADURA Group
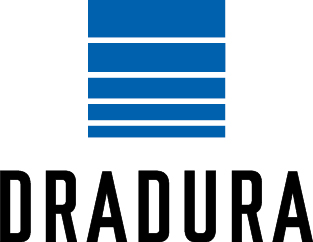
- Company type: Limited company
- Industry: metal industry, wire goods, welding- and modification rod
- Founded: 1811
- Headquarters: Altleiningen, Rhineland-Palatinate, Germany
- Key people: Hans Peter Schmelzer, Thomas Seitz, Jan Kaiser, Mathias Christian Kohler
- Revenue: 88 million € (2025)
- Number of employees: 731 (2026)
- Website: www.dradura.com

DRADURA is an international industrial manufacturing group specializing in high-volume steel wire products and surface treatment technologies. Headquartered in Altleiningen, Germany, the company operates production facilities across Europe. It manufactures steel wire components and employs several hundred people across its international locations. DRADURA focuses on automated, large-scale production of wire components for a range of industrial applications.

== History ==
In 1423, copper and iron mining began in the Altleiningen valley. In 1729, leased an ironworks from the Count of Leiningen. In 1811, Napoleon Bonaparte issued a permit to build a wire-drawing factory in Altleiningen, which was acquired by the Kuhn family in 1860.

In 1941, Georg Stein acquired the wire-drawing factory, which produced mainly wire pins/dowels and chains. In 1948, Stein expanded the product range and purchased new machines. In 1957, the company started producing wire goods. The company was reorganized as the limited partnership Drahtwarenfabrik Drahtzug Stein in 1961, and the production of dishwasher baskets began a year later. In 1964, the company developed a process for the production of seamless flux-cored wires, which went into production two years later.

In 1973, the company founded its first subsidiary Drahtzug Stein saprofil (Société Sablaise de Produits en Fil de Fer) in France.

In 2000, the corporation acquired an interest in the French company Califil. The company Drahtwarenfabrik Drahtzug Stein GmbH & Co. KG was converted into a holding company in 2001.

In 2003, Drahtzug Stein Beteiligungsgesellschaft mbH (investment company) was founded. The following year, the company DSWI Sp. z o.o. (today: Drahtzug Stein Lodz) was established as a joint venture with Wire Industries in Łódź, Poland. With these measures, Drahtzug Stein followed the outsourcing of production in the appliance industry to Eastern Europe. In 2006, Drahtzug Stein acquired most of its competitor Wire Industries; only the Italian and Spanish brands, Omim and Come, continued independently.

In 2005, the subsidiary Drahtzug Stein spb was established in St. Petersburg, and in 2007, Drahtzug Stein USA Corp. was founded in New Bern, North Carolina. The workforce in Altleiningen increased from eight workers in 1941 to around 550 in 2009. The group employed around 1,350 people in 2009.

In 2016, the Stein family sold DRADURA to the private equity firm Emeram Capital Partners, and in 2021, parts of the original DRADURA group went through an insolvency process.

In 2021, DRADURA was acquired from its previous owner by Linkk Industrial GmbH, Bremen. The transaction marked a change in ownership and formed part of a broader strategic development of the company, including continued investment in engineering capabilities and production processes.

=== Technology and Manufacturing ===
DRADURA manufactures steel wire components used in various industrial applications, including dishwasher baskets, oven racks, storage systems, and medical devices. The company operates automated production lines and uses surface finishing technologies such as galvanization, nickel-chrome plating, electropolishing, and polymer coatings. Its capabilities include wire forming, welding, and a range of surface finishing technologies such as galvanization, nickel-chrome plating, electropolishing, and polymer coatings.

=== Operations ===
DRADURA operates production facilities in Łódź (Poland) and in San Donà di Piave and Conzano (Italy).

=== Locations ===
Current locations:

- Altleiningen (Germany)
  - Dradura Group GmbH
- Łodź (Poland)
  - Dradura Polska Sp. z o. o.
- New Bern (USA)
  - Dradura USA Corp.
- Italy
  - Dradura Italia S.R.L (San Donà di Piave)
  - Dradura Italia S.R.L (Conzano)

Previous locations (not part of DRADURA Group GmbH):

- France
  - Dradura France Cusset SAS (Cusset)
  - Saprofil S.A.R.L. (Olonne-sur-Mer)
- Czech Republic
  - Dradura Česká republika s.r.o. (Olomouc)
