= Village Mill, Großkarlbach =

Water mill in Rhineland-Palatinate, Germany

Village Mill
- Dorfmühle
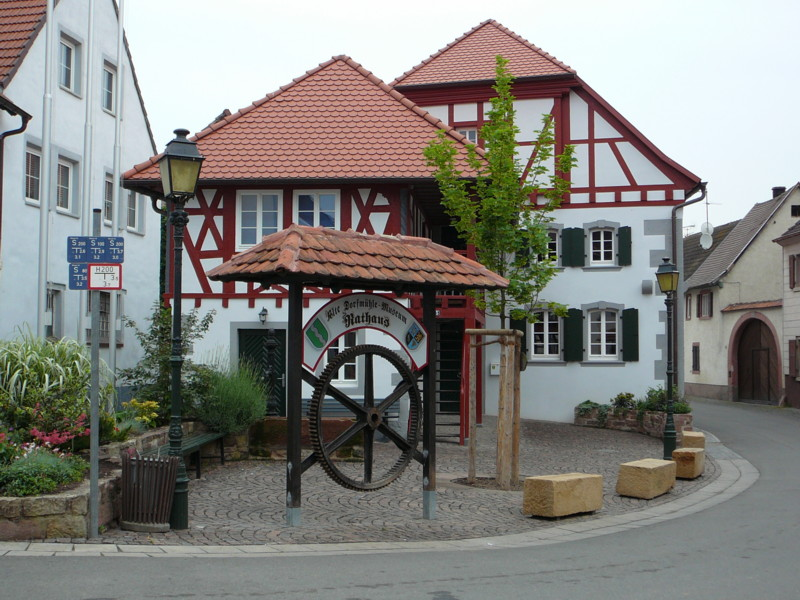
- The Village Mill from the northeast

General information
- Status: Leiningerland Mill Museum
- Type: water mill
- Town or city: Großkarlbach
- Coordinates: 49.53892000°N 8.22243000°E
- Construction started: latest 1602

The Village Mill (German: Dorfmühle) in the Rhineland-Palatinate village of Großkarlbach was once a working mill that was driven by water power. Following its restoration it became a show mill and houses the Großkarlbach Mill Museum; albeit several rooms are used for the Bürgermeister's office and municipal archives, as well as for youth and old people activities and conferences.

== Location ==
The village mill is at Kändelgasse 15 in the historic village centre on the left bank of the Eckbach, whose water once drove its two water wheels. Of the original seven mills in Großkarlbach it was the only one that lay within the gates of the fortified medieval village, hence its name. The Eckbach Mill Path, established in 1997 on the initiative of Kleinkarlbach mill expert, Wolfgang Niederhöfer, runs past the mill. Five of the mills in the village are still more or less well preserved, four have been converted to residential homes. Of these, the Pappelmühle ("Poplar Mill") worked until the 1980s.

== Literature ==
- Georg Peter Karn; Ulrike Weber (2006), Denkmaltopographie Bundesrepublik Deutschland : Kulturdenkmäler in Rheinland-Pfalz (in German), vol. Band 13: Kreis Bad Dürkheim, Teil 2: Stadt Grünstadt, Verbandsgemeinden Freinsheim, Grünstadt-Land und Hettenleidelheim, Worms: Verlag Werner, ISBN 3-88462-215-3
- Wolfgang Niederhöfer; Verbandsgemeinde Grünstadt-Land, eds. (1997), Festschrift zur Eröffnung des Mühlenwanderweges (in German), Kleinkarlbach/Grünstadt, ohne ISBN, p. 24
