= Eckbachweiher =

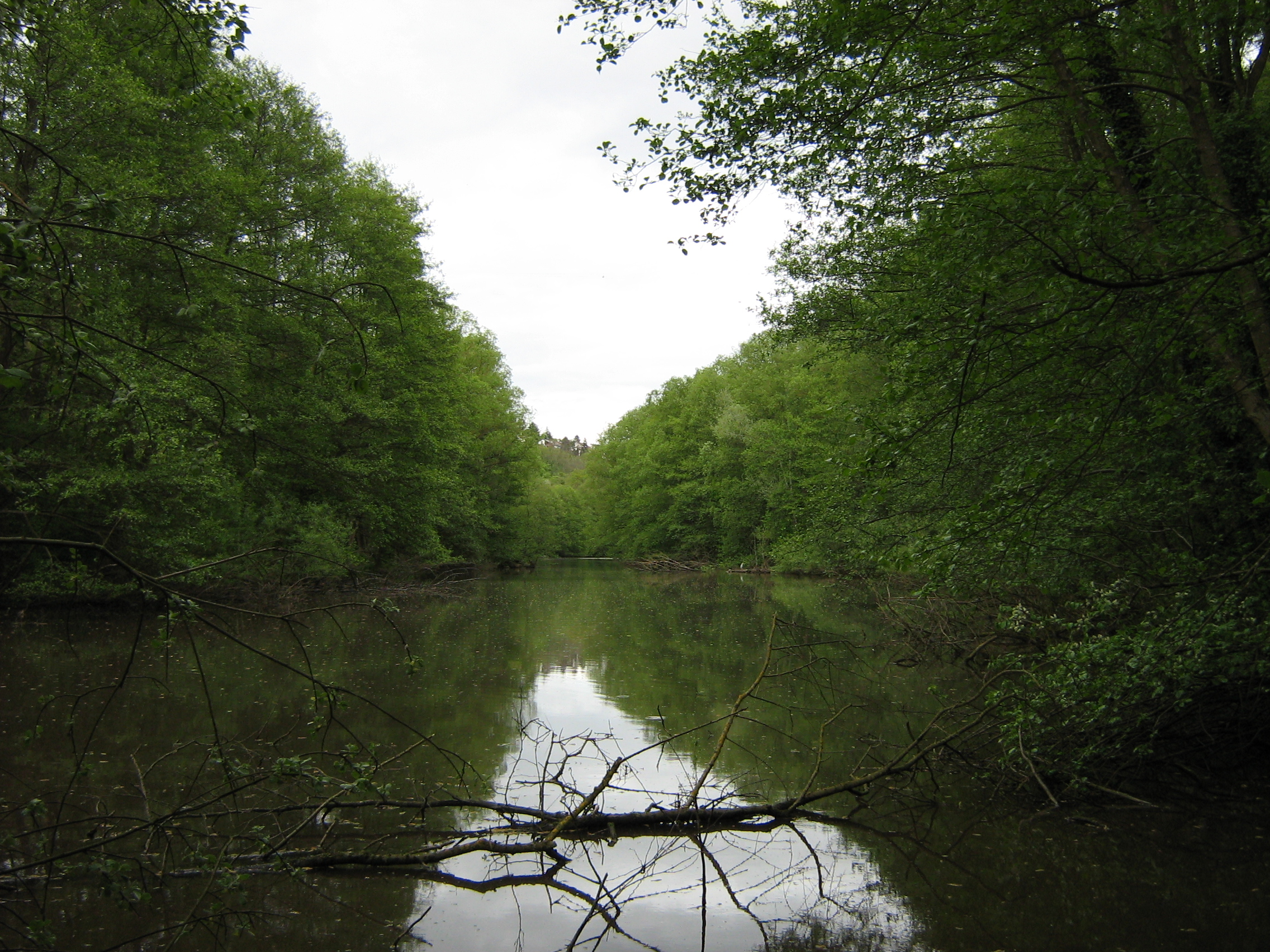
- The Eckbachweiher (looking towards the dam)

- Location within Rhineland-Palatinate
- Location: Palatinate Forest (Rhineland-Palatinate)
- Coordinates: 49°32′17″N 8°07′44″E
- Primary inflows: Eckbach
- Primary outflows: Eckbach
- Basin countries: Germany
- Max. length: 0.56 km (0.35 mi)
- Max. width: 0.032 km (0.020 mi)
- Surface elevation: 180 m (590 ft)

The Eckbachweiher in the Palatine Leiningerland in the German state of Rhineland-Palatinate is a woog on the Eckbach stream. A woog is the name given to still bodies of water, especially man-made reservoirs, in southwest Germany.

== Geography ==
The Eckbachweiher lies in the northeast of the Palatinate Forest at a height of about 180 metres in the parish of Neuleiningen-Tal, which belongs to the collective municipality of Grünstadt-Land. The lake runs in a southwest to northwest direction south of and parallel to the road up the valley, which is identical with the Landesstraße 520 from Carlsberg to Kleinkarlbach).

== Dimensions ==
The length of the reservoir is 560 metres and its maximum width is 32 metres.

== History ==
The reservoir was laid out in the Middle Ages in as the water reservoir for two mills below it. In those days it was rather smaller. In the 1870s the dam was raised in order to increase the volume of the lake. As a result, the Eckbach valley was better protected from flooding, which could occur especially in spring after heavy winter snows.

The Eckbachweiher also ensured the operation of the two mills in periods of drought. The upper mill (Obermühle), immediately below the dam, has fallen down. The “rock mill” (Felsenmühle) a little way to the east of it is larger and well restored. It is a complex of buildings grouped around a cobbled inner courtyard and operated as a hotel-restaurant.

== Sights and culture ==
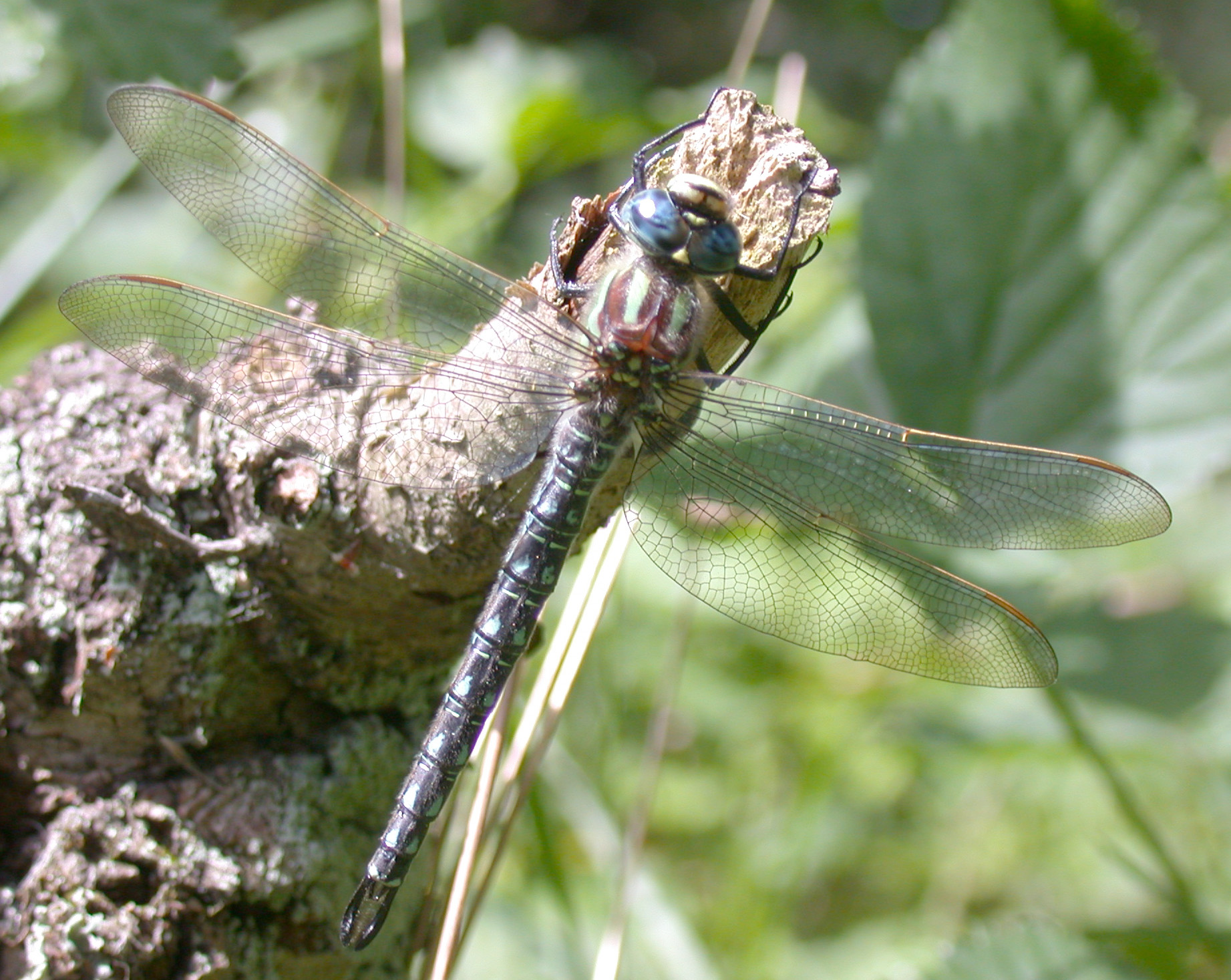
Hairy Dragonfly

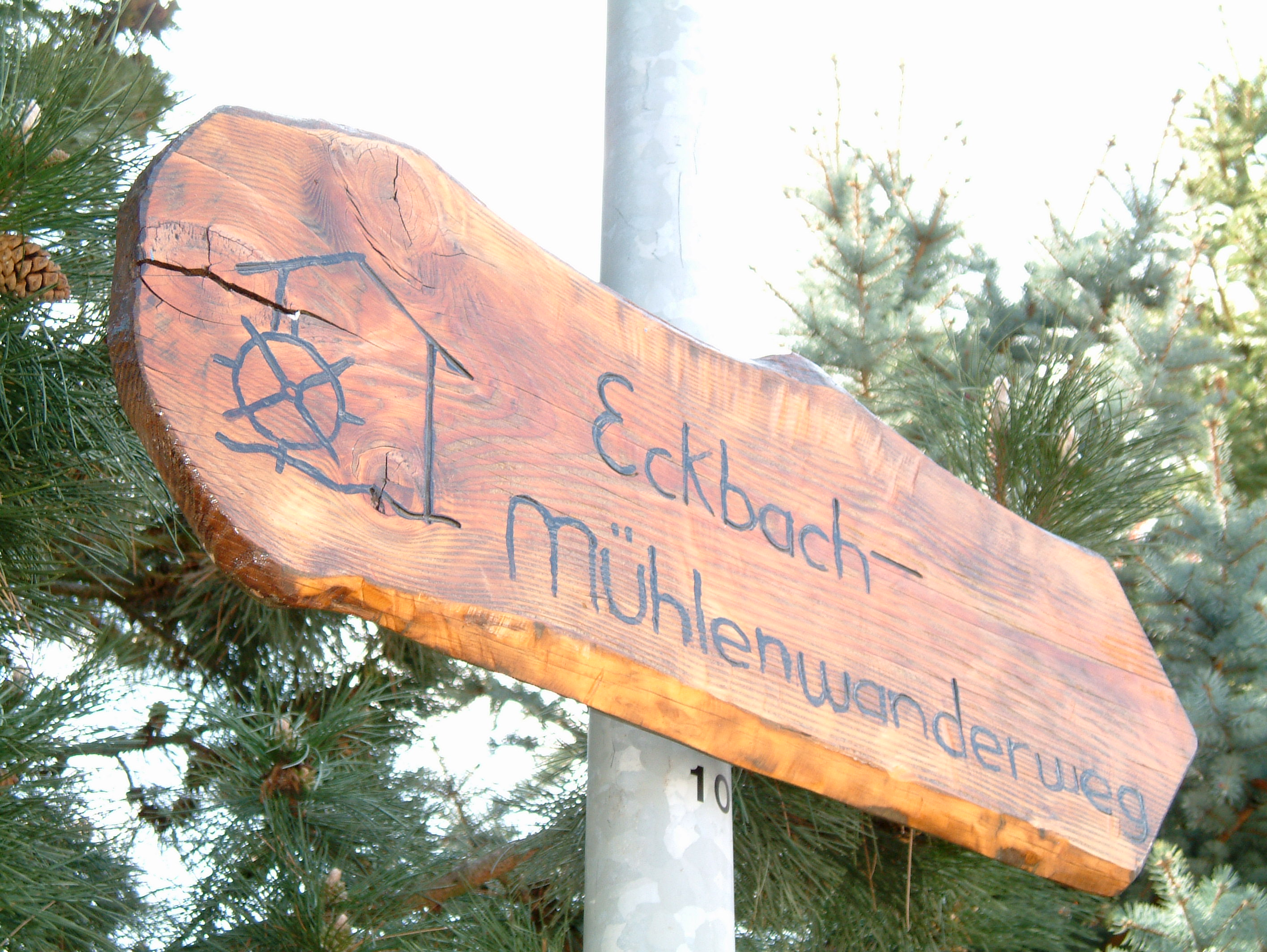
Signposting of the Eckbach Mill Trail

The Eckbachweiher is known to biologists as a Rückzugsgebiet for native dragonflies and also offers a habitat for endangered species, like the Hairy Dragonfly (Brachytron pratense).

The Eckbach Mill Trail, which links the 23 mills of the region, some of which are restored, also runs along the Eckbachweiher. Some two kilometres east of the lake, left and right above the exit to the Eckbach valley into the Upper Rhine Plain lie on two foothills of the Haardt the castles of Neuleiningen and Battenberg, which used to belong to the House of Leiningen and guarded the entrance to the valley. At Altleiningen Castle, the former main residence of the family, located three kilometres southwest of the lake, performances by a local theatre company, the Burgspiele Altleiningen, are held during the summer months.
