= Floßbach =

Floßbach may refer to the following streams or river in Germany:

- Floßbach (Eckbach), left tributary of the Eckbach in Rhineland-Palatinate
- Floßbach (Isenach), right tributary of the Isenach in Rhineland-Palatinate
- Floßbach (Mohrbach), right tributary of the Mohrbach in Rhineland-Palatinate
- Floßbach (Speyerbach), left side arm of the Speyerbach in Rhineland-Palatinate
- Floßbach (Krähenbach, upper course), upper course of the Krähenbach on the main left arm near Krähenbach, Löffingen, county of Breisgau-Hochschwarzwald, Baden-Württemberg, into which the Gauchach flows
- Floßbach (Krähenbach, tributary) right tributary of the Krähenbach below Krähenbach, Löffingen, county of Breisgau-Hochschwarzwald, Baden-Württemberg, to which the Gauchach flows

See also:

- Floß, a municipality in the district of Neustadt (Waldnaab), Bavaria, Germany
