= Altleiningen Castle =

Castle in Germany

- Burg Altleiningen
- Altleiningen
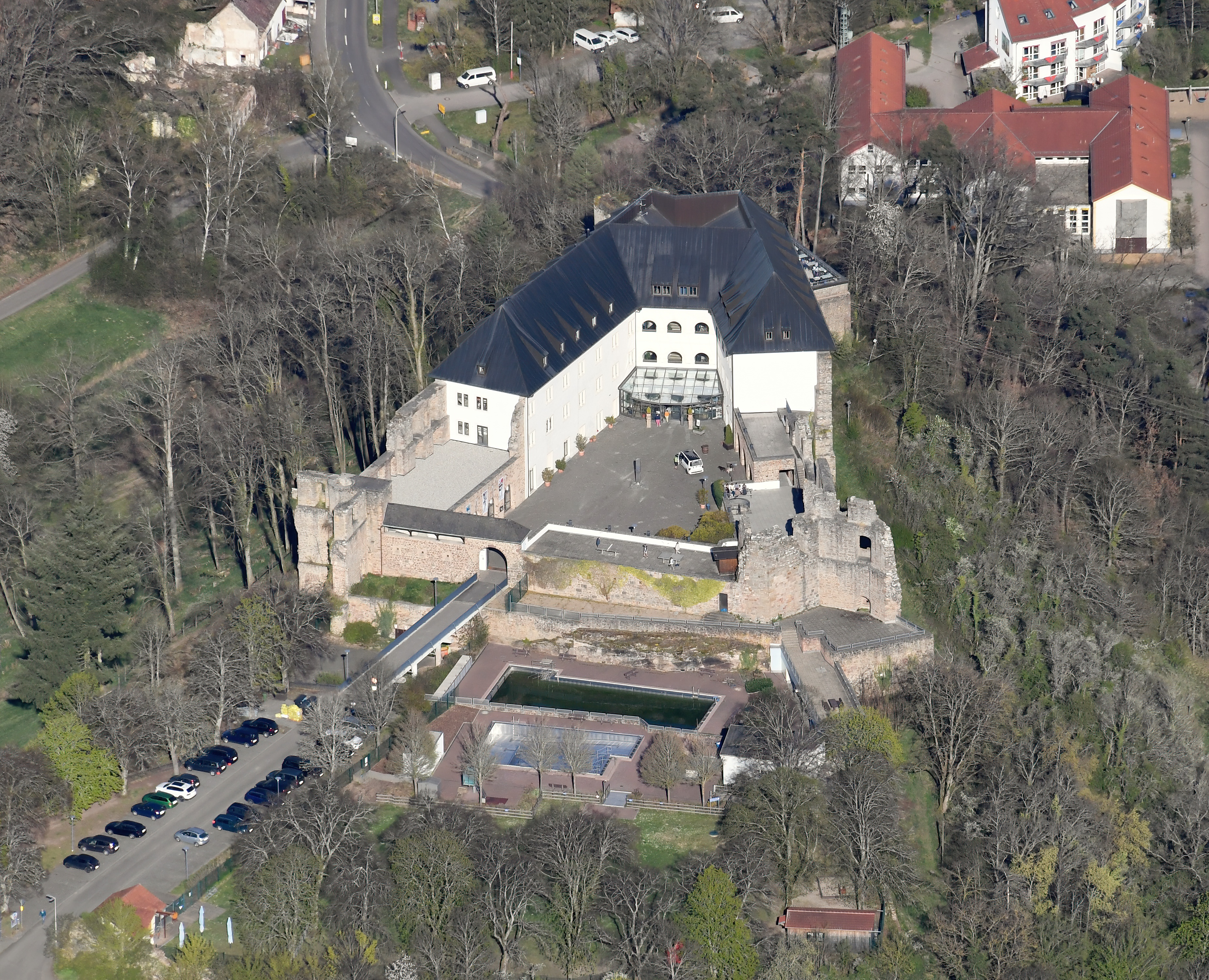
- Aerial view of the castle

Site information
- Type: hill castle, spur castle
- Code: DE-RP
- Condition: preserved or largely preserved

Location
- Coordinates: 49°30′41″N 8°04′58″E
- Height: 400 m above sea level (NN)

Site history
- Built: around 1100 to 1110

Garrison information
- Occupants: counts

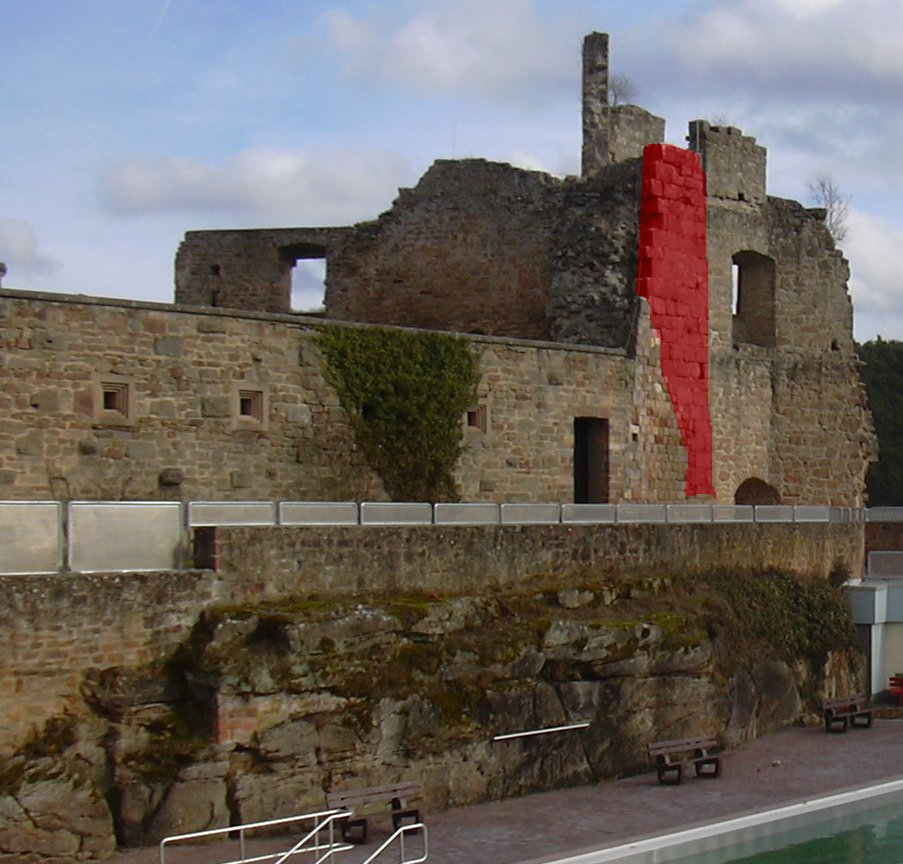
Remains of the Hohenstaufen-era shield wall (in red)

Altleiningen is a castle in the Palatinate Forest in Germany. It lies in the parish of Altleiningen in the county of Bad Dürkheim in the German state of Rhineland-Palatinate.

== Location ==
Whilst the parish of Altleiningen lies at 300 metres above sea level along the length of the valley of the Eckbach, the hill castle was built on the domed summit of a hill, about 400 metres high, that rises above the left bank of the Eckbach.

== History ==
The name, like that of its sister castle, Neuleiningen 5 kilometres northeast, is derived from the Frankish noble family of Leiningen, who used to rule the territory of the Leiningerland.

The mighty hill fortress is built on rocks and was probably established around 1100 to 1110 by the Count of Leiningen, Emich I, and his son, Emich II, under the name of Leiningen Castle. The overall castle site, which follows the shape of the hilltop, has a triangular ground plan. Of the original caste, only a few wall remains on the west side have survived. The outer ward was surrounded by its own moat and by a main ditch hewn out of the rock, over which there was a drawbridge that separated it from the actual castle. Two kilometres to the south of the castle, Emich II founded Höningen Abbey around 1120.

During the peasants' uprising in 1525 the castle suffered its first destruction. The present site is based on its rebuilding in the Renaissance style, beginning in 1528, by counts Cuno II, Philip I, Louis and John Casimir. Its reconstruction required the local farmers to render socage.

Around 1600 a gallery was driven deep into the rock below the castle in order to obtain a supply of water. The 20-Pipe Well is today the biggest source of water for the Eckbach.

In 1690 the castle was destroyed again, this time for good, during the War of the Palatine Succession by French troops. Thereafter it was used as a quarry until the mid-19th century when this was banned by the government of the Kingdom of Bavaria. Until 1933 the terrain remained in the hands of the counts of Leiningen (Leiningen-Westerburg-Altleiningen line), before it was procured by the county of Frankenthal. In 1962 the ruins were listed and the schloss wing rebuilt in the six years that followed. In doing so they incorporated the wall remains on the western side.

== Present usage ==
=== Leisure ===
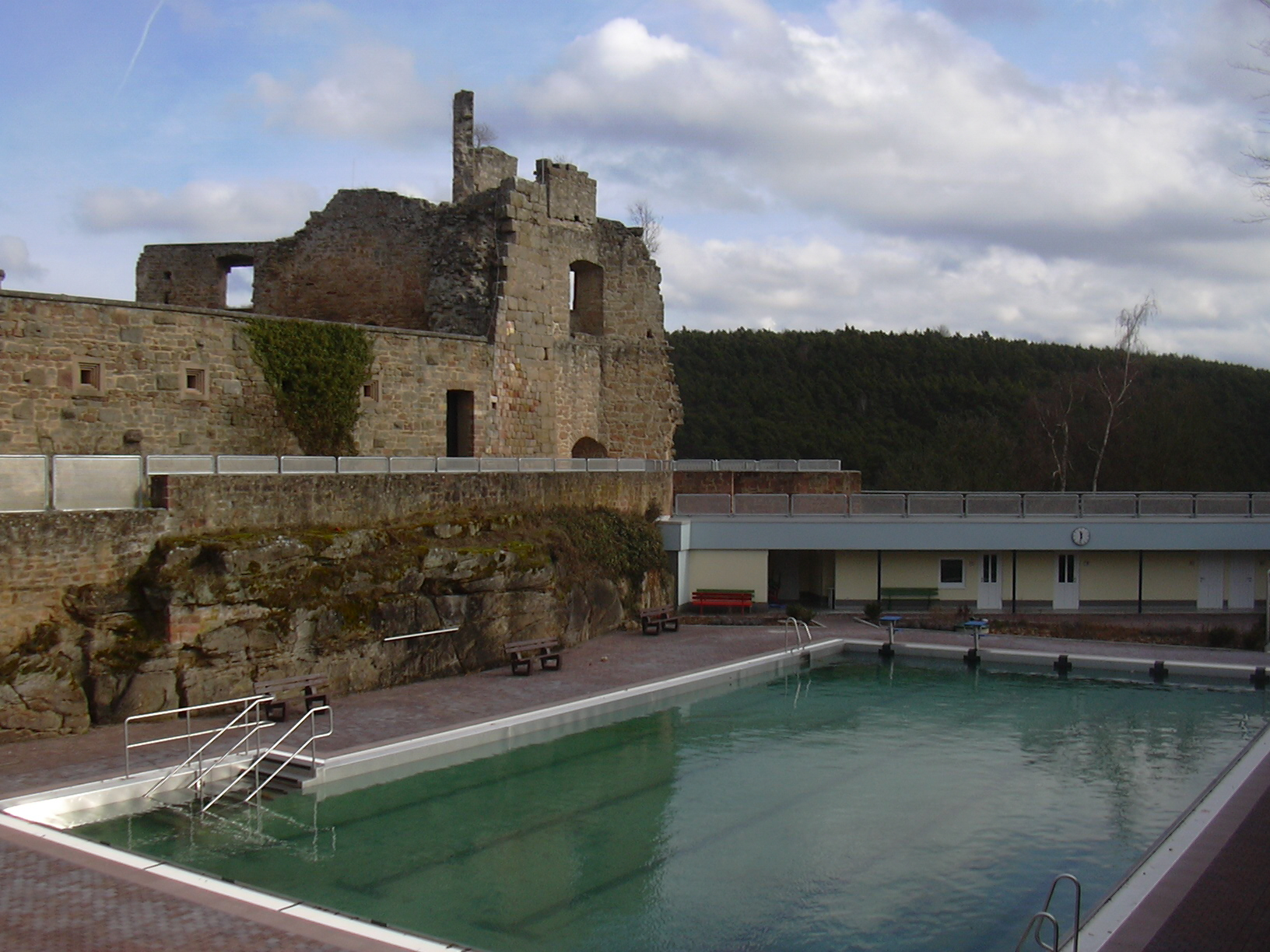
Swimming pool in the old moat and the ruins of the palas

In 1968 a youth hostel was integrated into the partially rebuilt castle. This was completely modernized between 1998 and 2000. As part of this renovation the castle was given a gable roof again; previously it had had a flat, 1960s-style roof. The great hall (Rittersaal) is used as a dining room; another guest room is the Burgschänke pub with its summer terrace. The main moat has been converted into a public open air swimming pool.

=== Culture ===
The covered "hall of honour" (Ehrenhalle), a room separated from the arcades to the courtyard, has around 250 visitor seats. Since 1980 the amateur dramatics group, the Altleiningen Castle Players (Burgspiele Altleiningen) have offered a summer programme of theatre productions. These include both classical as well as modern productions, mostly with a historic theme, something that matches the ambience.

=== Nature ===
In the vaults of the castle cellars is the largest colony of wild bats in Germany. For biotope conservation reasons, visitors are not allowed access.

== Literature ==
- Jürgen Keddigkeit, Alexander Thon, Karl Scheurer Rolf Übel: Pfälzisches Burgenlexikon, Vol. 1: A-E. 2nd edition. Institut für pfälzische Geschichte und Volkskunde Kaiserslautern, Kaiserslautern, 2003, ISBN 3-927754-51-X, pp. 131–147.
- Hans Heiberger: 1200 Jahre Altleiningen. 780–1980. Heidelberger Verlagsanstalt, Heidelberg, 1980.
- Hans Heiberger: Die Grafen zu Leiningen-Westerburg. Ursprung, Glanz, Niedergang. Kiliandruckerei Dinges, Grünstadt, 1983, ISBN 3-924386-00-5.
- Alexander Thon (ed.): Wie Schwalbennester an den Felsen geklebt. Burgen in der Nordpfalz. 1st edition, Schnell und Steiner, Regensburg, 2005, ISBN 3-7954-1674-4, pp. 22–25.
