= Landgraben =

Landgraben may refer to:

- Landgraben (Dresden), a river of Saxony, Germany
- Landgraben (Mecklenburg-Vorpommern), a river of Mecklenburg-Vorpommern, Germany
