= Altleiningen =

- Municipality
- Coat of arms

- Location of Altleiningen within Bad Dürkheim district
- Interactive map of Altleiningen
- Location within Germany Location within Rhineland-Palatinate
- Coordinates: 49°30′29″N 08°04′28″E
- Country: Germany
- State: Rhineland-Palatinate
- District: Bad Dürkheim
- Municipal assoc.: Leiningerland

Government
  - Mayor (2019–24): Gunther Schneider

Area
  - Total: 11.47 km^{2} (4.43 sq mi)
- Elevation: 301 m (988 ft)

Population (2025-12-31)
  - Total: 1,712
  - Density: 149.3/km^{2} (386.6/sq mi)
- Time zone: UTC+01:00 (CET)
  - Summer (DST): UTC+02:00 (CEST)
- Postal codes: 67317
- Dialling codes: 06356
- Vehicle registration: DÜW
- Website: www.vg-l.de/ortsgemeinden/altleiningen/

Altleiningen is an Ortsgemeinde – a municipality belonging to a Verbandsgemeinde, a kind of collective municipality – in the Bad Dürkheim district in Rhineland-Palatinate, Germany.

== Geography ==
=== Location ===
The municipality lies at an elevation of 300 m above sea level in the northeast Palatinate Forest in the valley of the Eckbach, a 39 km-long brook that empties into the Rhine. Altleiningen belongs to the Verbandsgemeinde of Leiningerland, whose seat is in Grünstadt.

== History ==
=== Name ===
Altleiningen, originally Leiningen, had its first documentary mention in 780 when the 50 km-distant Lorsch Abbey’s catalogue of holdings listed a woodland holding in linunga marca (Latin for “in the Leiningen area”). The naming referred to the Leinbaum, a name used locally at the time mostly for the Norway Maple, but sometimes also for the large-leaved linden. Since both trees were often found growing alongside the Eckbach, the brook at this time also went by the name Leinbach.

From the municipality's name also sprang the noble family Leiningen’s name. This family held the so-called Leiningerland for centuries.

=== Local administration ===
After the Second World War, the municipality belonged at first to the Frankenthal district, which in the course of administrative reform in Rhineland-Palatinate was abolished in 1969. Altleiningen then found itself in the newly created district of Bad Dürkheim. In 1972, Altleiningen also found itself in the likewise newly created Verbandsgemeinde of Hettenleidelheim.

=== Religion ===
In 2007, 45.7% of the inhabitants were Evangelical and 30.1% Catholic. The rest belonged to other faiths or adhered to none.

== Politics ==
=== Municipal council ===
The municipal election held on 7 June 2009 yielded the following results:

Parties and voter communities	% 2009	Seats 2009	Difference to 2004
WG Dennhardt	35.0	6	+2
FWG	32.8	5	-2
SPD	20.5	3	+1
WG Köhler	6.3	1	+1
CDU	5.4	1	-2

=== Mayors ===
since 2019 Gunther Schneider
2009–2019 Frank Dennhardt (WG)
1992–2009 Karl Meister (FWG)
1990–1992 Michael Haab (CDU)
1979–1990 Otwin Frank (FWG)
1974–1979 Jakob Neu (CDU)
1971–1974 Gerd Abel (WG)
1969–1971 Friedrich Dörner (WG)
1952–1969 Jakob Neu (CDU)
1948–1952 August Dörner
1945–1948 Christoph Bohn II.
1934–1945 Johannes Jotter II.
1933 (June–December) August Alebrand

1931–1933 Christoph Bohn II.
1910–1931 Karl Heinrich Klein
1899–1909 Heinrich Müller
1894–1899 Karl Krauß I.
1871–1894 Heinrich Müller III.
1870–1871 Johann Müller IV.
1859–1869 Philipp Jakob Zimmermann
1848–1859 Samuel Krebill
1844–1848 Heinrich Krebill
1842–1844 Heinrich Haartung
1820–1842 Abraham Krebill
1814–1820 Jakob Zimmermann
1808–1814 Abraham Krebill
1804–1808 Georg Walter

=== Coat of arms ===
The German blazon reads: In Rot ein schwebendes angetatztes goldenes Kreuz mit eingeschlagenen eichenblattartigen Verzierungen an den Balkenenden, bewinkelt von vier silbernen Adlern.

The municipality's arms might in English heraldic language be described thus: Gules a cross pattée couped with an oakleaf adornment at the end of each arm Or between four eagles displayed argent.

The arms were approved by the now defunct Regierungsbezirk of Rheinhessen-Pfalz. It goes back to a seal from 1716. They match arms borne by the Counts of Leiningen-Westerburg, who had their ancestral seat at Castle Altleiningen.

== Culture and sightseeing ==
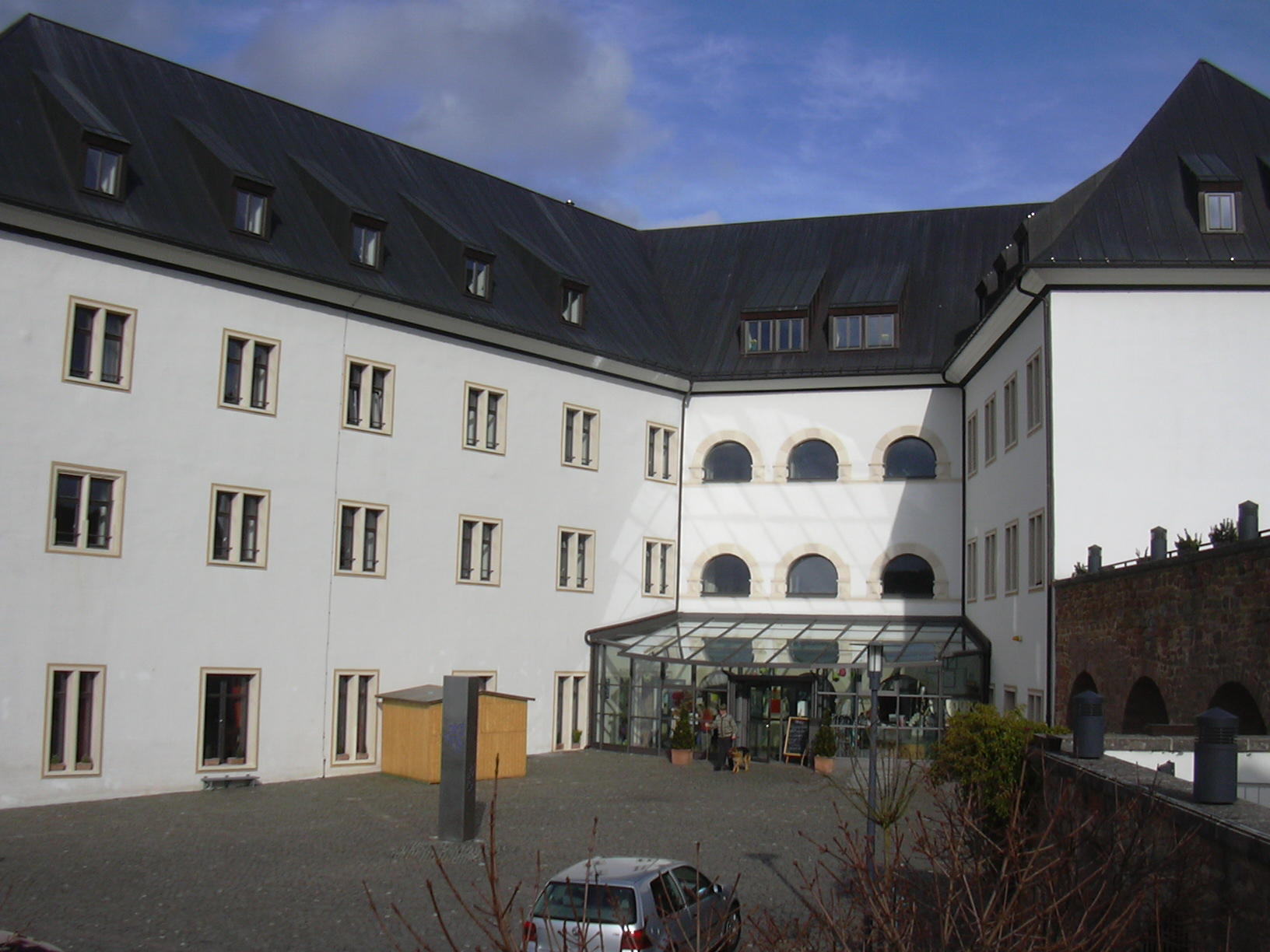
Castle's inner ward, nowadays a youth hostel

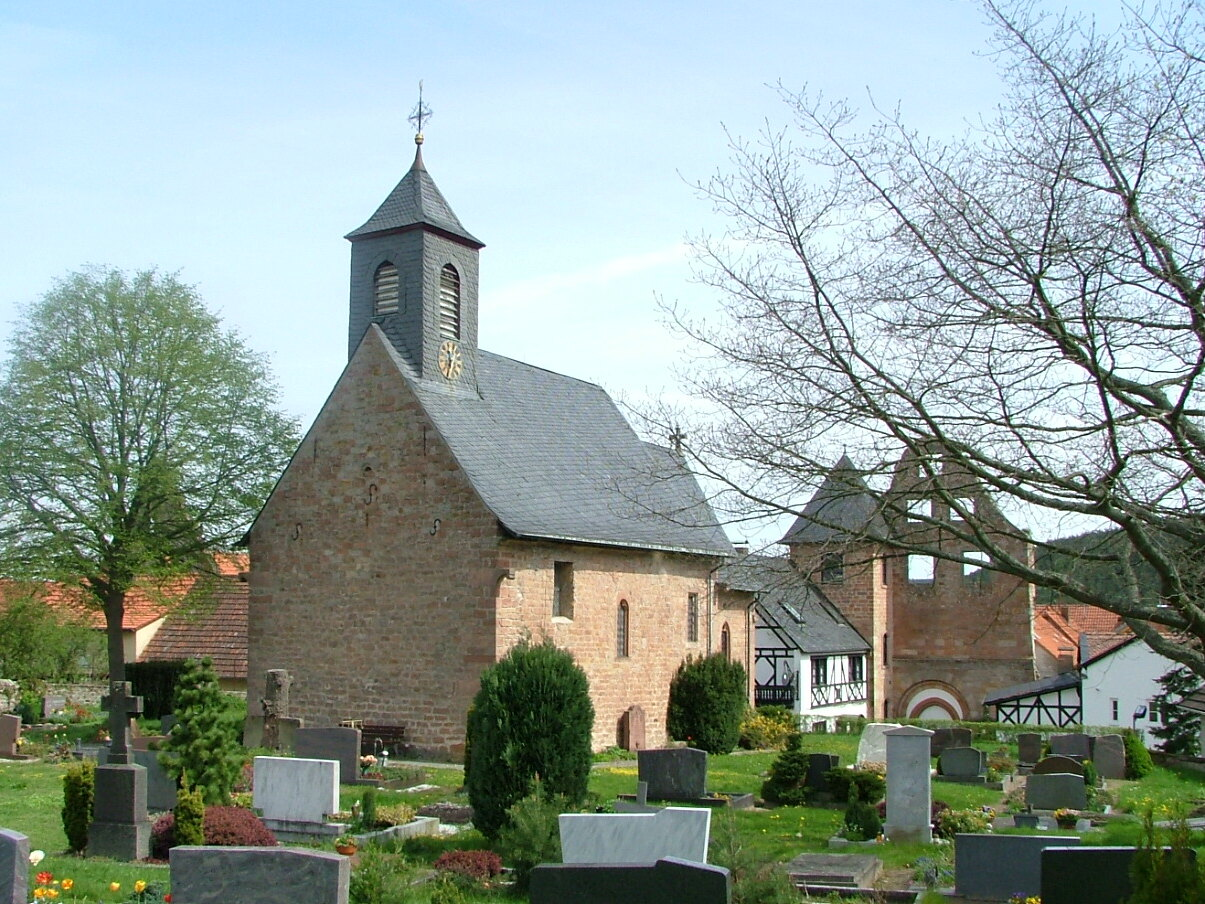
St. Jacob's in the outlying centre of Höningen. in the background at right, the ruined monastery church's west gable

=== Altleiningen Castle ===
Altleiningen Castle (Burg Altleiningen) was built on the summit of a hill, some 400 metres high, that rises above the left bank of the Eckbach. Within the castle are a youth hostel and – in the moat – a heated swimming pool. In the roofed Ehrenhalle – "Hall of Honour" – a room separated from the castle courtyard by arcades, the amateur theatre group, the Altleiningen Castle Players (Burgspiele Altleiningen) has been producing challenging plays – classical, modern, often also some with historical aspects – every year in the summer months since 1980.

=== Höningen Abbey and the Church of St. James ===
At Höningen, about 2 km to the south, are the Romanesque Church of St. James (Kirche St. Jacob) and the remnants of the canonical monastery of Höningen. The latter has a gateway arch at the north entrance, and the west gables of the convent buildings and monastery church are parallel to the modern high street. Saint James’ and the abbey were both built about 1120. Two letters patent, one each from Pope Innocent II and Emperor Friedrich Barbarossa, underscore the monastery's importance at the time of its founding.

=== Höningen Latin School ===
Recalling the Höningen Latin School (Höninger Lateinschule, 1573–1630), in which the Leininger-Gymnasium in Grünstadt has its roots, is a gatehouse at the way into the back alley.

=== 20-Pipe Well ===
From the 20-Pipe Well (20-Röhren-Brunnen), which is fed from an adit that was sunk deep into the cliff about 1600 to supply the castle above with water, the Eckbach nowadays draws most of its flow. It is also here that the 19 km-long Eckbach Mill cycling and hiking path begins, which follows the river downstream to Dirmstein.

== Economy and infrastructure ==
=== Established businesses ===
The industrial location Drahtzug lies on the Eckbach 2 km northeast of the village and is named after the Drahtzug Stein GmbH + Co. KG, which has its production facility there. The business is the Bad Dürkheim district's biggest employer.

=== Transport ===
The Leiningen Valley Railway once ran from Altleiningen to Grünstadt. Passenger services were operated on the line from 1903 to 1969 and, until late 2005, the remaining section of railway still operated goods traffic on the Grünstadt–Drahtzug section to serve the factory.

The bus service on the Grünstadt–Altleiningen route stops at Drahtzug.

== Famous people ==
=== Sons and daughters of the town ===
- Phil Jutzi, film director
- Winfried Storhas, professor of Bioreaction technology, University of Mannheim

=== Famous people associated with the municipality ===
- Silvio Adzic, footballer, grew up in Altleiningen
