= Stumpfwald =

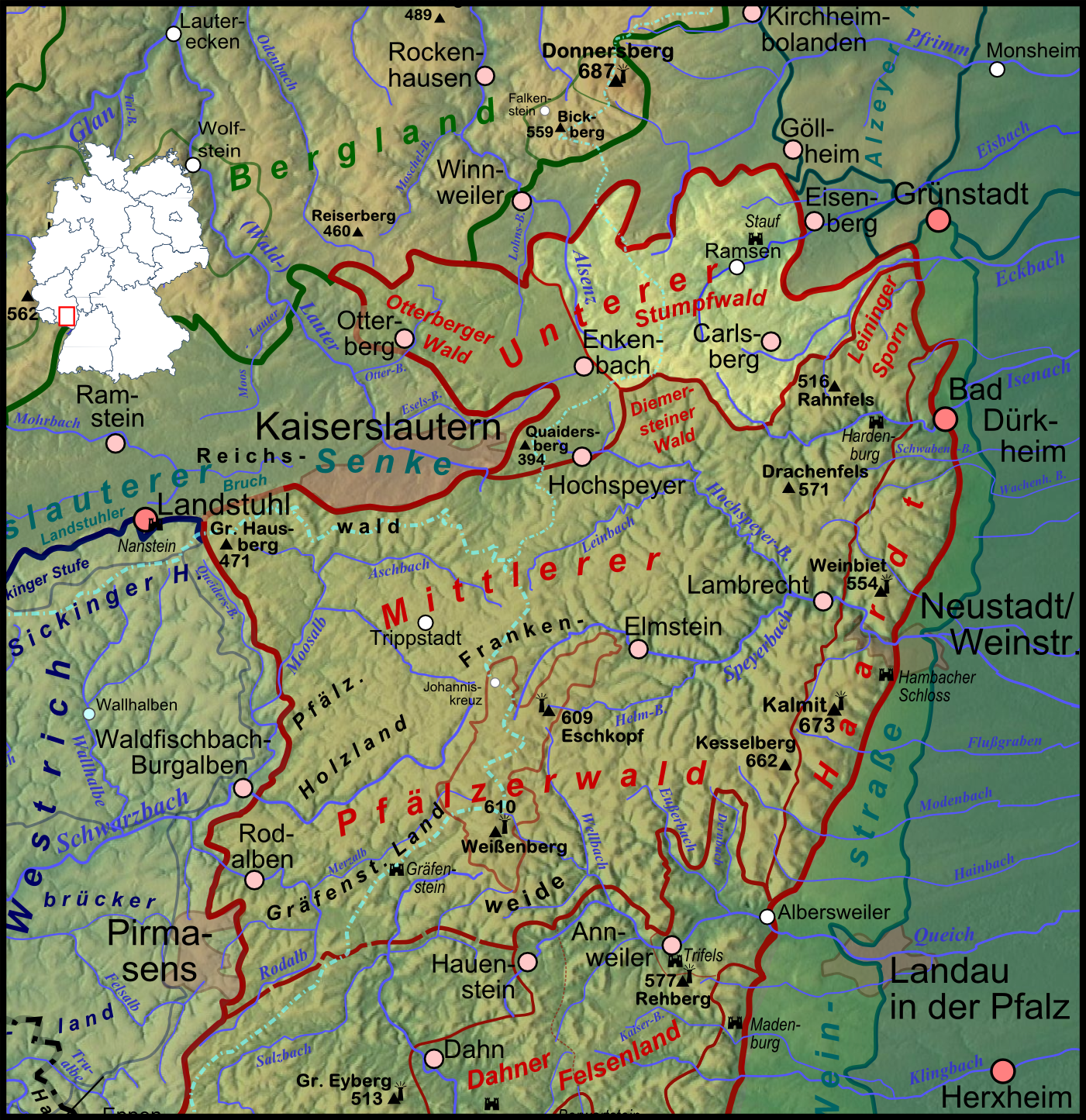
The Stumpfwald (orange) within the Palatine Forest

The Stumpfwald is part of the northern Palatine Forest and is located in the south of the German state of Rhineland-Palatinate. It covers an area of about 150 km^{2}, most of which is part of North Palatinate and runs from west to east on the territories of Enkenbach-Alsenborn (county of Kaiserslautern) and Ramsen (county of Donnersbergkreis). It has given its name to the Stumpfwaldgericht, an old thingstead, and the heritage line of the Stumpfwald Railway.

== Geography and geology ==
The hills and woods of the Stumpfwald, bisected by valleys in all directions, have an average height of just under 400 m above sea level (NHN). The stream with the greatest volumetric flow in the Stumpfwald is the upper Eisbach and its headstream, the Bockbach.

Geologically, the Stumpfwald - like most of the Palatine uplands - is predominantly made of bunter sandstone, which was formed from wind-blown desert sand about 250 million years ago (during the Permian / Triassic transition) in what was then the Germanic Basin. Together with the neighbouring Otterberg Forest to the west (on the far side of Alsenz), the region is also called the Lower Palatinate Forest by many geoscientists. In the north it descends to the valley of the Pfrimm, which flows past Worms into the River Rhine, in the east it borders on the distinctive Leininger Sporn (516 m) and, in the south, on the Diemerstein Forest and the upper reaches of the Isenach.

The region is accessible to motor traffic on the Landesstraße 395, which runs uphill from Ramsen to Enkenbach. The A 6 motorway from Mannheim to Saarbrücken runs along the southern edge of the forest, and five to ten miles to the north is the A 63 motorway from Kaiserslautern to Mainz. The Eis Valley Railway that originally ran parallel to the main road from Grünstadt to Enkenbach-Alsenborn was re-opened again after having been closed in the 1980s and nowadays is worked by tourist services.

== History ==
=== Name ===
Documents from the years 765 and 1330 called the area Stamp, but others dated 1357, 1494 and 1596, referred to it as Stampf. The word was used of places where it was necessary because of the very steep slopes to walk with "stomping steps" (''stampfenden Schritten). In ignorance of its derivation the name was later changed to Stumpfwald ("Stumpf Wood").

=== Formal development ===
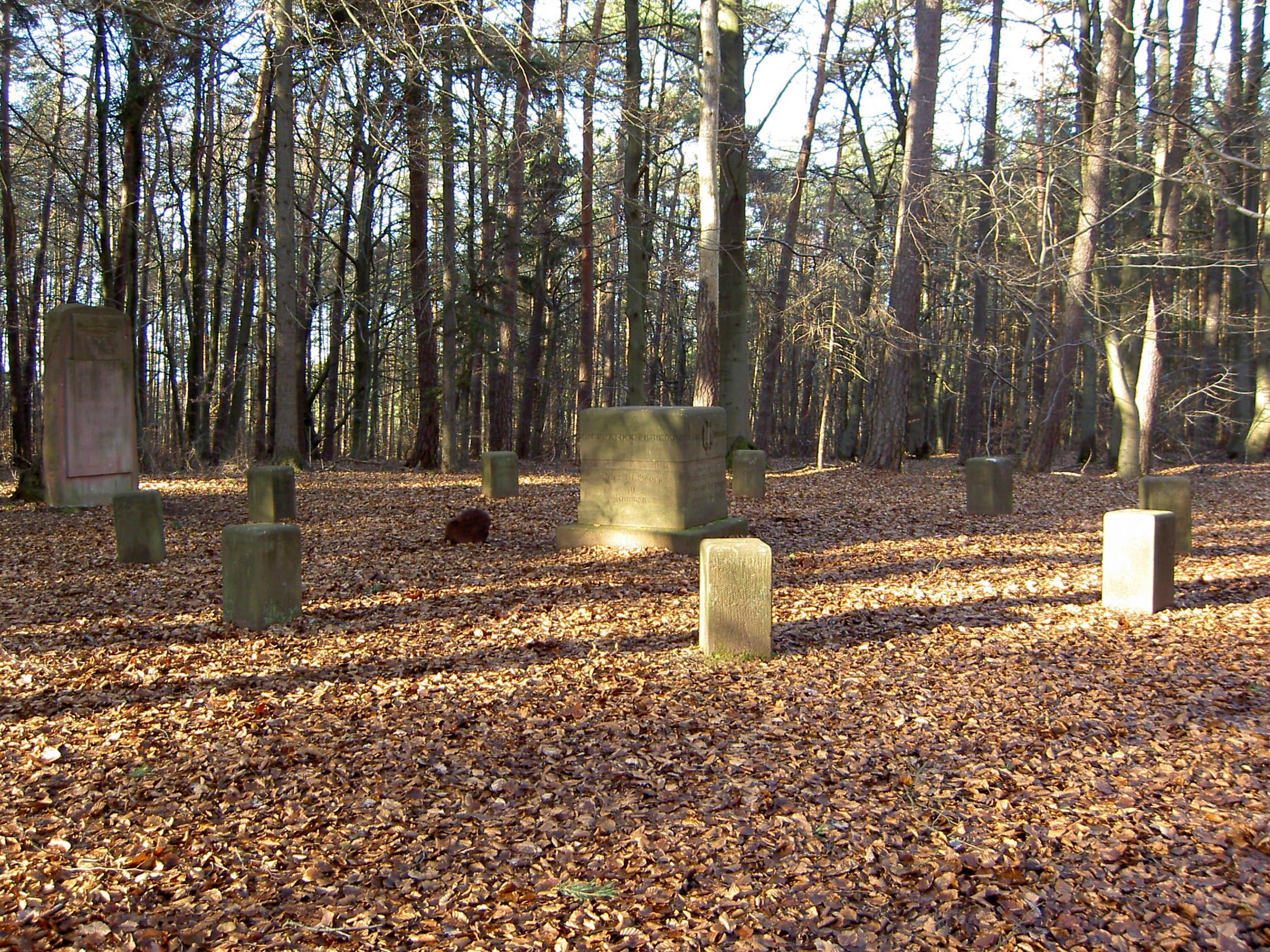
The Stumpfwaldgericht near Alsenborn

Timber rights in the forest were recorded as early as 1390 in the Stumpfwaldweistum. They not only survived the Late Middle Ages, but also major changes of lordship in the centuries that followed. For example, it survived the French Revolution of 1797, the transfer of the forest to the national territory of France, the final defeat of Napoleon and, in 1816, its transfer to the Kingdom of Bavaria. These rights continued even to the present day.

In particular, the inhabitants of the "nine marches" (Neunmärker) - the nine settlements whose territories bordered on the Rhine in succession - were allowed to obtain building timber from the Stumpfwald. These were the village of Mertesheim, the town of Grünstadt, and the villages of Asselheim, Mülheim, Albsheim, Heidenheim, Colgenstein, Obrigheim and Obersülzen. Other holders of such rights were the inhabitants of Ramsen, Hettenleidelheim, Eisenberg and Stauf, because these communities belonged to Ramsen Abbey or the Barony of Stauf, who shared ownership of the Stumpfwald. The villagers of Wattenheim only had logging rights if they could claim ownership of an ox and cart.

The French nation, the Kingdom of Bavaria and the Federal Republic of Germany tried repeatedly, but in vain, to secure ownership of the Stumpfwald. Most recently, in 1989, the Association of Municipalities with Rights in the Stumpfwald (Nine Marches) (Zweckverband der am Stumpfwald berechtigten Gemeinden (Neunmärkerei)), which was founded after the Second World War, won a legal dispute against the state of Rhineland-Palatinate and was paid DM 420,000 in forestry income. When the municipality of Wattenheim demanded their share, the Nine Marches initially wanted a legal ruling as to whether logging using tractors instead of draught animals actually came under the old Weistum rights. In 1990 a settlement was reached that allowed Wattenheim to receive its dues, but left open the issue of draught animals versus motorized tractor units.

== Sights ==
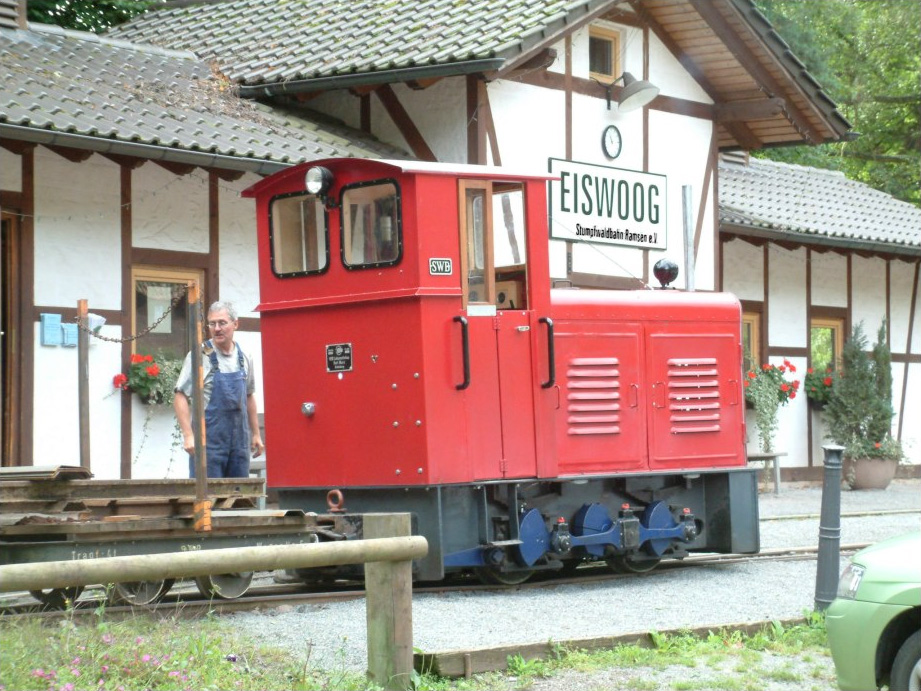
The Stumpfwald Railway at Eiswoog station

Sights in the Stumpfwald include the Stumpfwald Railway heritage line, the three bridges on the regional Eis Valley Railway, the Eiswoog reservoir and the Stumpfwaldgericht thingstead site.

== Literature ==
- Hans Feßmeyer (1956), Der Stumpfwald bei Ramsen (in German) (1st ed.), Ramsen (2nd Revised Edition, edited by Manfred Stumpf. Ramsen 1999)
- Dorothee Rüttger-Mickley (1992), "Die "Neunmärker" und der "Stumpfwald" : Kein Holzrecht ohne "mene" oder Altes Recht in neuer Zeit", Heimatjahrbuch des Landkreises Bad Dürkheim (in German), vol. 10, pp. 269–271
