= Eisbach (Rhine) =

River in Germany

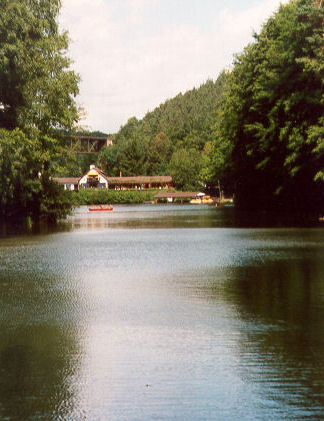
- Eiswoog reservoir; at the far end the hotel on top of the Eiswoog dam can be seen; above the hotel, a section of the Eisbach Valley Viaduct is visible

Location
- Country: Germany
- State: Rhineland-Palatinate

Physical characteristics
- Source
  - location: Hohe Bühl near Ramsen,
  - coordinates: 49°29′54.11″N 7°59′10.00″E
  - elevation: 284 m (932 ft)
- Mouth
  - location: Confluence with Rhine at Worms,
  - coordinates: 49°37′23.16″N 8°22′54.94″E
  - elevation: 89 m (292 ft)
- Length: 38.2 km (23.7 mi)

Basin features
- Progression: Rhine→ North Sea
- Tributaries
  - left: Rodenbach
  - right: Bockbach, Seltenbach

The Eisbach (German pronunciation: [ˈaɪsbax]), locally known as die Eis, is a 38-kilometre (24 mi) long river and left or western tributary of the Rhine in the northeastern Palatinate and southeastern Rhenish Hesse, in the German state of Rhineland-Palatinate.

== Course ==
The largest of the seven springs of the Eisbach is at an elevation of about 290 metres (950 ft) above sea level on the northern slope of the Hohe Bühl mountain, 443 metres (1,453 ft), in the northern Palatinate Forest, southwest of Ramsen. After about two kilometres, the seven streams unite in the Eiswoog reservoir. At the hamlet of Kleehof, the 3.5-kilometre (2.2 mi) long Bockbach flows in from the right. Here, the direction of the river changes from straight north to northeast. The direction remains northeast until the confluence with the Rhine.

The river then flows past Ramsen and Eisenberg. Below Ebertsheim, it receives the 5-kilometre (3.1 mi) long Seltenbach from the right and a few metres further, its largest tributary, the Rodenbach from the left. At Asselheim, a ward of Grünstadt, the Eisbach reaches the Upper Rhine Valley. It then flows through the wards of Albsheim, Mühlheim and Colgenstein, then Obrigheim itself and finally the hamlet of Neuoffstein. Here, it receives up to 350 cubic metres (12,000 ft^{3}) per work day of waste water from the sugar beet processing plant Südzucker-Werk Offstein.

At Offstein, it crosses the border into Rhenish Hesse. It then flows past some southwestern and southern wards of Worms, viz. Heppenheim, Horchheim and Weinsheim. Near State Road 523, the Mariamünsterbach branches off. During the Middle Ages, this stream provided the tanning and dyeing industries in Worms with water; in the 19th century it was covered. From this point onwards, the Eisbach is called Altbach ("old brook") and flows south of the Worms city centre, through the Bürgerweide ward. It flows into the Upper Rhine at the southern tip of the Worms marina, at an elevation of 89 metres (292 ft).

== History ==
Etymology research suggests that the syllable Eis in the name of the Eisbach did not refer to the frozen state of water, but was derived Eisen ("iron"), referring to the iron ore that was formerly mined in this region. The name of the town of Eisenberg on the river appears to have the same meaning.

The middle of the Eisbach valley was already being exploited in the Old Stone Age by ice age hunters and gatherers. This is evinced by stone tools from the Middle Stone Age that were discovered in Asselheim. Other finds from Asselheim date to the Late Stone Age and the Mesolithic. But the permanent presence of man in the Eisbach valley began with the population explosion of the New Stone Age. Neolithic settlements were established at the Wormser Adlerberg, in Weinsheim, Horchheim, Wiesoppenheim, Albsheim an der Eis and Asselheim. The Wormser Adlerberg is a small eminence, piled up by the Eisbach, where the high ground which is secure from flooding, reaches right up to the banks of the Rhine. Other similarly favourable sites in Worms itself are the Domberg and the Rheingewann, an alluvial cone at the mouth of the Pfrimm. These bridgeheads offered good crossing sites over the river. The valleys of the Pfrimm and the Eis form natural corridors through the hills and were therefore important east-west routes from the Rhine through the Kaiserslautern Basin to Gaul even in prehistoric times. Its location as a natural communications hub was the reason Worms was founded. "Of all the streams that empty into the Rhine north and south of Worms, only the Pfrimm and the Eis were of any great importance, because they formed the only riverside high ground suitable for settlements in the Rhine Plain." Although long-distance trade experienced an important upsurge during the Bronze Age, there have been almost no Bronze Age finds in the upper Eis valley. In the Iron Age the upper Eis valley was also settled. Certainly by Roman times, if not before, iron ore was being mined in the area of Ramsen and iron smelting in Eisenberg. In Eisenberg, a Roman vicus grew up with the character of a small industrial town. The important trunk road through the Eisbach valley was fortified in Roman times, but was only classified as a secondary Roman road. In Eisenberg there was a beneficarius station, which underscored the importance of the route. The road along the Pfrimm was however always more important that the one through the Eisbach valley. In Roman times there were numerous Roman estates in the valleys of the Eis and the Pfrimm, which followed one another in quick succession. Roman rule came to an end in the second half of the 5th century. Frankish settlement of the Eisbach valley began in the late 5th century. Almost all the present-day Eisbach villages go back to Frankish settlements that were founded between the end of the 5th century and the 8th century. The road from Metz to Worms via Kaiserslautern through the Eisbach valley played a central role in the settlement. This road increased further in importance during the Merovingian era because it linked Metz, the capital of the eastern part of the empire, Austrasia, with the Upper Rhine region. During the Saxon Wars, Charlemagne used Worms as an assembly area for his troops, because there, near the Palatinate, was sufficient room and plentiful supplies for large armies. Around 900, Eisbach is mentioned in the Wormser wall-building ordinance as one of the places that shared responsibility for maintaining the city wall of Worms.

The water power of the Eisbach was already being used in the Middle Ages to drive water mills, such as the Papiermühle ("Paper Mill") in Quirnheim-Tal, the Krausmühle ("Kraus Mill") and the Schiffermühle ("Boatman's Mill") in Albsheim or the Stegmühle ("Pier Mill") in Offstein. The first record of a mill on the Eisbach dates to the year 766. But even in Roman times water mills were known and were used in the Germanic provincest. There were numerous mills on the Eisbach. Before the town was destroyed in 1689 the stream drove eleven mills alone in Worms itself and within one hour's walk from Worms upstream there were another nineteen mills. The Eisbach was well suited for mills thanks to its very constant flow of water. Even in longer periods of drought, the Eis had sufficient water, unlike its northern neighbour, the Pfrimm.

On the Eisbach grasslands near Heppenheim a king encamped with his army twice during the 13th century. In August 1250, King Conrad IV made his quarters for six days here following the battle against William of Holland. About fifty years later during the dispute over the throne between King Adolphus of Nassau and Duke Albert of Austria the decisive Battle of Göllheim took place. Immediately before the battle King Adolphus camped for several days from 1 July 1298 with his cavalry army near Heppenheim and Wiesoppenheim. Dort fand er für seine Streitmacht, die auf etwa 5.000 Mann - vorwiegend Reiter - geschätzt wird, on the fields by the Eisbach where there was extensive pasture. The Wimpfen Chronicle mentions explicitly the lush meadows near Heppenheim. After King Adolphus had falle in the Battle of Göllheim on 2 July 1298, his victor, Albert of Austria, refused to let him be buried in Speyer Cathedral. So Adolphus' body was initially interred in the Cistercian convent of Rosenthal, which lay left of the Eisbach on its tributary, the Rodenbach. Not until 1309 was his coffin transferred to Speyer. In the cathedral Aldolphus was laid next to his former rival, Albert, who had been murdered in 1308 by his own nephew.

For the city of Worms the Stadt-Eisbach was of great importance, not so much because it provided drinking water - there were numerous wells in the city for that purpose - but because it provided industrial water that was needed by its mills, tanneries and dye works. Whether the Stadtbach already existed in Roman times or was diverted during the Middle Ages from the original course of the Eisbach is still unclear today. In the 19th century the laying out of the Stadtbach was variously ascribed to Charlemagne or Worms Church. The Stadtbach was first mentioned in 1016, when Bishop Burchard gifted three mills near St.Paulus Immediately on the Eisbach, on the Rhine side of the Roman city wall, lay the castle of the Salian dukes of Worms, which was demolished in 1002 in order to build St. Paul's on the same spot. The castle, "one of the oldest in the Rhenish-Hesse-Palatine region", was supposed to be very heavily fortified. This strongly suggests that it may have been a water castle, although there cannot have been a moat on its eastern side. On the site of the castle there had previously been a Late Roman fortification dating to the 4th century, probably a castell for the protection of the Roman harbour that lay outside the walls. Sovereign rights over the Stadtbach belonged in the High Middle Ages to the Bishop. In the late 12th century the Stadtbach was owned in equal thirds by the churches of St.Paul, St.Martin and by several citizens of Worms who, sometime between 1198 and 1217, sold their share to Nonnenmünster Abbey (the Maria-Münster). The city council tried in the 14th century to gain sole rights over the Eisbach and in 1315 obtained a privilege from King Louis of Bavaria, that the diversion of streams within the city would attract a heavy fine. In 1381, the city obtained a further privilege from King Wenzel, whereby it was given the rights over all the streams that flowed through the city and its suburbs. If the city felt its use of the waters of the Eisbach was restricted they even used force. In 1443 for example, the citizens of Worms destroyed the water channel in Heppenheim. Interfering with the Stadtbach was a good way for its opponents to damage the city. In 1483, during the dispute between Elector Philip and Worms the Eisbach was sabotaged, likewise in 1516 Francis of Sickingen diverted the Stadtbach during his siege of Worms. Even the residents of Horchheim sabotaged the Eisbach several times in their dispute with the city.

== Sights ==
=== Eis valley ===
Eiswoog

Southwest of the municipality of Ramsen the Eisbach is impounded to create the Eiswoog. There is a hotel-restaurant on the dam; below it are managed fish ponds. A three-kilometre-long path runs around the lake. In the Eiswoog itself are brown trout, perch, northern pike and brook trout. Because the lake is privately owned, fishing is forbidden. The strictly protected kingfisher nests by the lake. The wheatear, which is very rare in Germany and was placed on the IUCN Red List of endangered species in 2008, was registered as a migrant here.

Railway bridges

Of technological interest in the Eis valley are the bridges of the regional Eis Valley Railway:

- The Eis Valley Viaduct, finished in 1932 and used until 1988, has a height of 35 metres (115 ft) and, with a length of 250 metres (820 ft), is the longest railway bridge in the Palatinate.
- The Bockbach Viaduct over the Bockbach stream was built at a cost of 375,000 RM and is 28.50 metres (93.5 ft) high and 170 metres (560 ft) long.
- The Dreibrunnen Viaduct, built at a cost of 245,000 RM, is 23 metres (75 ft) high and was made using a single arch without any intermediate piers.

Stumpfwald Railway

Die Stumpfwald Railway, a heritage narrow gauge railway (600 mm) with open wagons, runs at certain times as a tourist attraction between Ramsen and the Eiswoog. Its night-time "torchlight services" are especially popular.

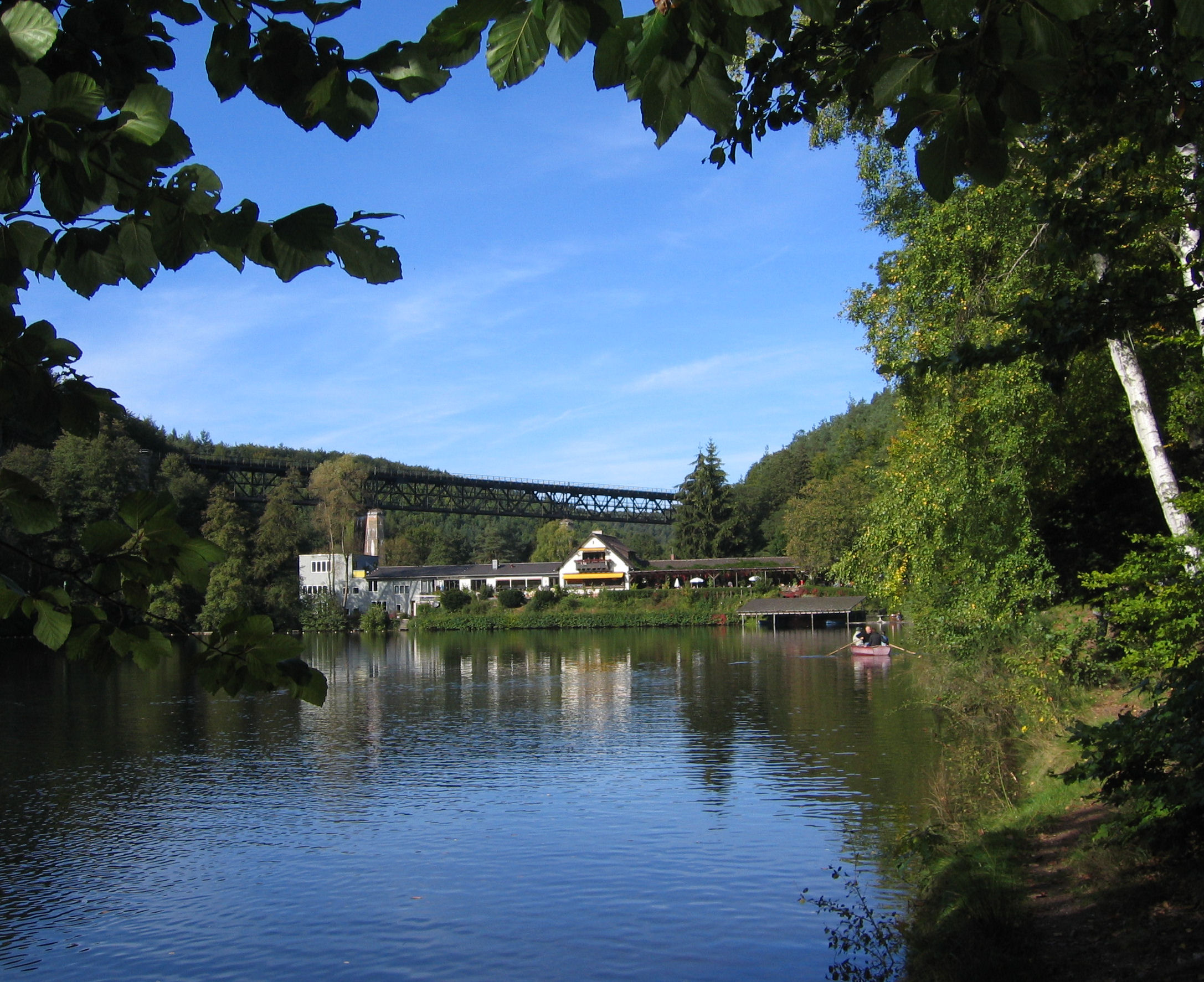
Panorama by the Eiswoog

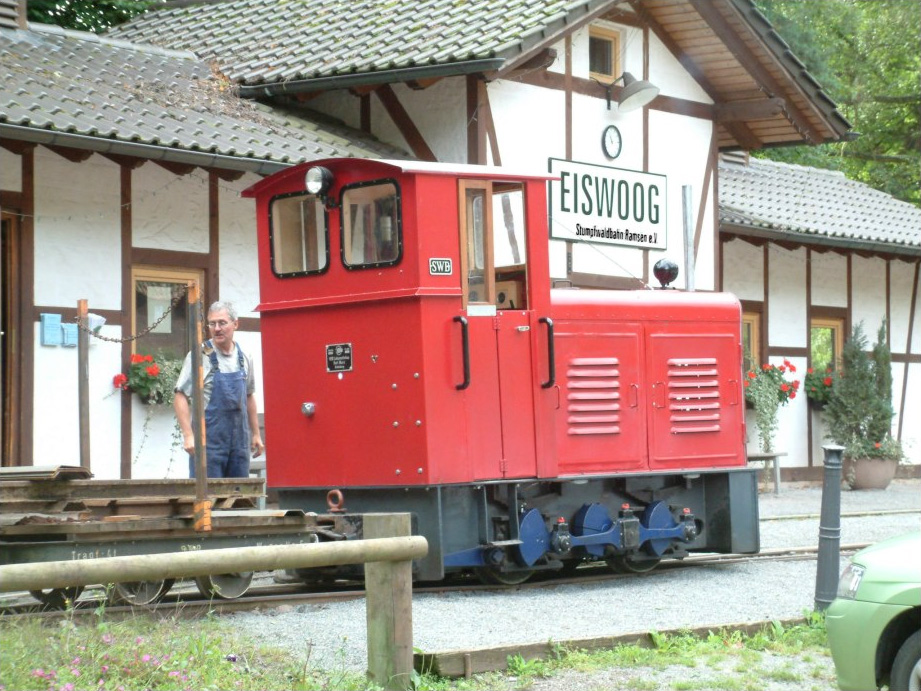
The Stumpfwald Railway

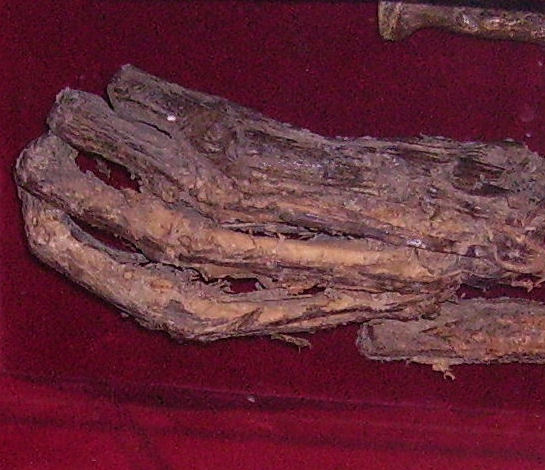
The "incorruptible hand"

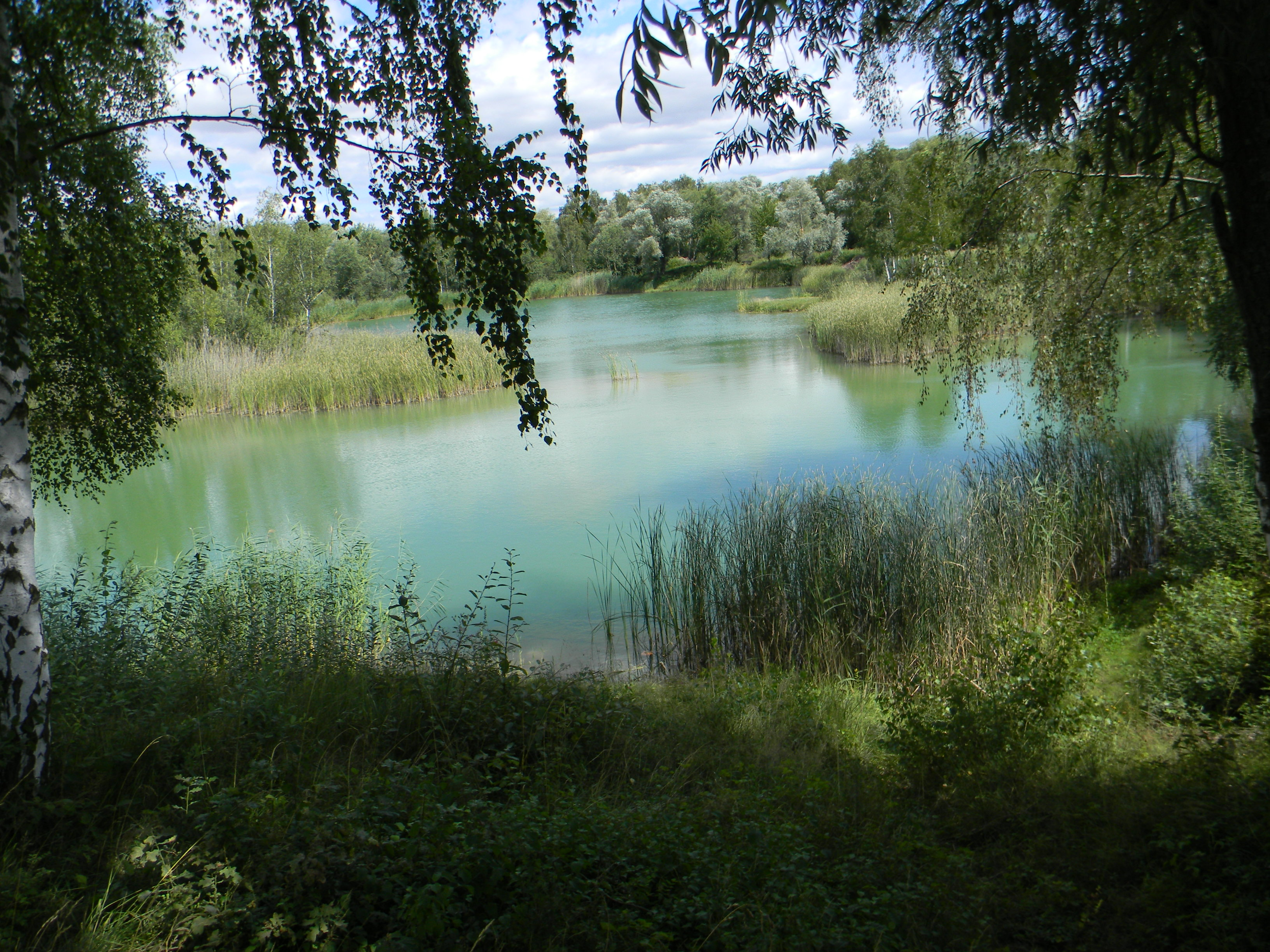
Erdekaut protected area

The "incorruptible hand"

The so-called "incorruptible hand" is displayed in a showcase in the Protestant church at Eisenberg. The hand is linked to a legend about a false oath.

Erdekaut

The Erdekaut Adventure Park between Eisenberg and Hettenleidelheim is a protected area on the site of an old clay pit. In a historic building in the centre the only preserved pit, the Grube Riegelstein, is run as a mining museum.

Day of Action

Every year at the beginning of October, usually on German Unity Day, the Car-Free Eis Valley Day of Action (Aktionstag Autofreies Eistal) attracts numerous visitors to the region. The state road, the Landesstraße 395, which runs through the valley from Grünstadt-Asselheim to Enkenbach, is closed for a whole Sunday to all motor traffice and is reserved exclusively for walkers, usually hikers, cyclists and inline skaters.

== Gallery ==
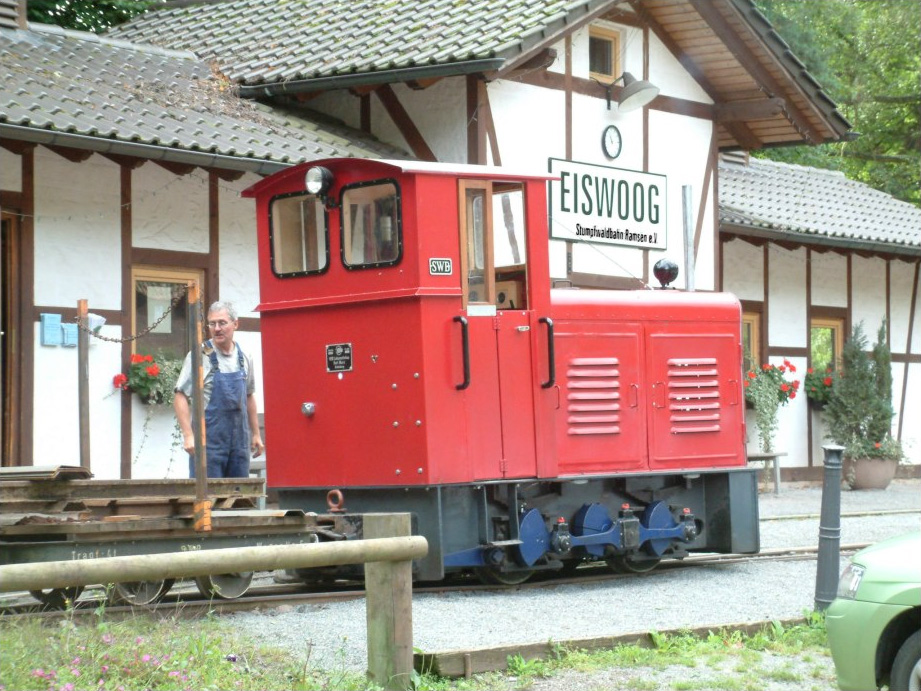
Stumpfwald Heritage Railway

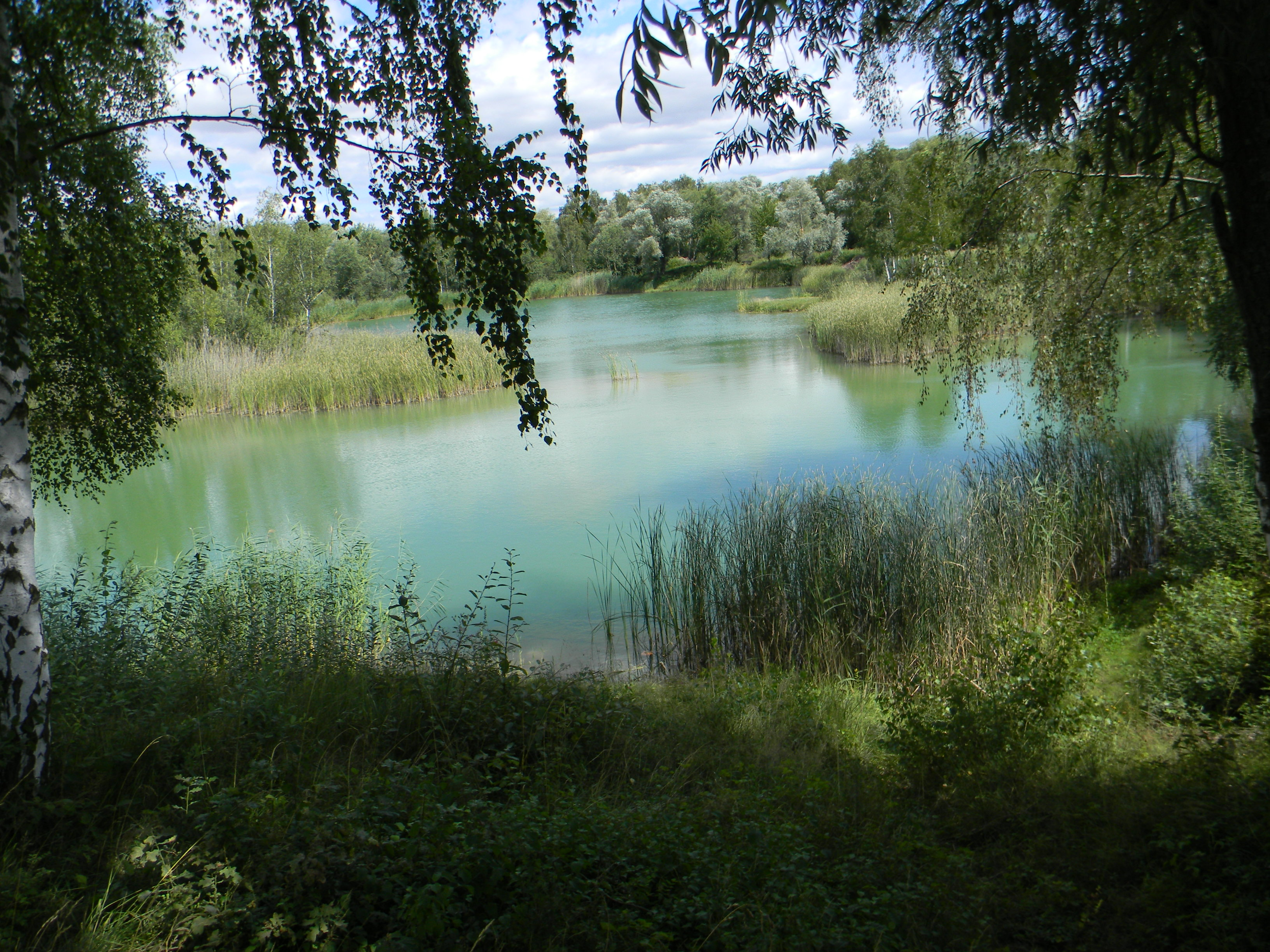
Nature reserve Erdekaut
