= Seltenbach (Eisbach) =

River in Germany

Location
- Location: Germany Rhineland-Palatinate Palatine Forest
- Reference no.: DE: 239184

Physical characteristics
- Source
  - location: On the Kleiner Donnersberg near the Nackterhof
  - coordinates: 49°31′54″N 8°05′20″E
  - elevation: ca. 282 m above sea level (NHN)
- Mouth
  - location: In Ebertsheim from the right into the Eisbach
  - coordinates: 49°34′03″N 8°06′50″E
  - elevation: ca. 160 m above sea level (NHN)
- Length: 5.41 km (3.36 mi)
- Basin size: 15.833 km^{2} (6.113 sq mi)

Basin features
- Progression: Eisbach→ Rhine→ North Sea
- Landmarks: Villages: Hettenleidelheim, Ebertsheim

The Seltenbach is a 5.3-kilometre-long (3.3 mi) stream and an orographically right-hand tributary of the Eisbach in the northeastern part of the Palatine Forest in the German state of Rhineland-Palatinate.

== Course ==
The Seltenbach rises at a height of about 282 m above sea level (NHN) northwest of the hamlet of the Nackterhof which belongs to the municipality of Neuleiningen. The source on the northwestern slope of a 320 m-high hill, called the Kleiner Donnersberg, lies on the territory of the municipality of Hettenleidelheim. The stream initially flows in a north-northwesterly direction along the B 47 federal highway and enters the eastern edge of the built-up area of Hettenleidelheim, before it bends away to the northeast. In its subsequent course it draws closer and closer to the Eisbach and finally passes through the southeastern part of Ebertsheim. East of the village itself the Seltenbach empties into the Eisbach from the right at a height of about 160 m. A few metres below are the mouths of the Rodenbach and the Quirnheimer Bach.

Between Ebertsheim and Hettenleidelheim the Ebertsheim–Hettenleidelheim railway used to run parallel to the Seltenbach.

== See also ==
- List of rivers of Rhineland-Palatinate
