= Diemerstein Forest =

Forest in Rhineland-Palatinate, Germany

Coordinates: 49.467°N 7.977°E

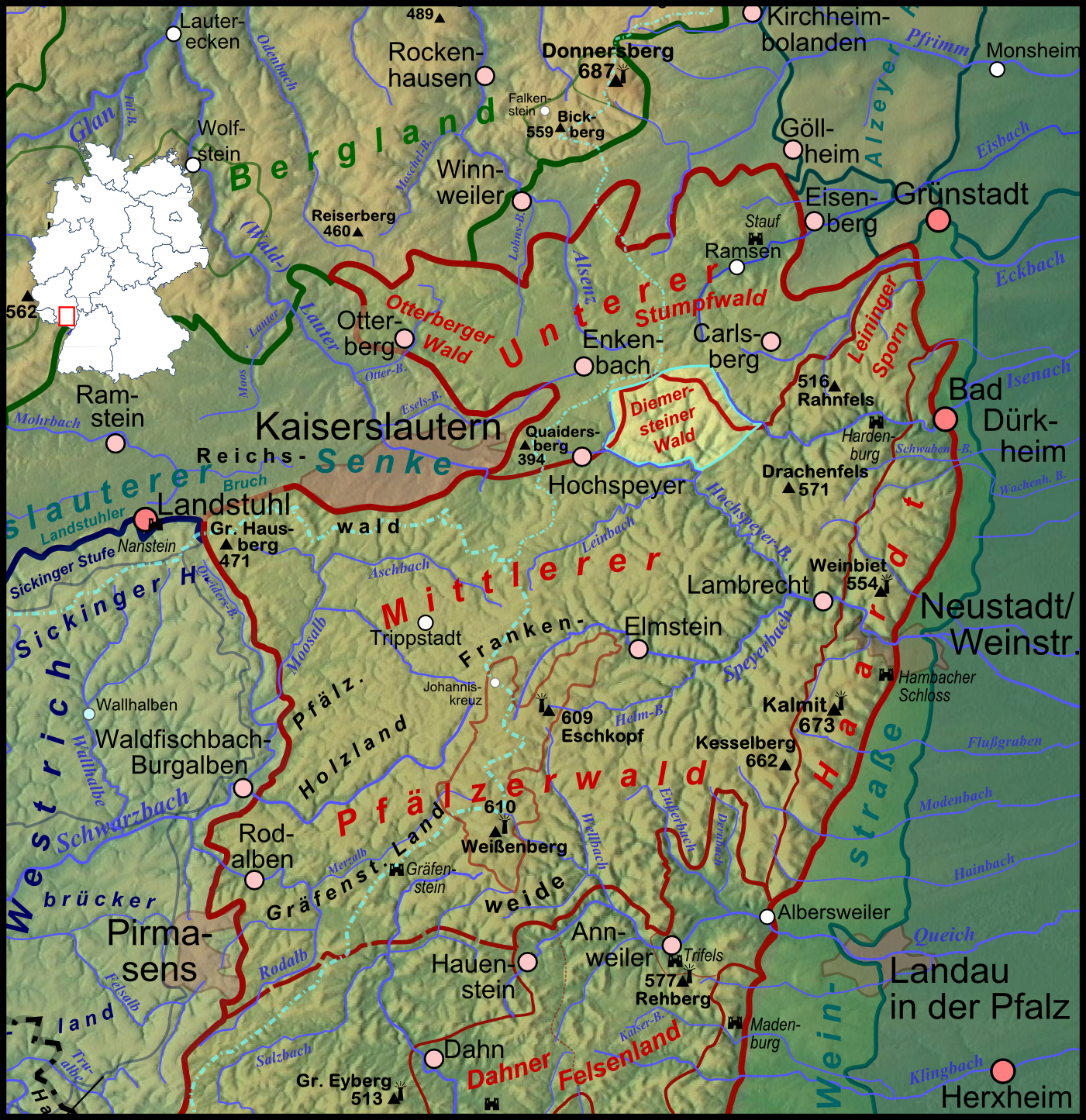
Diemerstein Forest (orange) within the Palatine Forest

Diemerstein Forest (German: Diemersteiner Wald) is a part of the Palatine Forest, a mountainous region within the German state of Rhineland-Palatinate. It has an area of about 50 km^{2}.

== Geography ==
The Diemerstein Forest lies in the north of the Palatine Forest, north of the hamlet of Diemerstein, which belongs to the municipality of Frankenstein (Enkenbach-Alsenborn collective municipality, Kaiserslautern district). The Autobahn 6 motorway from Saarbrücken to Mannheim runs for just under 10 km through the northern part of the forest, reaching its highest point at 403 metres above sea level (NN) for this section.

The forest is bounded roughly by the B 37 federal highway from Kaiserslautern to Bad Dürkheim in the south, by the B 48 from Rockenhausen to Annweiler in the west and by the Landesstraße 395 state road, that links Enkenbach-Alsenborn and Grünstadt, in the north. In the east near Carlsberg the Diemerstein Forest has not visible boundary with other parts of the Palatine Forest. The settlements of Hochspeyer in the southwest, Enkenbach-Alsenborn in the northwest and Carlsberg in the northeast form a triangle that roughly encloses the Diemerstein Forest.

Elevations generally range between 300 and 450 metres. Amongst the most important hills are the Kieskautberg (461 m), the Krummes Eck (449 m) and die Hohe Bühl (443 m), on which are the sources of both the Eisbach (north flank) and the Isenach (south flank).

The watershed between the northern catchment area of the Eisbach und Eckbach and the southern catchment of the Isenach und Speyerbach (Hochspeyerbach) runs over the Krummes Eck in the west via the Hohe Bühl in the north and the Kieskautberg in the east.

== History ==
Above the hamlet of Diemerstein lie the ruins of the eponymous castle, which is first recorded in 1216. In 1521, during the Reformation period, the knight Ulrich von Hutten lived here. The present Diemerstein Forest is, in large part, identical with the forest estate of the ords of the castle and hence bore their name.
