= Seltenbach =

Seltenbach may refer to the following streams or rivers in Germany:

- Seltenbach (Eisbach), tributary of the River Eisbach in Ebertsheim, county of Bad Dürkheim, Rhineland-Palatinate
- Seltenbach (Main), tributary of the River Main, in Klingenberg am Main, county of Miltenberg, Bavaria
- Seltenbach (Neckar), tributary of the River Neckar, near Obernau, town of Rottenburg am Neckar, county of Tübingen, Baden-Württemberg
