= Hohe Bühl =

- Location within Rhineland-Palatinate

Highest point
- Elevation: 444 m above sea level (NN) (1,457 ft)
- Coordinates: 49°29′46″N 7°59′49″E

Geography
- Location: Rhineland-Palatinate, Germany
- Parent range: Palatine Forest

Geology
- Rock type: Bunter sandstone

The Hohe Bühl is a hill in the northern Palatine Forest in the German state of Rhineland-Palatinate, with a height of 444 m above sea level (NN).

The hill straddles the parishes of Enkenbach-Alsenborn to the west and Carlsberg to the east and there is a small viewing tower at the top of its domed summit. The A 6 motorway from Saarbrücken to Mannheim runs past the top of the hill just to the south; this is the highest point on the motorway. The Eisbach river, a tributary of the Rhine, rises on the northern slopes of the mountain at a height of about 290 m above NN. Two kilometres downstream it is impounded to form the Eiswoog lake.
