= Ebertsheim =

- Municipality
- Coat of arms

- Location of Ebertsheim within Bad Dürkheim district
- Interactive map of Ebertsheim
- Location within Germany Location within Rhineland-Palatinate
- Coordinates: 49°34′06″N 08°06′31″E
- Country: Germany
- State: Rhineland-Palatinate
- District: Bad Dürkheim
- Municipal assoc.: Leiningerland

Government
  - Mayor (2019–24): Bernd Findt

Area
  - Total: 5.29 km^{2} (2.04 sq mi)
- Elevation: 237 m (778 ft)

Population (2025-12-31)
  - Total: 1,324
  - Density: 250/km^{2} (648/sq mi)
- Time zone: UTC+01:00 (CET)
  - Summer (DST): UTC+02:00 (CEST)
- Postal codes: 67280
- Dialling codes: 06359
- Vehicle registration: DÜW
- Website: www.ebertsheim.de

Ebertsheim is an Ortsgemeinde – a municipality belonging to a Verbandsgemeinde, a kind of collective municipality – in the Bad Dürkheim district in Rhineland-Palatinate, Germany.

== Geography ==
=== Location ===
The municipality lies in the northwest of the Rhine-Neckar urban agglomeration. It belongs to the Verbandsgemeinde of Leiningerland, whose seat is in Grünstadt, although that town is itself not in the Verbandsgemeinde. Ebertsheim, with its Ortsbezirk of Rodenbach lies in the historic Leiningerland on the river Eisbach in the eastern Eis valley, just short of where this opens out at the eastern edge of the Palatinate Forest onto the uplands of the Weinstraße region (as distinct from the Deutsche Weinstraße – or German Wine Route – itself) and the Upper Rhine Plain.

== History ==
A Frankish settlement called Eberolfsheim had its first documentary mention in 765 in the Lorsch codex. The first settlements here, however, are considerably older, as witnessed by finds from La Tène times about 500 BC and Roman times about 100 BC. Ebertsheim was held uninterruptedly beginning in the Middle Ages by the Counts of Leiningen. Recalling this today is Leininger Straße (a street). Until 1969, the municipality belonged to the now abolished district of Frankenthal.

On 7 July 1969, within the framework of the administrative reform in Rhineland-Palatinate, the small municipality of Rodenbach, which until then had belonged to the neighbouring, and now likewise abolished district of Kirchheimbolanden, and the considerably bigger centre of Ebertsheim were merged to form today's municipality. The name Rodenbach is still used in village life to tag sites or clubs. In 2018, the municipality became a constituent part of the new Verbandsgemeinde of Leiningerland. The district administration designated Rodenbach as an Ortsbezirk in 2006, giving it the right to document this status on the placename sign and to elect a local leader (Ortsvorsteher) and a deputy.

In 1996, the Pennsylvania German and Palatine newspaper Hiwwe wie Driwwe was founded in Ebertsheim by Dr. Michael Werner. It was published in the village until 2000, when the local Private Archive of Pennsylvania German Literature was moved to Ober-Olm.

In August 2009, a runaway Red-necked Wallaby made headlines when it was first spotted within Ebertsheim's limits and later also photographed.

=== Religion ===
In 2007, 49.5% of the inhabitants were Evangelical and 27.6% Catholic. The rest belonged to other faiths, or practised none.

== Politics ==
=== Municipal council ===
The council is made up of 16 council members, who were elected at the municipal election held on 7 June 2009, and the honorary mayor as chairman.

The municipal election held on 7 June 2009 yielded the following result:

	SPD	CDU	FWG	Total
2009	4	5	7	16 seats
2004	7	7	2	16 seats

=== Coat of arms ===
The German blazon reads: In Grün zwei schräggekreuzte goldene Schippen mit abwärts gekehrten silbernen Schaufeln mit viereckigen Handgriffen oben am Stil, überdeckt von einem goldenen Pickel mit gesenktem silbernen Eisen.

The municipality's arms might in English heraldic language be described thus: Vert two shovels in saltire argent helved Or, with rectangular handles to chief, surmounting them in pale a pickaxe of the second helved of the third, the helve to chief.

The arms were approved by the Bavarian ministry of the interior in 1926 and go back to a court seal from 1724.

== Culture and sightseeing ==
=== Evangelische Kirche Ebertsheim ===
Today's Ebertsheim Evangelical Church, built in the 12th century as “Saint Stephen’s” (St. Stephan), is among the oldest in the Palatinate. After the Reformation, it passed to the Protestants, but until 1914 was used as a simultaneous church. Three of the tower's floors and the nave are still Romanesque; the uppermost of the tower's floors, bearing rectangular sound openings, was added later. Next to the south portal is found, scratched into a sandstone quarrystone, a Late Gothic sundial. Inside hangs the picture “Martin Luther mit Schwan” (“Martin Luther with Swan”) by Ebertsheim painter Johann Adam Schlesinger.

=== Evangelische Kirche Rodenbach ===
The Rodenbach Evangelical Church was built in the 11th or 12th century as Saint Bridget's (St. Brigitta) and is thereby older than the church in Ebertsheim. It, too, was yielded to the Protestants after the Reformation, but there was no simultaneum. In 1508, the defensive tower was converted, and in 1684 the nave. On three of the tower's sides, stone sculptures of animal and human heads are set into the wall. It is unclear whether these were meant to ward off evil or were simply bits of older buildings – spolia – used in this structure. On the tower's east side is a Romanesque relief, which is believed to have been created as early as the beginning.

== Economy and infrastructure ==
=== Transport ===
The Landesstraße (state road) 395 (Grünstadt–Enkenbach), links Ebertsheim with Grünstadt's outlying centre of Asselheim and Bundesstraße 271. The A 6 motorway can be reached via the Grünstadt or Wattenheim interchange, and the A 63 via the Dreisen/Göllheim interchange. This puts Kaiserslautern or Mannheim only about 30 minutes away by car; the state capital, Mainz, is, thanks to the new bypass at Eisenberg, about 35 minutes away.

The Ebertsheim halt lies on the Eis Valley Railway from Grünstadt to Ramsen, and is served by scheduled Regionalbahn trains. Public transport is integrated into the Verkehrsverbund Rhein-Neckar (VRN), whose tariffs apply.

The nearest small airport is found in Quirnheim, roughly 3 km away. Here, gliders and small motorized aircraft with outlanding approval may land.

=== Tourism ===
==== “Hab-8-Weg” ====
Ebertsheim advertises with the slogan das Dorf im Grünen (“The Village in the Green”). Its environs await with lands that are not too steep, offering themselves up for hiking in nature. Signed specially fir this is the Hab-8-Weg, at whose starting point is found a Kneipp hand basin. The birdlife conservation area on the municipality's outskirts likewise lends itself to natural adventure.

==== Aktionstag „Autofreies Eistal“ ====
The “Car-free Eis Valley Action Day” – each year in early October, and as a rule around German Unity Day – lures many visitors to the region. For this event, the L 395 is closed to all motorized traffic for a whole day and made available exclusively to pedestrians, as a rule hikers, as well as skaters and cyclists. As an outing destination, there are the Eiswoog, a 6 ha lake with a wealth of birdlife, the Eis Valley Railway with its imposing bridges and the museum railway, the Stumpfwald Railway. The Eisenberg Erdekaut adventure area lies some 2 km away.

== Sons and daughters of the town ==
- Johann Adam Schlesinger (1759–1829), painter
- Karl Fittler (1892–1966), politician (SPD)
- Dr. Michael Werner (1965-), publisher
