= Wattenheim =

- Municipality
- Coat of arms

- Location of Wattenheim within Bad Dürkheim district
- Interactive map of Wattenheim
- Location within Germany Location within Rhineland-Palatinate
- Coordinates: 49°31′18″N 08°03′42″E
- Country: Germany
- State: Rhineland-Palatinate
- District: Bad Dürkheim
- Municipal assoc.: Leiningerland

Government
  - Mayor (2019–24): Carsten Brauer (CDU)

Area
  - Total: 12.53 km^{2} (4.84 sq mi)
- Elevation: 312 m (1,024 ft)

Population (2025-12-31)
  - Total: 1,679
  - Density: 134.0/km^{2} (347.1/sq mi)
- Time zone: UTC+01:00 (CET)
  - Summer (DST): UTC+02:00 (CEST)
- Postal codes: 67319
- Dialling codes: 06356
- Vehicle registration: DÜW
- Website: www.wattenheim.de

Wattenheim is an Ortsgemeinde – a municipality belonging to a Verbandsgemeinde, a kind of collective municipality – in the Bad Dürkheim district in Rhineland-Palatinate, Germany.

== Geography ==
=== Location ===
Wattenheim lies on a cone-shaped hill with a gentle slope. This village in the Leiningerland – the name for the lands once held by the Counts of Leiningen – is a starting point for long or short hikes. Wattenheim belongs to the Verbandsgemeinde of Leiningerland, whose seat is in Grünstadt. Until 1969 it also belonged to the now abolished district of Frankenthal.

=== Neighbouring municipalities ===
Clockwise from the northeast, these are Hettenleidelheim, Neuleiningen, Altleiningen, Carlsberg, an exclave of Neuleiningen, Bad Dürkheim, Fischbach, Enkenbach-Alsenborn, Ramsen and Eisenberg.

== History ==
Various finds lead to the conclusion that the Romans had already established some kind of settlement in what is now Wattenheim. Wattenheim’s first documentary mention in 793 in the Lorsch codex is said to be disputed. It is believed that the village had its first documentary mention in 1221. In the Middle Ages, Wattenheim belonged to the House of Leiningen. In 1695, it was sold to the Baron of Blumencron.

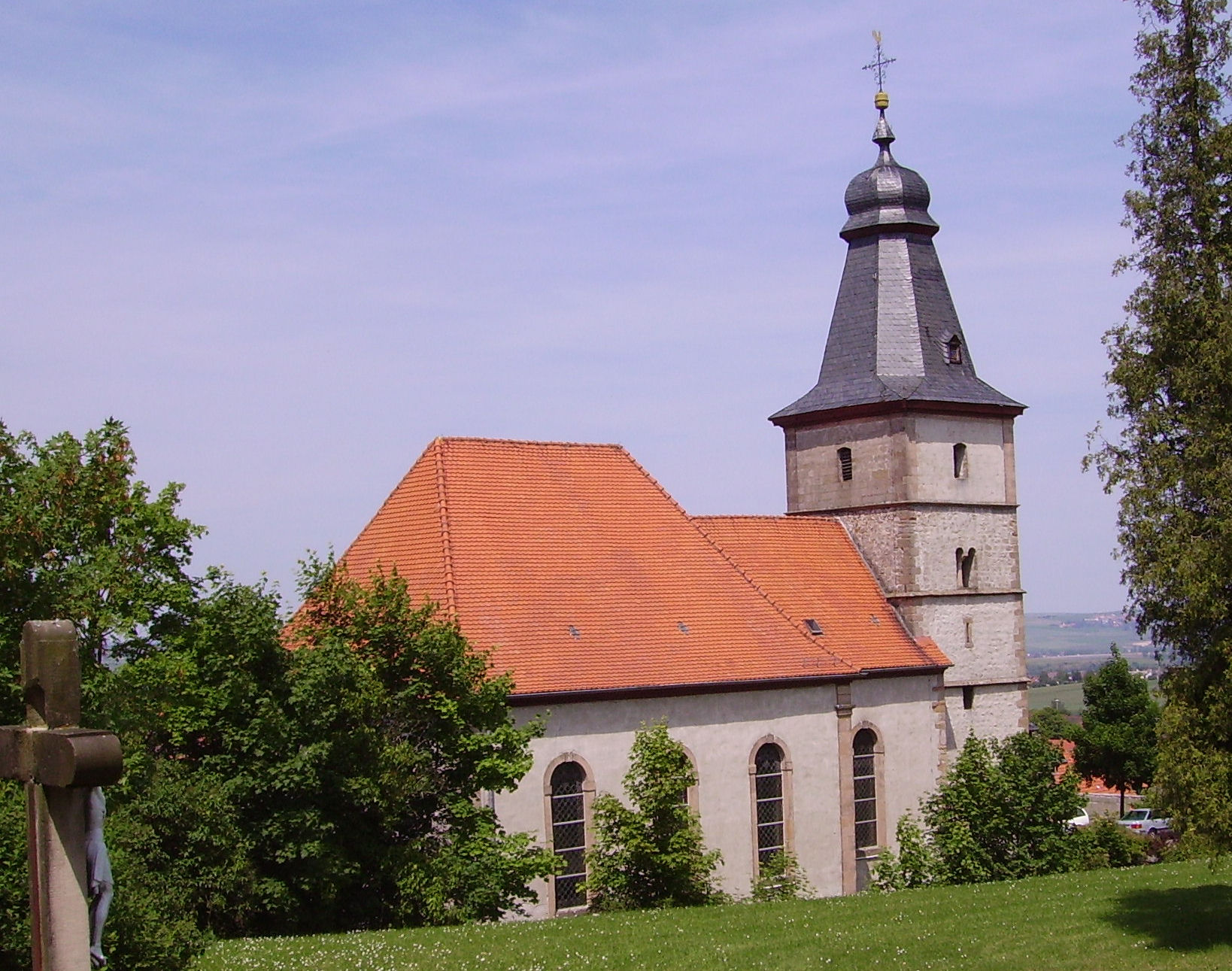
The Evangelical church

=== Religion ===
In 2007, 42.5% of the inhabitants were Evangelical and 35.9% Catholic. The rest belonged to other faiths or adhered to none.

== Politics ==
=== Municipal council ===
The council is made up of 16 council members and the honorary mayor as chairman, who were elected at the municipal election held in a 5-year term.

The municipal election held on 25 May 2014 was sued by two voters. The administrative court of Neustadt an der Weinstraße decided in favor of the voters. The reordered election was stated on 1 March 2015.

	SPD	CDU	FWG	Voters Group Nagel	Total
2015	9	4	1	2	16 seats
2009	6	8	2	-	16 seats
2004	6	8	2	-	16 seats

=== Coat of arms ===
The German blazon reads: Von Rot und Blau gespalten, rechts ein durchgehendes goldenes Kreuz, links ein rotbekleideter Tatar mit goldenbordierter roter Pelzmütze und schwarzen Stiefeln, die Linke in die Hüfte gestützt, in der Rechten ein silbernes Krummschwert mit goldenem Griff schwingend.

The municipality’s arms might in English heraldic language be described thus: Per pale gules a cross Or and azure a Tatar vested of the first wearing a fur cap of the same garnished of the second and boots sable, his sinister hand on his hip, and in his dexter hand a sabre argent and garnished of the second, the point to chief.

The arms were approved in 1958 by the Mainz Ministry of the Interior and date from a 1733 court seal in which the two fields were transposed. The cross is drawn from the arms once borne by the Counts of Leiningen-Westerburg, and the Tatar from those borne by the family Blumencron.

== Culture and sightseeing ==
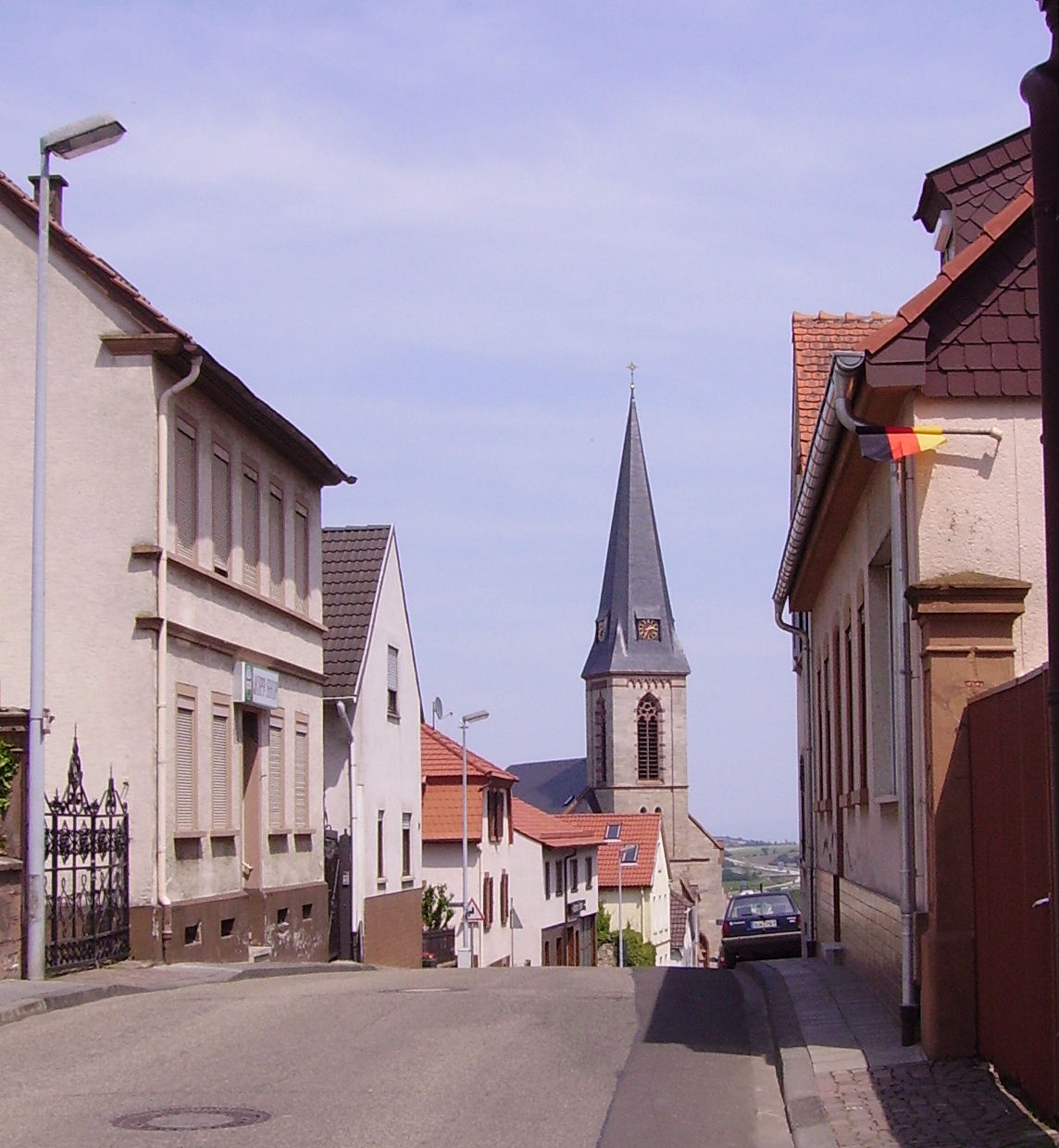
The Catholic Church in the background

The Protestant church’s history dates from the first Crusades. Standing in the village centre is the Catholic church, a Gothic Revival hall church from the years 1892-1893.

== Economy and infrastructure ==
=== Transport ===
Wattenheim is linked to the long-distance road network by Bundesautobahn 6. At the Wattenheim exit is an Autobahn maintenance facility located.

== Famous people ==
=== Sons and daughters of the town ===
- Barbara Pfister (1867–1909), mystic and stigmatic
- Daniel Meininger (1876–1964), publisher
- Karl Dieter (1903–1956), Nazi functionary
