= Stumpfwald Railway =

Coordinates: 49.5298°N 07.9903°E

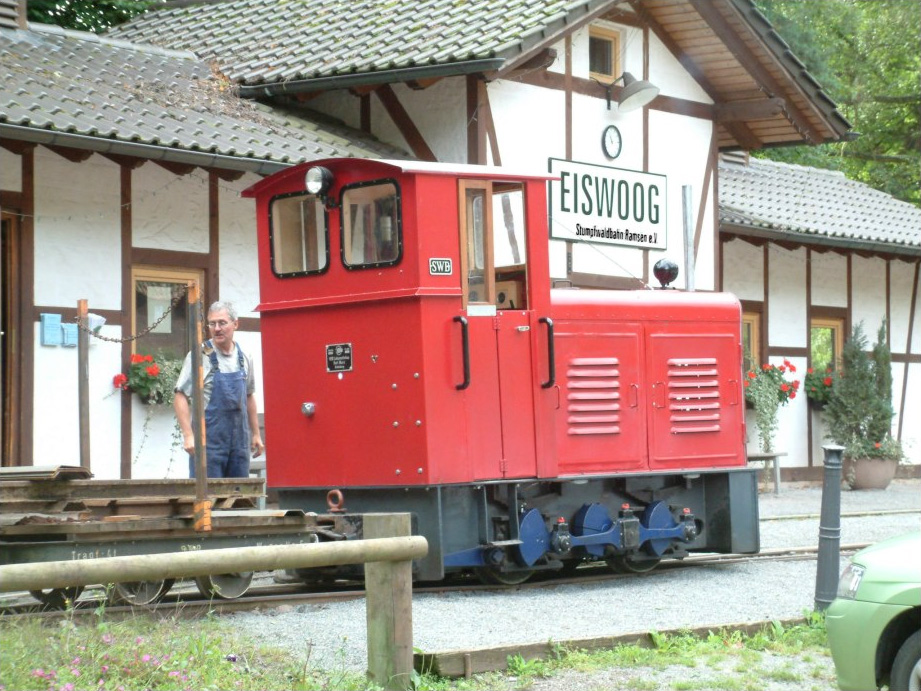
- Diesel locomotive and flat wagon at Eiswoog Halt

Technical
- Line length: 3.5 km
- Track gauge: 600 mm (1 ft 11 5/8 in)

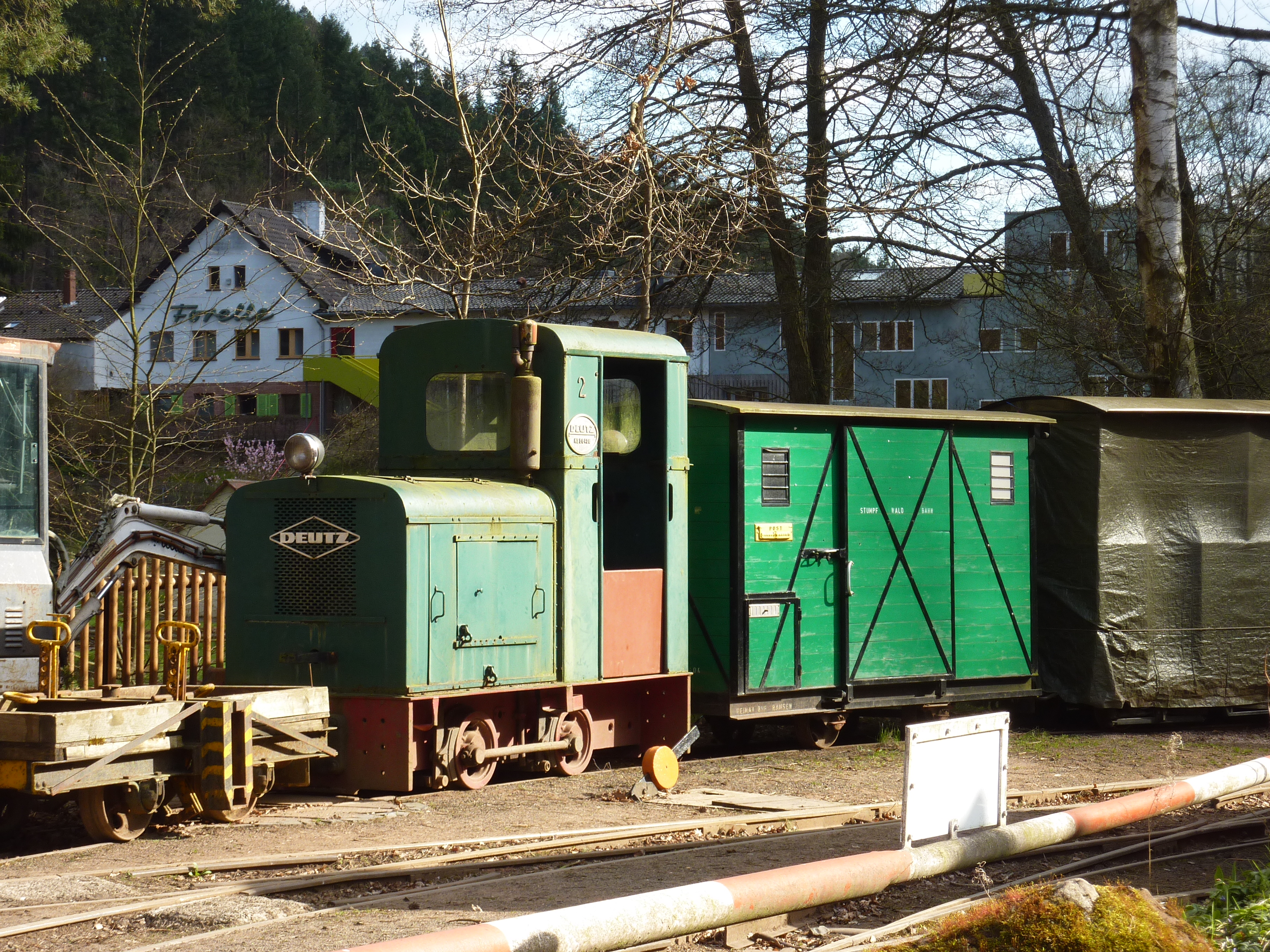
Deutz locomotive originally from Tonwaren-Industrie Wiesloch brickworks with wagons at Eiswoog Halt

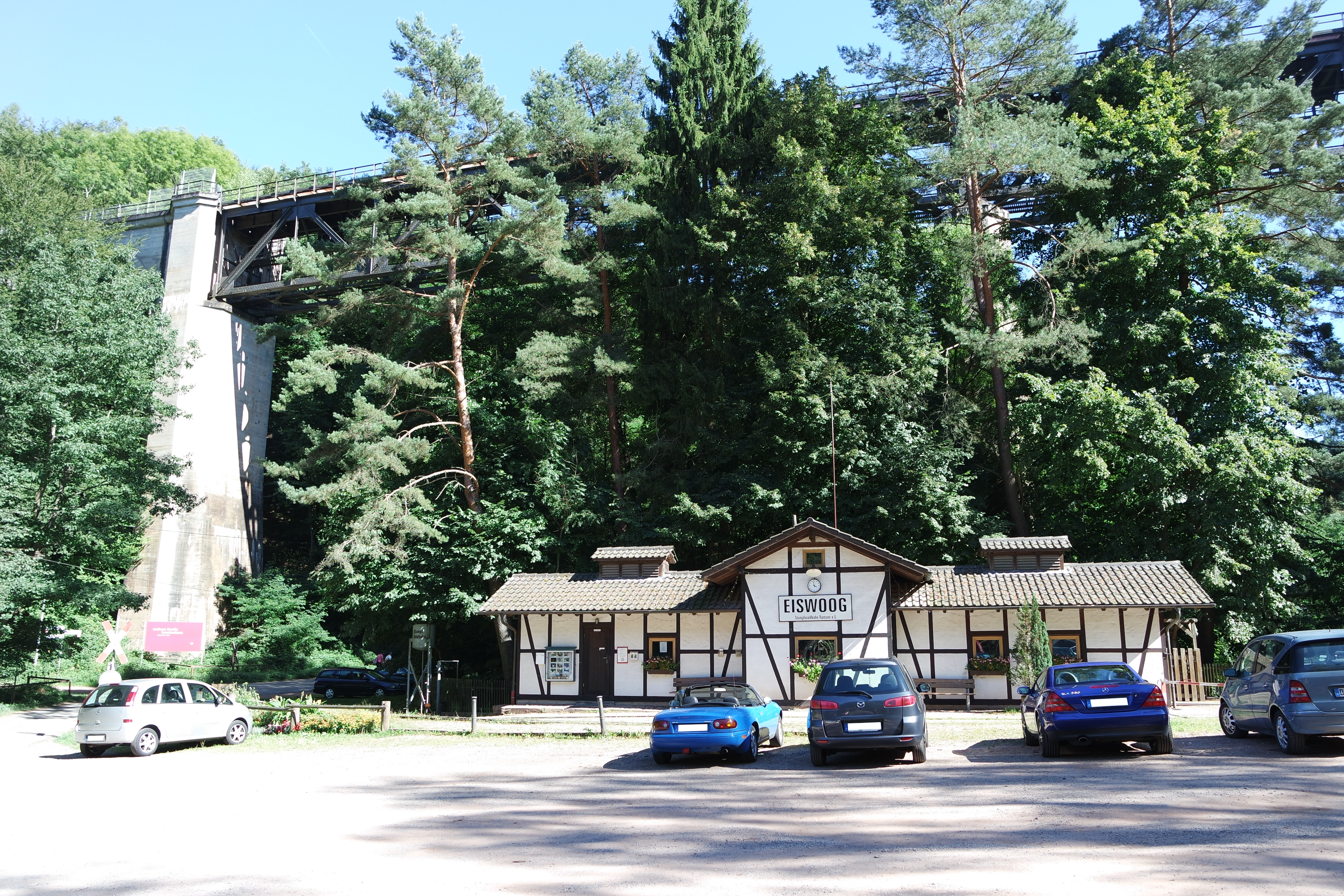
Eiswoog Halt with mainline viaduct above

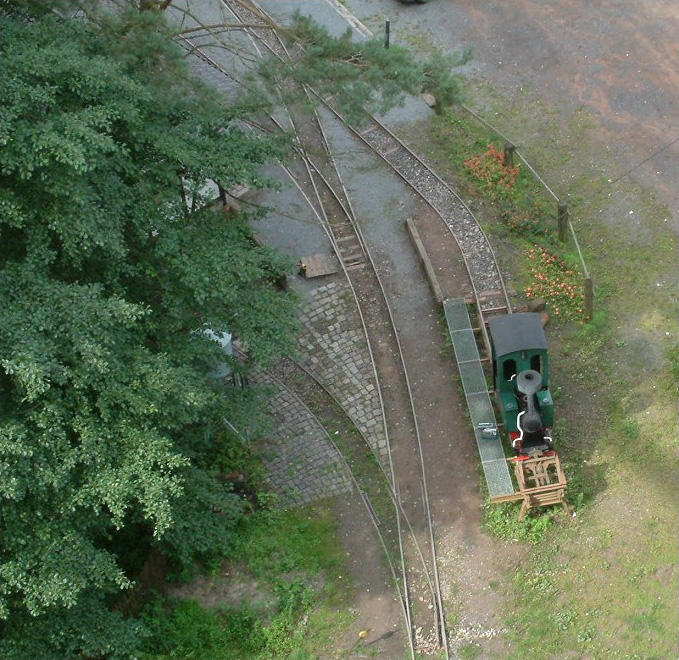
Steam locomotive and part of the marshalling area at Eiswoog

The Stumpfwald Railway (German: Stumpfwaldbahn) is a 600 mm (1 ft 11 5/8 in) narrow gauge heritage railway that has operated since 1996 in the Stumpfwald, a woodland area in the north of the Palatine Forest in the municipality of Ramsen.

== Course ==
The western end of the Stumpfwald Railway starts at Eiswoog railway station, next to the eponymous lake. Some years after the line opened, a railway halt was built on the nearby (standard gauge) Eis Valley Railway, which also bears the name Eiswoog. This halt is served by most of the trains on the Eis Valley Railway on Sundays and holidays. On weekdays, however, services on the Eis Valley line ends in Ramsen.

The original eastern operating point of the Stumpfwald Railway was Bockbachtal station, but this was moved further to the east as part of the extension of the line in 2007 and has been converted to a passing loop, which is now the halfway point on the way to Ramsen. Just before Ramsen are Kleehof station and the Schützenhaus halt. At the terminus of Ramsen West there is also a small engine shed and depot for the Stumpfwald Railway.

About halfway between Bockbachtal station and the terminal stop at Eiswoog is the old passing loop for multiple train operations. On the new section of line towards Ramsen West there is another loop at Kleehof station, which however, like the old loop, is only used when there are high levels of traffic or for slow moving guest vehicles.

== History ==
In the late 1980s the Stumpfwaldbahn Ramsen e. V. society was established with the aim of building and operating a museum Feldbahn railway in the Stumpfwald. For this purpose a timber-framed station building was erected by the car park below the Eiswoog reservoir as the starting point for the line, and the Kleehof marshalling yard constructed in the direction of Ramsen. There, at Bockbachtal station, was the terminus of the Stumpfwald Railway. On 9 September 1996 the line was inaugurated.

In spring 2005 work began on extending the line to the edge of the village of Ramsen. The gap between the old and new sections of line was finally closed on 20 May 2007. The new section to Ramsen was opened on 1 September 2007.

In October 2008 the Stumpfwald Railway was selected to host the International Feldbahn Gathering.

In addition to the aforementioned construction of the depot and associated trackage on the edge of Ramsen, the focus of activity is now in operating, maintaining and renovating additional running and rolling stock.

== Operations ==
The majority of the internal transportation and runs along the Stumpfwald Railway is carried out on the railway itself, both in terms of the transport of material and also maintenance work, which is mainly carried out on Saturdays or on weekends outside the main operating season.

Regular public services take place using covered passenger wagons built by the society specifically for the purpose on the entire length of the line between Ramsen and the Eiswoog. Passengers normally travel in three large carriages that can carry a total of 50 passengers; at peak times they are supplemented by an additional two smaller wagons in a separate train. In addition additional passenger carriages are sometimes available which, e.g. are used for steam services or at big events. All the passenger carriages have twin-axle bogies.

From the end of May to the beginning of October eight pairs of trains runs every Sunday and public holiday. More are laid on for steam services or at peak times. The actual journey time for the whole line is just under 20 minutes. Motive power is provided by several working locomotives, including, at regular intervals, a steam locomotive. The society has a total of three steam and about twelve diesel locomotives, of which however several have to be renovated and/or for which there is no room until the new engine shed is built. The locomotives come mainly from old Feldbahn lines at mines, gravel works, quarries and sawmills.

Since 1998 the Stumpfwald Railway has held a night-time "torch ride" (Fackelfahrt) in the second half of January. Initially the torch ride took place annually, since 2009 it has been conducted every two years.
