= Kieskautberg =

Hill in the Palatine Forest, Germany

- Location within Rhineland-Palatinate

Highest point
- Elevation: 461 m above sea level (1,512 ft)
- Coordinates: 49°28′20″N 8°02′23″E

Geography
- Location: Bad Dürkheim, Rhineland-Palatinate Germany
- Parent range: Palatine Forest

The Kieskautberg is a hill located two kilometres south of the German village of Carlsberg in the east of the Diemerstein Forest, which is part of the northern Palatine Forest.

The boundary between the collective municipalities of Freinsheim (south) and Grünstadt-Land (north) runs over the hill. The hill is covered by mixed forest. Its summit is accessible from Hertlingshausen by a footpath managed by the Palatine Forest Club, which is marked by a red circle.
