= Rodenbach (Eisbach) =

River in Germany

Location
- Country: Germany
- State: Rhineland-Palatinate
- Location: Palatine Forest
- Reference no.: DE: 239186

Physical characteristics
- Source
  - location: West of the Rosenthalerhof
  - coordinates: 49°33′34″N 8°00′09″E
  - elevation: 320 m above sea level (NHN)
- Mouth
  - location: In Ebertsheim from the left into the Eisbach
  - coordinates: 49°34′04″N 8°06′53″E
  - elevation: ca. 160 m above sea level (NHN)
- Length: 9.847 km (6.119 mi)
- Basin size: 19.299 km^{2} (7.451 sq mi)

Basin features
- Progression: Eisbach→ Rhine→ North Sea
- Landmarks: Villages: Kerzenheim, Ebertsheim
- Tributaries
  - left: Kerzenheimer Bach, Stehrbach, Mangelbach
- Waterbodies: Reservoirs: Rosenthaler Weiher

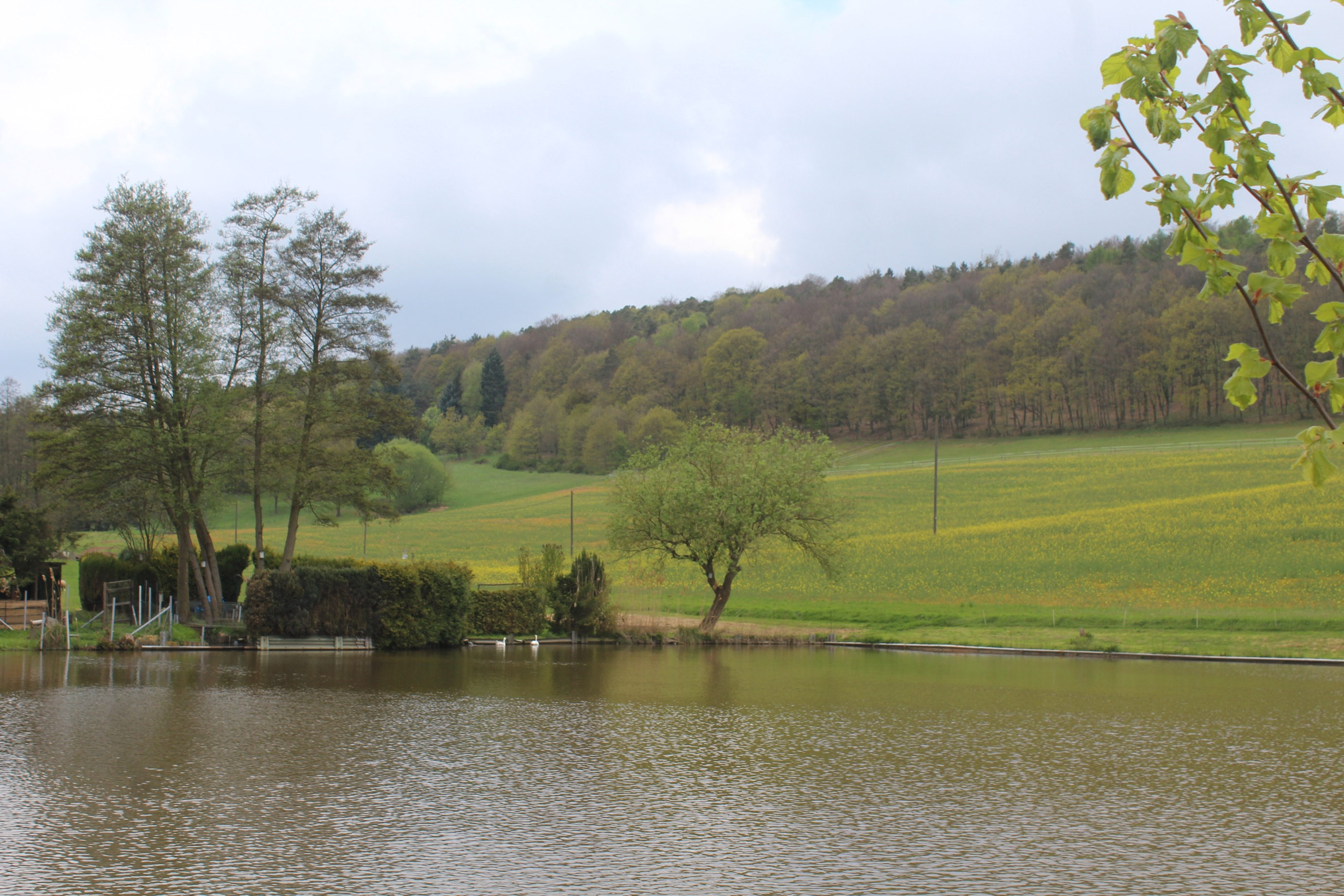
Rosenthal, the monastery pond

The Rodenbach (German pronunciation: [ˈʁoːdn̩bax]) is a stream, just under 10 kilometres (6.2 mi) long, and an orographically left-hand headstream of the Eisbach in the northeastern part of the Palatine Forest in the German state of Rhineland-Palatinate.

== See also ==
- List of rivers of Rhineland-Palatinate
