= Eiswoog =

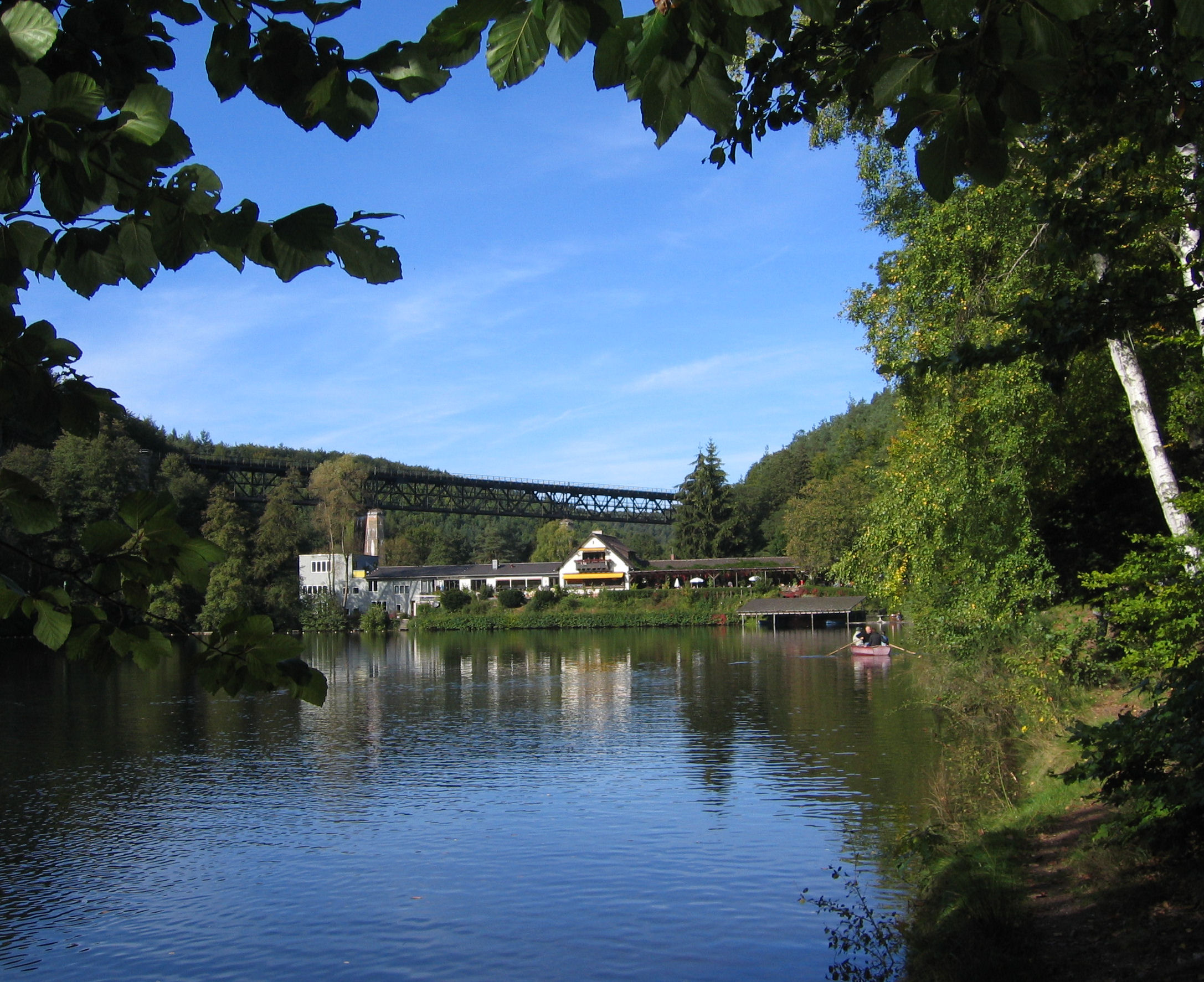
- Front to back: the Eiswoog, the dam and hotel, the Eis Valley Viaduct

- Location within Rhineland-Palatinate
- Location: Rhineland-Palatinate
- Coordinates: 49°30′45″N 7°58′55″E
- Type: Reservoir
- Primary outflows: Eisbach
- Basin countries: Germany
- Surface area: 6 ha (15 acres)
- Surface elevation: 340 m (1,120 ft)

The Eiswoog is a reservoir, roughly six hectares in area, on the Eisbach stream, locally also called die Eis, in the German state of Rhineland-Palatinate. It is oriented from south to north in the water meadows near the source of the stream in part of the northern Palatinate Forest known as the Stumpfwald.

== Geography ==
The Eisbach, a left tributary of the Rhine, is impounded southwest of the village of Ramsen near its seven sources, to form a woog. A woog is the local German name given to natural or artificial lakes in this part of the world that used to act as storage reservoirs for watermills and hammer mills or as assembly points for the rafts of firewood or sawn timber.

The Barbarossa Cycleway and Landesstraße 395 state road, which links Eisenberg in the east with Enkenbach-Alsenborn in the west, run past above the lake to the north. The L 395 goes to the city of Kaiserslautern to the southwest and the town of Grünstadt to the north, about 15 kilometres away.

== Name ==
The name Eiswoog may have two derivations: it probably just means "reservoir of the Eis" (Stausee der Eis); for the stream itself was named after the iron ore (German: Eisenerz) deposits in the region. Several linguistic researchers also suggest that another derivation is possible: Before the introduction of refrigerators by Linde in the 1870s, the reservoir was also used to provide ice. At that time, during the late winter, ice was broken and carried on horse and cart to the ice cellars and ice houses of the breweries and pork butchers in the surrounding area.

== History ==
Originally the Eiswoog was probably a naturally formed lake. It was probably first artificially impounded in the Middle Ages. The Stumpfwald forest and the Eiswoog both belonged to Ramsen Convent, founded in 1146. It is known that the nuns had fish ponds laid out in several valleys in the area. The Eiswoog, too, acted as a fishpond. After the dissolution of the nunnery its estates went to the Prince-Bishopric of Worms and the Counts of Nassau. In the 18th century, the Eiswoog belonged to the lords of Nassau-Weilburg. In 1812 the iron smelter owner, Ludwig Gienanth, bought the now nationalised "Eisenwoog", in order to expand this water reservoir to supply hydropower to his factories on the Eisbach near and in Eisenberg, and also to ensure their continued operation in times of drought. The dam of the Eiswoog was raised and reinforced in the years that followed, which enabled the water surface to be expanded to its present area of roughly 6 ha. On two occasions, severe storms caused the dam to burst. In the night of 12/13 Apr 1819 the dam broke, flooding the village of Ramsen and on 4 Aug 1875, flooding following the rupture of the dam affected Ramsen and the village of Eisenberg on the Eisbach and damaged factories and mills. In 1832 a reservoir keeper's house was built on the north side of the dam and, in 1876, a hunting lodge was built on the dam. The Stumpfwald road running past the Eiswoog, today the L 395, was built in 1839–1843. The Eis Valley Viaduct was completed in 1932. During the shelling of the railway bridge in 1944 the viaduct was only lightly damaged, but the reservoir keeper's house and hunting lodge were destroyed. The Seehaus Forelle hotel-restaurant on the crest of the dam was built in 1950/51 by Ulrich von Gienanth. Around 1900 a fish farm was established below the dam, which now consists of 14 fishponds. The Eiswoog remains in the ownership of the von Gienanth family today.

== Facility ==
=== Commercial use ===
A hotel-restaurant has been built on the dam wall from where rowing boats may be hired. Below the reservoir there are managed fishponds. The Eiswoog itself is also used for fish breeding. In winter it is usually emptied of water so that maintenance may be carried out.

=== Fauna ===
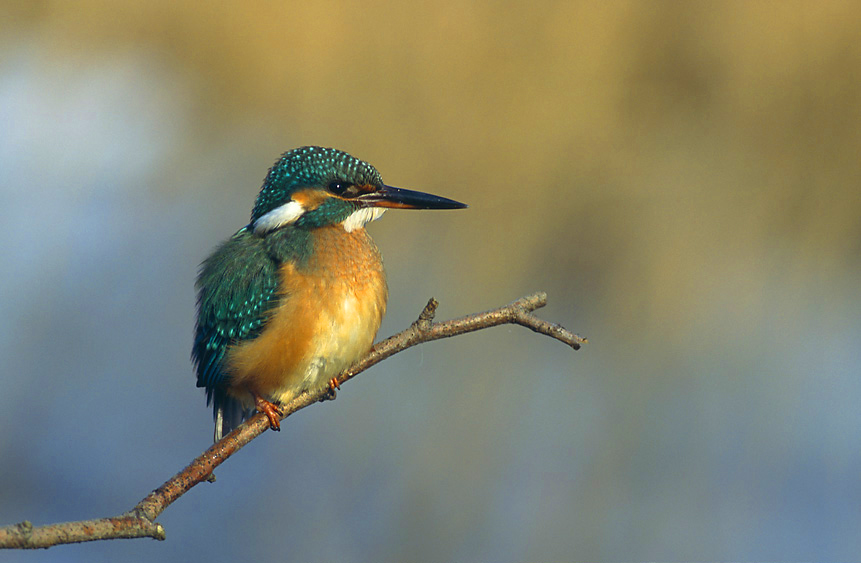
Kingfisher

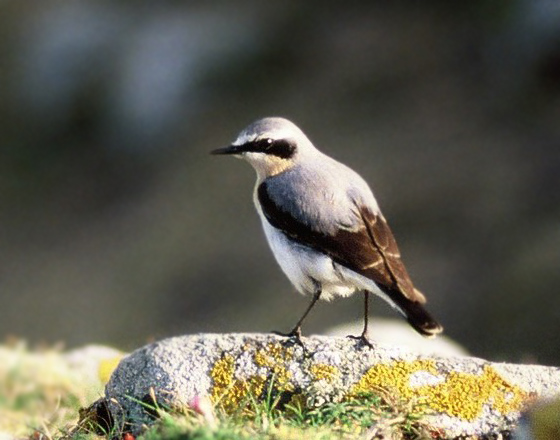
Wheatear

Fish species in the Eiswoog include brown trout, perch, pike and brook trout. The lake is privately owned, so angling is forbidden.

Herons, bitterns, little bitterns, ducks, geese and swans are commonly seen on the Eiswoog. Osprey, on the other hand, are only seen occasionally. One strictly protected species, the kingfisher, nests by the lake. The wheatear, which is rare in Germany, has been registered as a passage migrant.

=== Nature trail ===
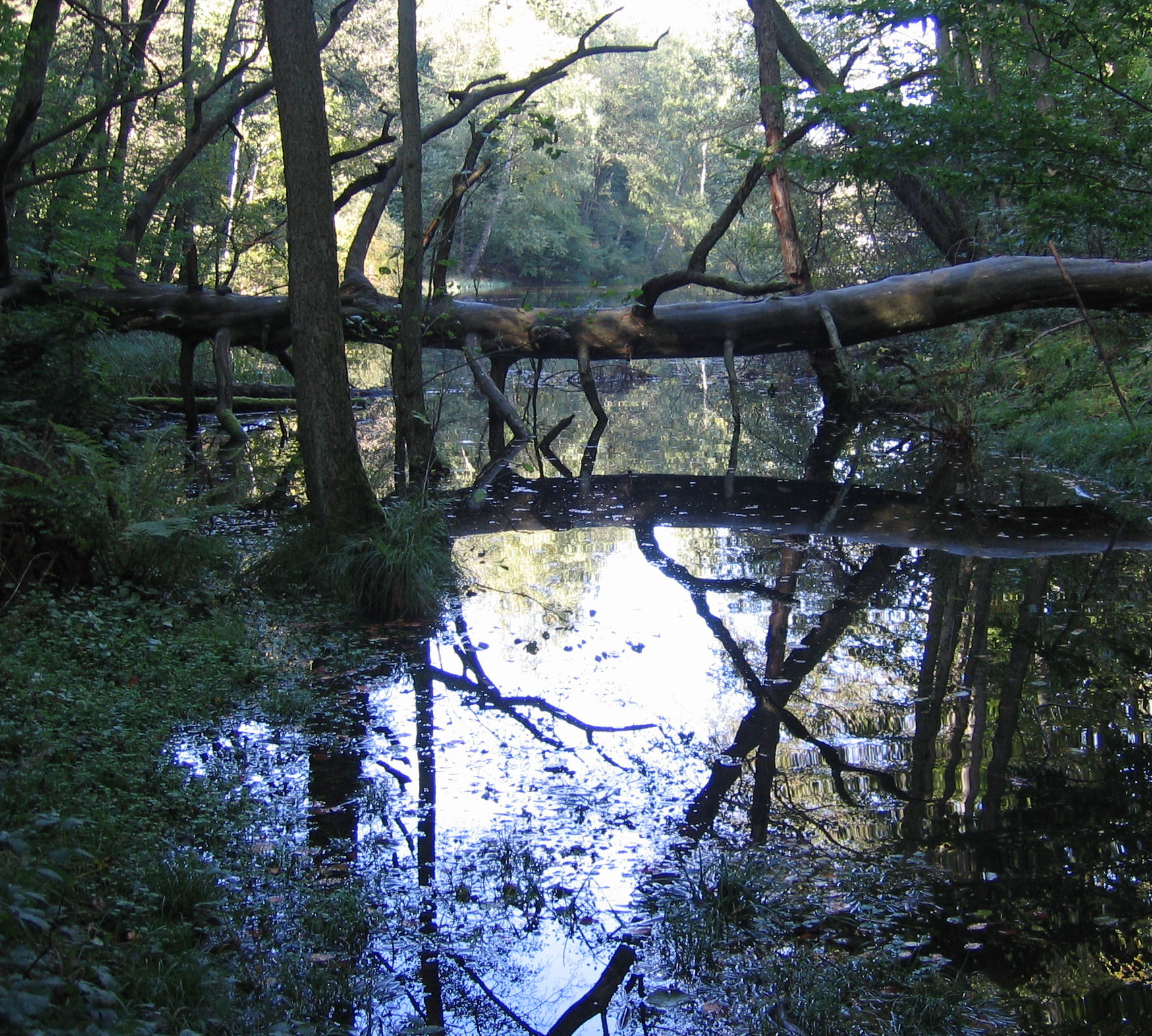
The shore of the Eiswoog

The area around the Eiswoog is a hiking area, which offers routes from easy to challenging in nature. A three kilometre path circumnavigates the lake. In a model project by the Kaiserslautern University of Technology part of the footpath and the facilities around the lake were modified to create a disabled-friendly nature trail. The aim of the project was to enable the observation platform, lakeside facilities and a panoramic footpath to be accessible to people with sight and mobility disabilities and to open it up to families with prams. The section phase of construction was completed in 2009 and the nature trail opened on 25 August by the Rhineland-Palatinate Minister for the Environment, Margit Conrad. The whole project cost €325,000, of which the state funded €295,000.

=== Eis Valley and Stumpfwald Railway ===
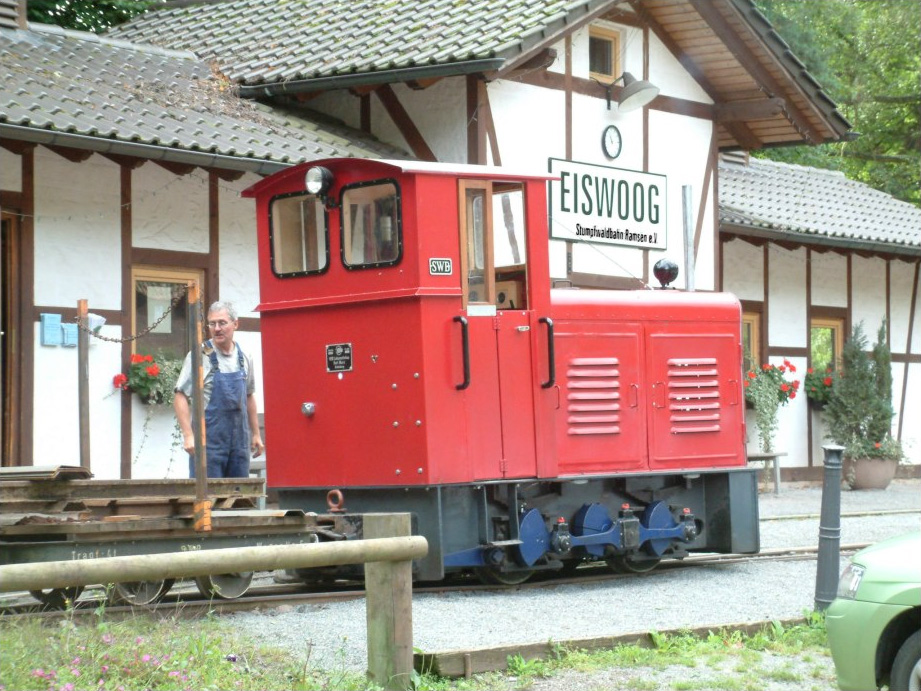
Stumpfwald Railway diesel locomotive and flat wagon

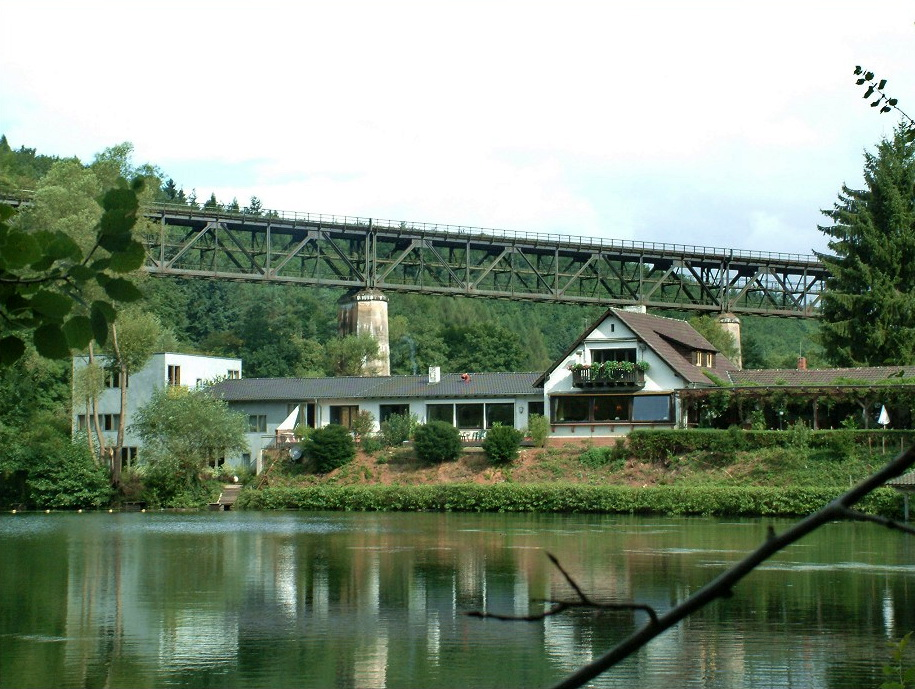
The viewing point is at the right hand end of the viaduct.

The current terminal halt (Haltepunkt Eiswoog) of the Eis Valley Railway, which was re-opened for tourism purposes, is only used at weekends. North of the dam, is the old railway bridge, the Eis Valley Viaduct, which used to carry the continuation of the railway towards the west, but this section is now closed. The bridge was completed in 1932 and was in service until 1988. It is 35 metres high and, at 250 metres long, is the longest railway bridge in the Palatinate. There is a good viewing point at its right-hand end.

Roughly parallel to the Eis Valley Railway there is a 600 mm narrow gauge line, the Stumpfwald Railway, that is worked at certain times between Ramsen and the Eiswoog as a heritage railway. It has open wagons and is now a tourist attraction.

== Literature ==
- Georg Spieß (2002), Nordpfälzer Geschichtsverein (ed.), "Der Eiswoog im Wandel der Zeiten", Nordpfälzer Geschichtsblätter (in German), Rockenhausen, pp. 49–53
- Marion Hoensbroech-Gienanth (2000), Donnersbergkreis (ed.), "Lebensqualität erfahrbar und bewußt machen: Gesamtkonzept Eiswoog – Ökologie vereint mit Kultur", Donnersberg-Jahrbuch (in German), Kirchheimbolanden, pp. 180–185
