= Hettenleidelheim =

- Municipality
- Coat of arms

- Location of Hettenleidelheim within Bad Dürkheim district
- Interactive map of Hettenleidelheim
- Location within Germany Location within Rhineland-Palatinate
- Coordinates: 49°32′08″N 08°04′24″E
- Country: Germany
- State: Rhineland-Palatinate
- District: Bad Dürkheim
- Municipal assoc.: Leiningerland

Government
  - Mayor (2019–24): Steffen Blaga (CDU)

Area
  - Total: 5.08 km^{2} (1.96 sq mi)
- Elevation: 295 m (968 ft)

Population (2025-12-31)
  - Total: 2,974
  - Density: 585/km^{2} (1,520/sq mi)
- Time zone: UTC+01:00 (CET)
  - Summer (DST): UTC+02:00 (CEST)
- Postal codes: 67310
- Dialling codes: 06351
- Vehicle registration: DÜW
- Website: www.hettenleidelheim.de

Hettenleidelheim (Palatine German: Hettrum) is an Ortsgemeinde – a municipality belonging to a Verbandsgemeinde, a kind of collective municipality – in the Bad Dürkheim district in Rhineland-Palatinate, Germany. Until 2018, it was the seat of the like-named Verbandsgemeinde.

== Geography ==
=== Location ===
The municipality lies in the north of the Palatinate Forest Nature Park (Naturpark Pfälzerwald) in the vicinity of the watershed between the Eisbach and the Eckbach, which flow by the municipality to the north and the south respectively. To the town of Eisenberg to the north, it is 2 km.

== History ==
In 1155, Hettenleidelheim had its first documentary mention and was originally made up of two centres: Hitenheim (later Hettenheim) and Luttelheim (later Leidelheim). Both fell under the Ramsen Monastery's lordship in the Middle Ages, passing to the Bishopric of Worms in 1485 after the monastery's dissolution. Municipal union under a common village court goes back to 1556. In the time of the Reformation, Hettenheim and Leidelheim, along with the outlying Protestant parishes of Eisenberg and Wattenheim, became Lutheran. However, already by about 1634, when the Catholic party got the upper hand in the Thirty Years' War, the two municipalities were first reassigned to the Catholic parish of Neuleiningen, and then in 1705 and 1707, the united municipality was raised to a Catholic parish in its own right. From the mid 19th century, and increasingly as of about 1870, the quarrying of the local highly fireproof clays grew into the municipality's main branch of industry, expanding to industrialized recovery in 1901. After the Second World War, though, this industry was disrupted. Until 1969, the municipality belonged to the now abolished district of Frankenthal. In 2005, Hettenleidelheim celebrated its 850-year jubilee.

=== Religion ===
Represented in the municipality are some 1,500 Catholic and 1,000 Protestant Christians, each group with its own parish, and a few Muslims. The Protestants moved to the community mainly in the latter half of the 20th century. The Catholic parish of St. Peter with its branch St. Georg, Tiefenthal, today form with Wattenheim and Altleiningen a parish community. The Protestant parish is an autonomous branch of Wattenheim.

The Jewish community that once existed in the municipality (synagogue in Wattenheim) is still witnessed by two old hidden graveyards that were used from the 18th to the 20th century, and where there are some gravestones worth seeing.

== Politics ==
=== Municipal council ===
The council is made up of 20 council members, who were elected at the municipal election held on 7 June 2009, and the honorary mayor as chairman.

The municipal election held on 7 June 2009 yielded the following results:

	SPD	CDU	FWG	Total
2009	9	8	3	20 seats
2004	9	9	2	20 seats

=== Mayor ===
Since 2016, the Mayor of Hettenleidelheim has been Steffen Blaga (CDU).

=== Deputies ===
1. Norbert Unterländer (CDU)
2. Dominik Wellstein (SPD)
3. Maria Altheimer (CDU)

=== Coat of arms ===
The German blazon reads: In Schwarz ein schrägrechtsgestellter silberner Schlüssel mit abwärtsgekehrtem Bart, unten rechts begleitet von einem schwebenden goldenen Andreaskreuz.

The municipality's arms might in English heraldic language be described thus: Sable a key bendwise argent, the wards in chief and turned to dexter, in base dexter a saltire Or.

The arms were approved by the now abolished Regierungsbezirk government in Neustadt in 1979 and go back to a seal from 1758. The key symbolizes the High Foundation of Worms whose patron was Saint Peter.

=== Town partnerships ===
Hettenleidelheim fosters partnerships with the following places:

- Blanzy, Saône-et-Loire, France since 1978

== Culture and sightseeing ==
=== Buildings ===
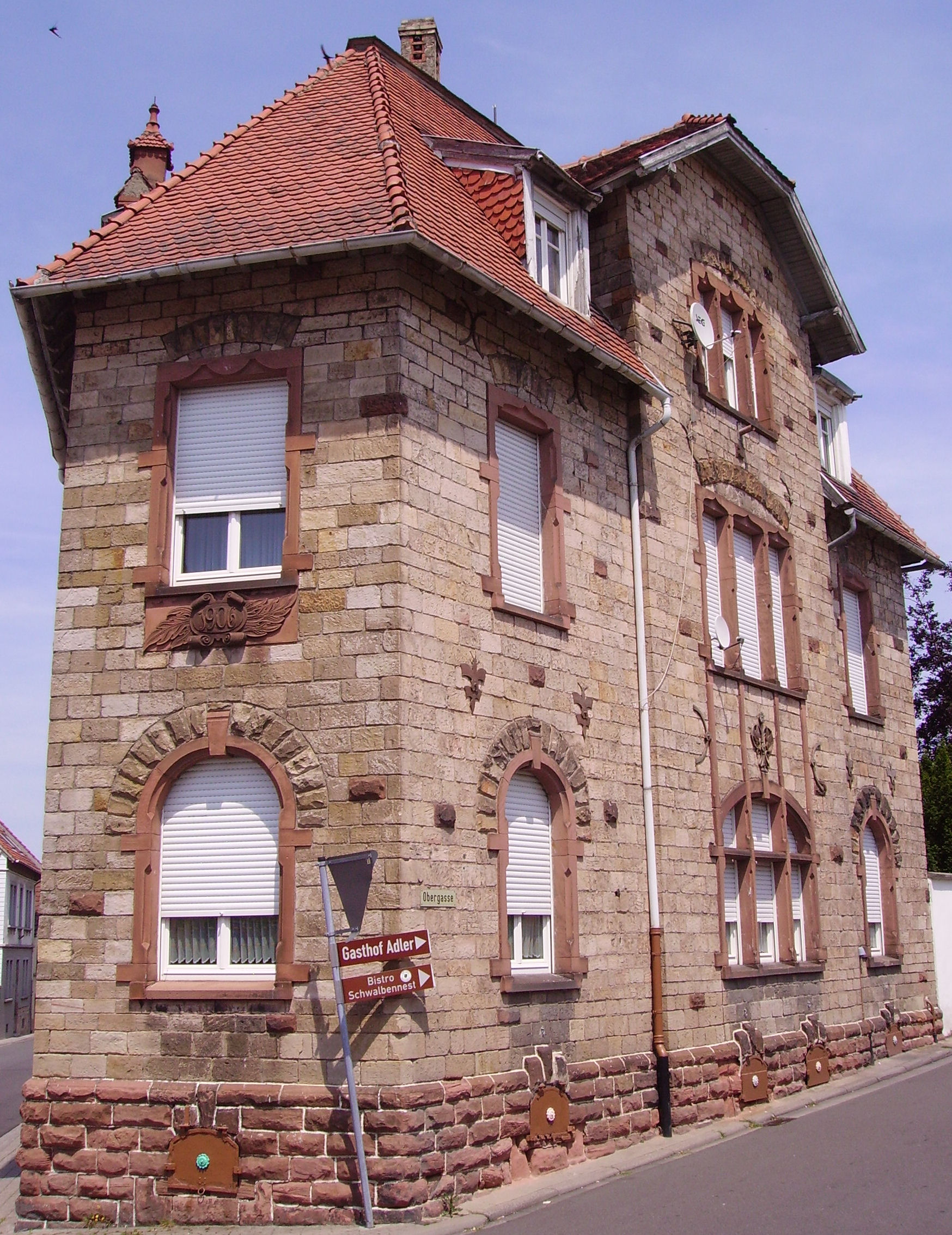
Gründerzeit house

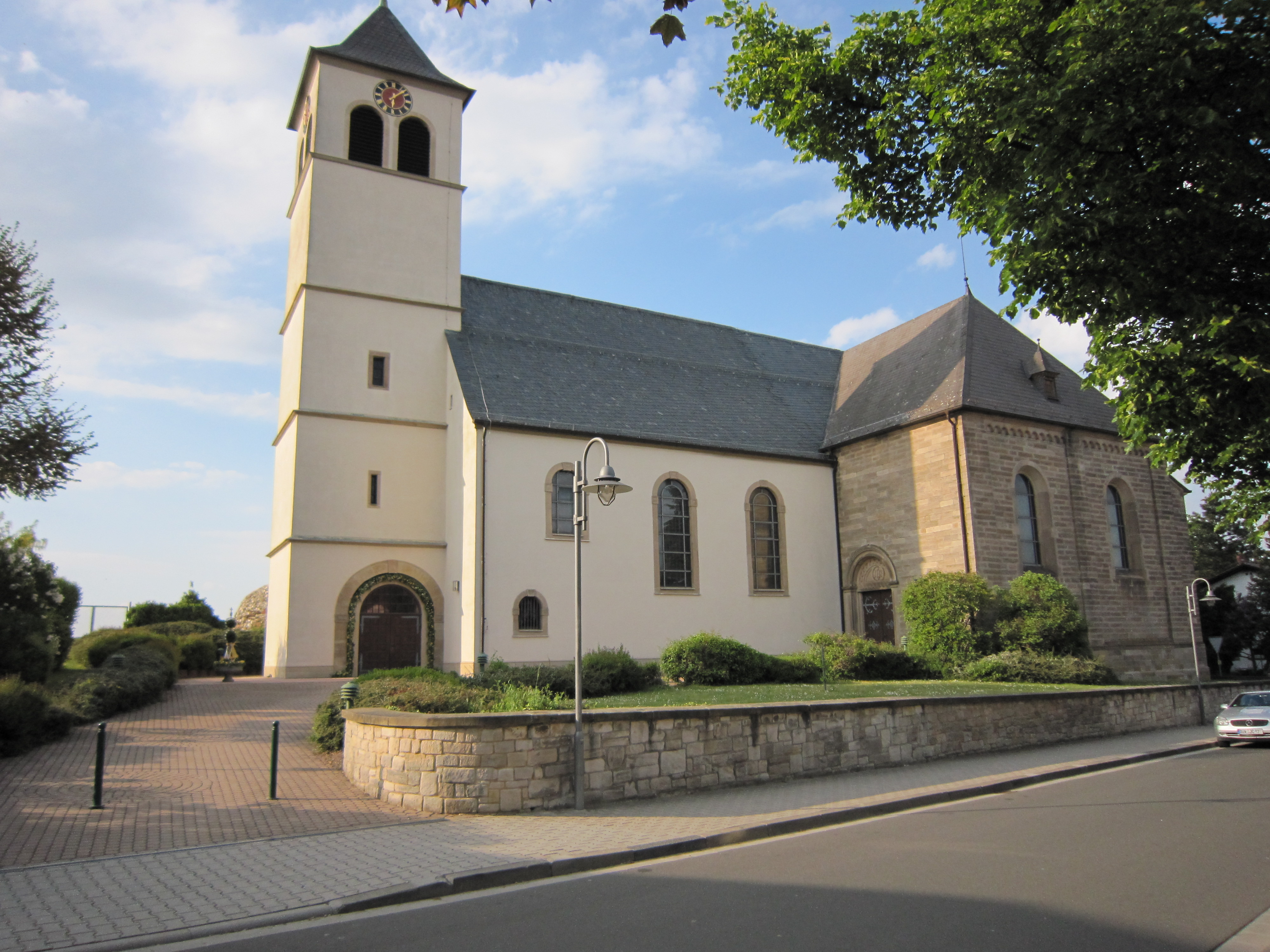
The Catholic Church of Hettenleidelheim

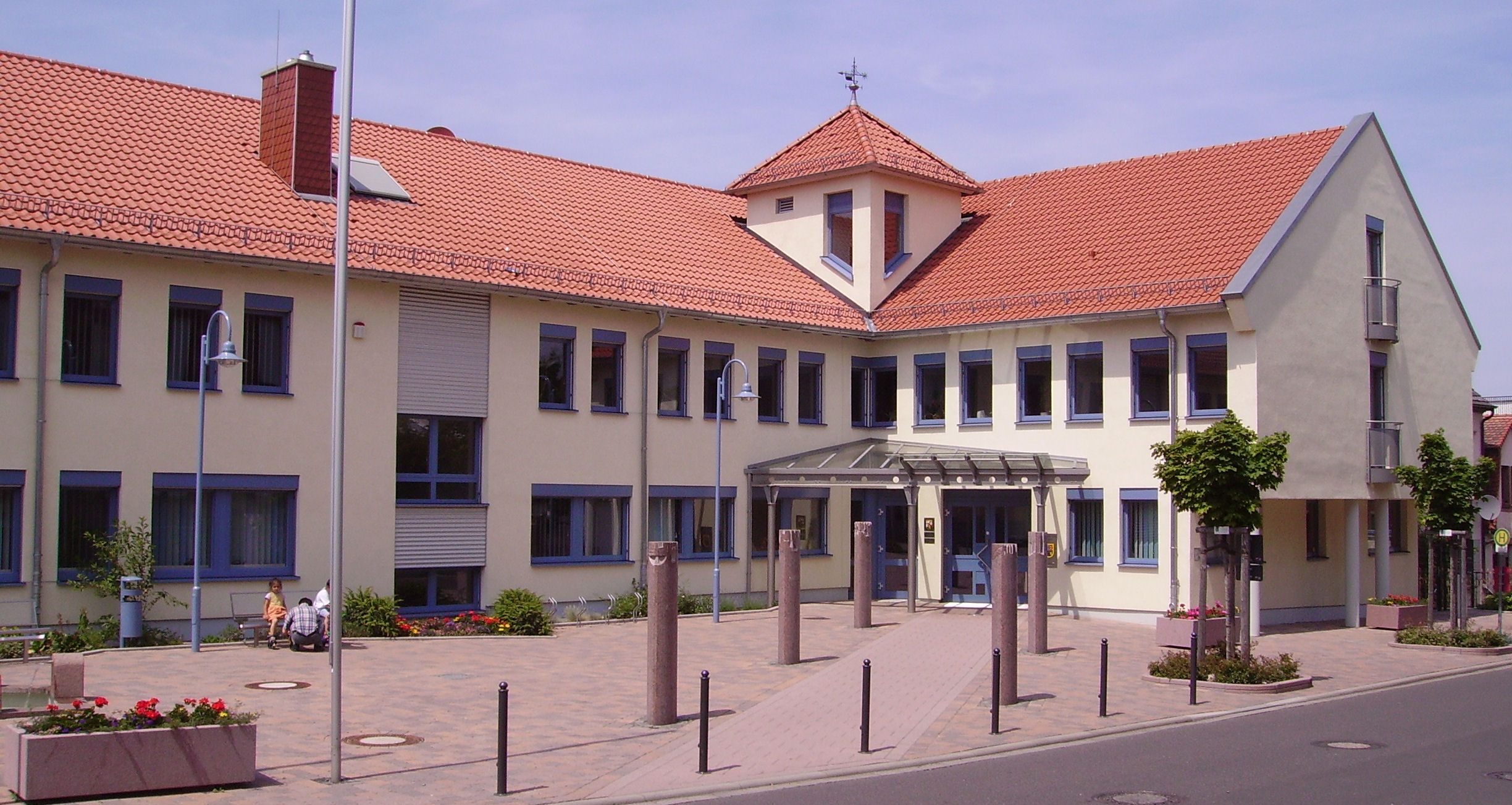
Verbandsgemeinde administration building

Catholic church – The Catholic Church stands in the constituent community of Leidelheim and was built from 1720 to 1724; from 1898 to 1901 it was expanded. It possesses two noteworthy stone Baroque altars from the time of its building.

Railway station – The old railway station is a work in dark sandstone from the late 19th century.

Kriegerhain – The Kriegerhain, or “Warriors’ Grove”, in Hettenheim's lower village harbours various monuments and noteworthy gravestones from the 17th century. The lands once served as the churchyard for Hettenheim's mediaeval Saint Stephen's Chapel (Stephanus-Kapelle), which between 1720 and 1724 was forsaken in favour of the then newly built parish church in Leidelheim.

Jewish graveyards – Next to the Warriors’ Grove lies the older of the municipality's two Jewish graveyards (18th century); the newer one was laid out in the 19th century on the boulevard that leads to Tiefenthal.

Alte Schule – Unusual is the Alte Schule, or “Old School”, built in the late 19th century with a crenellated tower; it now serves as the “house of clubs”.

Municipal festival hall – The spacious Gemeindefesthalle came into being in the 1920s and was renovated about 2000. It was built by the gymnastic club Gut Heil using prestressed concrete.

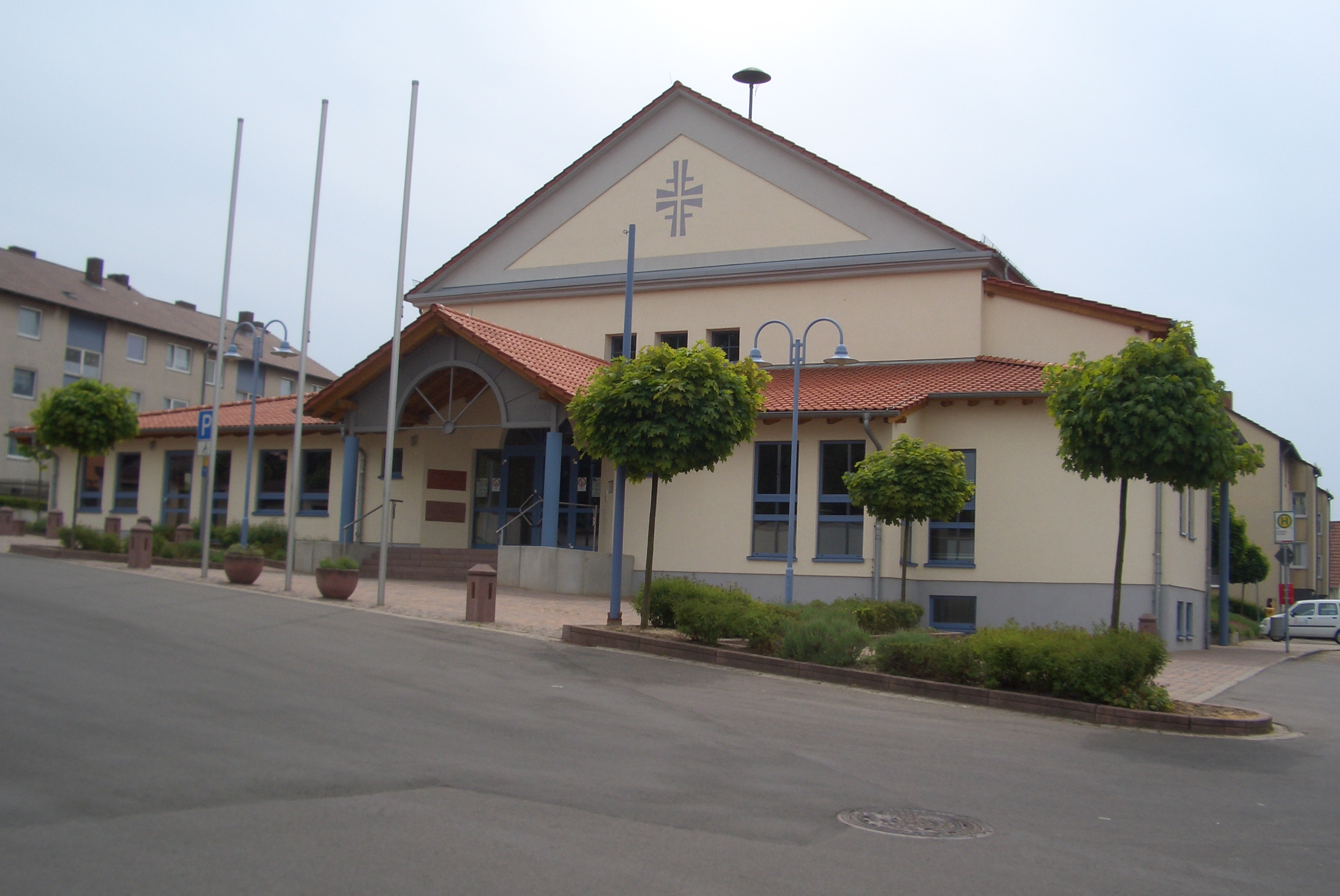
Festhalle Hettenleidelheim, originally built by the gymnastics club Gut-Heil as gym.

Local history museum – The Heimatmuseum with its Karl Blum Archive tells the municipality's history and also the history of quarrying clay.

=== Natural monuments ===
Towards Eisenberg lies the Erdekaut protected area.

=== Music ===
Concerning themselves with performing music are Saint Peter's Catholic Church Choir (Katholischer Kirchenchor St. Peter), the Sängerbund Frohsinn (“singers’ league”) and the Miner's Wind Orchestra (Bergmannsblasorchester).

=== Regular events ===
- Waldfest, or Forest Festival (in the Birkenschlag): Whit Monday
- Kermis (church consecration festival, locally known as the Kerwe): last weekend in August
- Barbara markt: early December

== Economy and infrastructure ==
=== Economy ===
Hettenleidelheim once earned its livelihood from quarrying clay. This economic activity has since been given up.

=== Transport ===
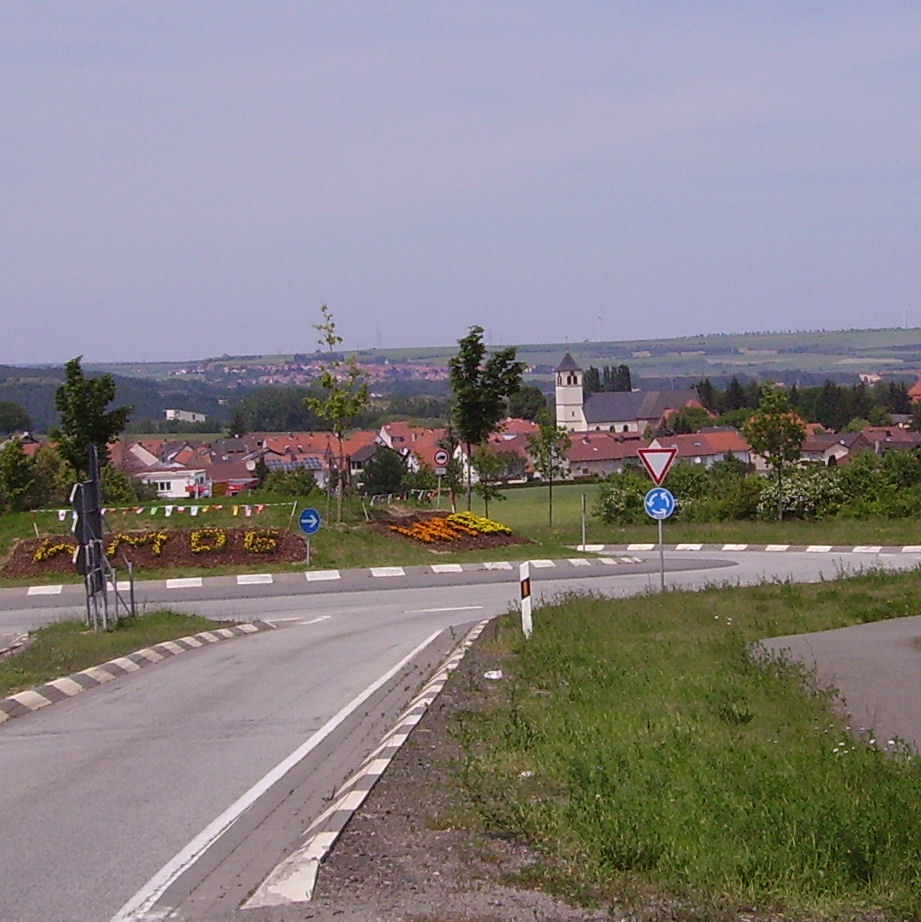
Roundabout in Hettenleidelheim

The municipality lies near the Autobahn Autobahn 6 and can be reached through the Wattenheim interchange (1 km). From 1895 to 1990, there was a railway link to Ebertsheim connecting with the Eistalbahn (another railway between Grünstadt and Enkenbach); passenger service was ended as early as 1954, and until the line was permanently closed, it was used only for goods transport. The railway to Grünstadt can nowadays be reached by bus, which goes to Eisenberg station.

=== Public institutions ===
As seat of the Verbandsgemeinde, Hettenleidelheim is home to this body's administration.

=== Education ===
Hettenleidelheim has its own primary school; secondary schools are available in neighbouring places.

== Famous people ==
=== Honorary citizens ===
- Karl Blum, local historian

=== Sons and daughters of the town ===
- Jakob Schwalb (1872–1934), Catholic priest, deacon in Göllheim, Nazi victim.
- Nikolaus Osterroth (1875–1933), politician (SPD), member of the Weimar National Assembly
- Georg Schmidt (1902–1962), politician (Zentrum), Member of the North Rhine-Westphalian Landtag.

=== Famous people associated with the municipality ===
- Werner Holz, painter and graphic artist
- Theo Rörig, sculptor
- Dr. Heinrich Schwalb, physician and patron
- Hans and Wiltrud Werner, landscape painters
