= Eis Valley Railway =

German railway line

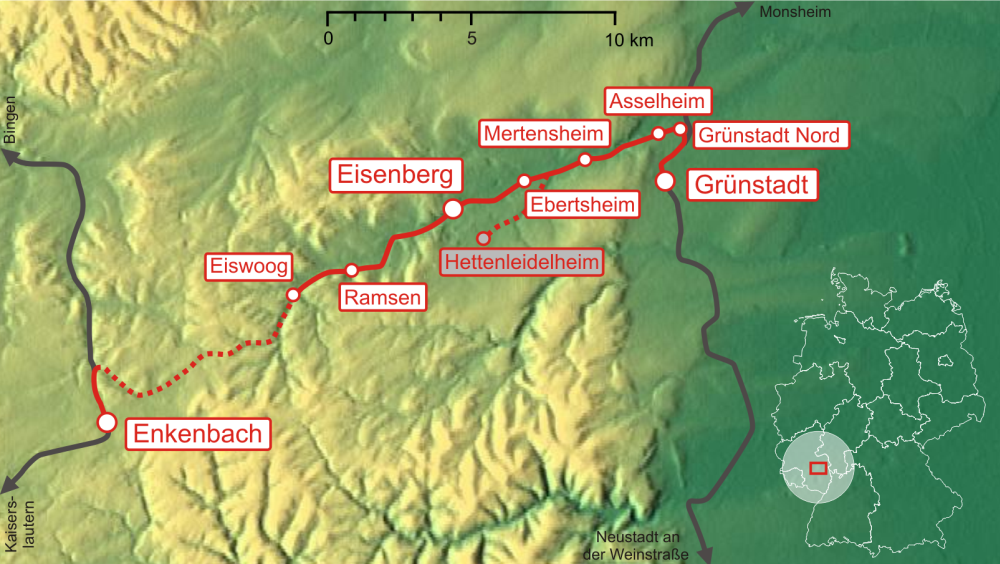

Overview
- Native name: Eistalbahn
- Line number: 3420 (Grünstadt–Enkenbach)
- Locale: Rhineland-Palatinate, Germany
- Termini: Grünstadt; Enkenbach

Service
- Route number: 666 (Grünstadt–Eiswoog), ex 272a & 274h

Technical
- Line length: 26.3 km (16.3 mi)
- Track gauge: 1,435 mm (4 ft 8 1/2 in) standard gauge

The Eis Valley Railway (German: Eistalbahn) is a branch line in the German state of Rhineland-Palatinate, that runs through the Palatine Forest. It runs from Grünstadt in a southwesterly direction through the valley of the Eisbach (or "Eis") to Enkenbach. The section from Grünstadt to Eisenberg was opened as early as 1876 by the Palatine Northern Railway Company. The iron ore industry in and around Eisenberg gave the line considerable importance for the transport of goods, whilst passenger services played a rather secondary role. The remaining stretch of line to Enkenbach was not completed until 1932 under the direction of the Deutsche Reichsbahn. After passenger services had been withdrawn in 1976, strategic considerations during the Cold War prevented its complete closure. Goods traffic between Eisenberg and Enkenbach ended in 1988. In the period from 1994 to 2001 the line between Grünstadt and the Eiswoog reservoir was re-opened; the remaining section, however, stayed closed. Goods traffic ceased entirely in 2001.

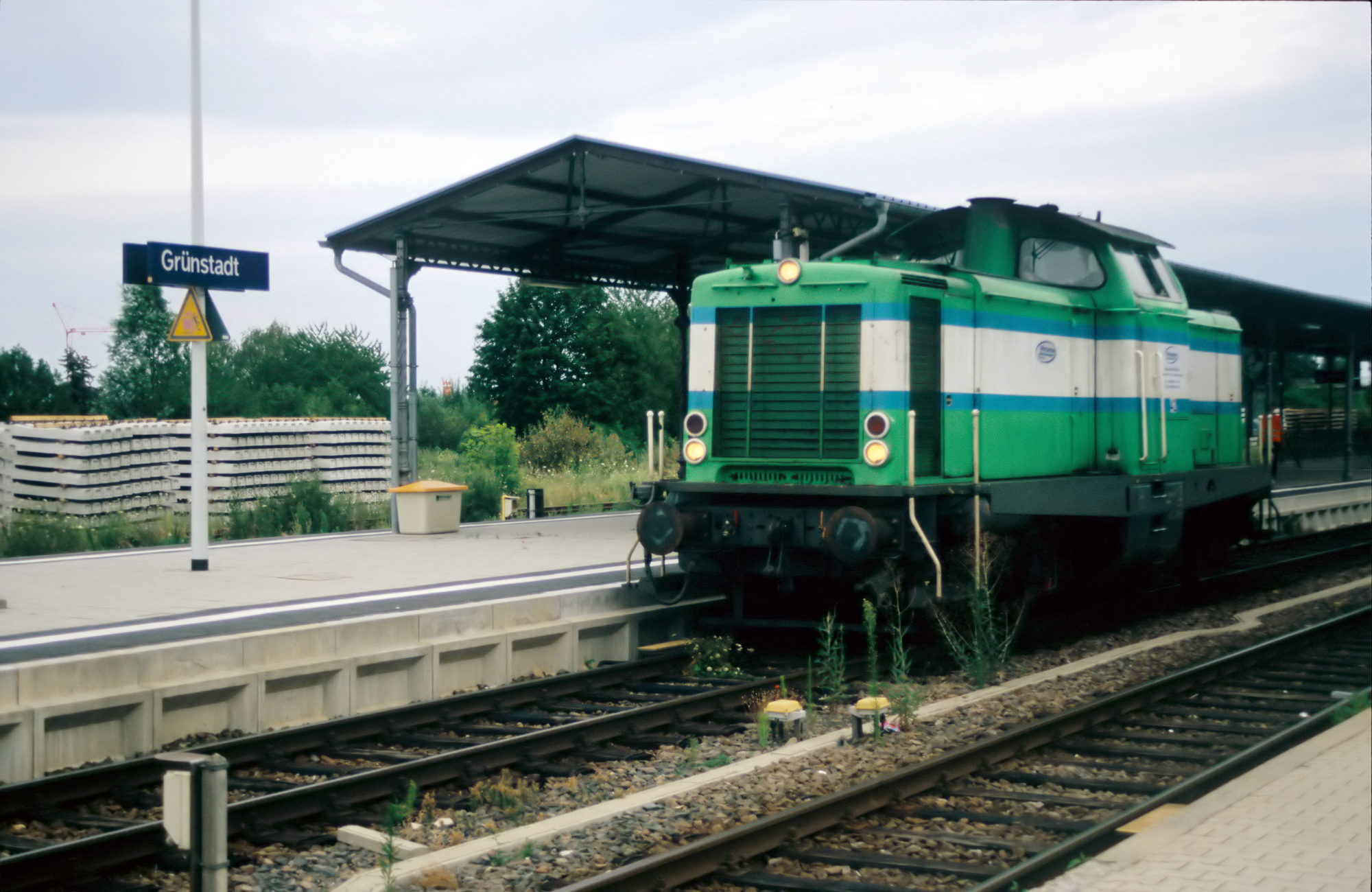
Grünstadt station, start of the Eis Valley Railway

== Literature ==
- Wolfgang Fiegenbaum; Wolfgang Klee (2002), Rückkehr zur Schiene – Reaktivierte und neue Strecken im Personenverkehr 1980–2001 (in German), Berlin: transpress, ISBN 3-613-71185-0
- Klaus D. Holzborn (1993), Eisenbahn-Reviere Pfalz (in German), Berlin: transpress, ISBN 3-344-70790-6
- Heinz Sturm (2005), Die pfälzischen Eisenbahnen (in German), Ludwigshafen am Rhein: pro MESSAGE, ISBN 3-934-84526-6
