= Ramsen, Rhineland-Palatinate =

Ramsen
- Municipality
- Coat of arms

- Location of Ramsen within Donnersbergkreis district
- Interactive map of Ramsen
- Location within Germany Location within Rhineland-Palatinate
- Coordinates: 49°32′12″N 8°00′47″E
- Country: Germany
- State: Rhineland-Palatinate
- District: Donnersbergkreis
- Municipal assoc.: Eisenberg (Pfalz)

Government
  - Mayor (2019–24): Arnold Ruster

Area
  - Total: 27.06 km^{2} (10.45 sq mi)
- Elevation: 288 m (945 ft)

Population (2025-12-31)
  - Total: 1,820
  - Density: 67.3/km^{2} (174/sq mi)
- Time zone: UTC+01:00 (CET)
  - Summer (DST): UTC+02:00 (CEST)
- Postal codes: 67305
- Dialling codes: 06351
- Vehicle registration: KIB

Ramsen (German pronunciation: [ˈʁamzn̩]; Palatine German: Ramse) is a municipality in the Donnersbergkreis district, in Rhineland-Palatinate, Germany.
