= Deidesheim =

- Town
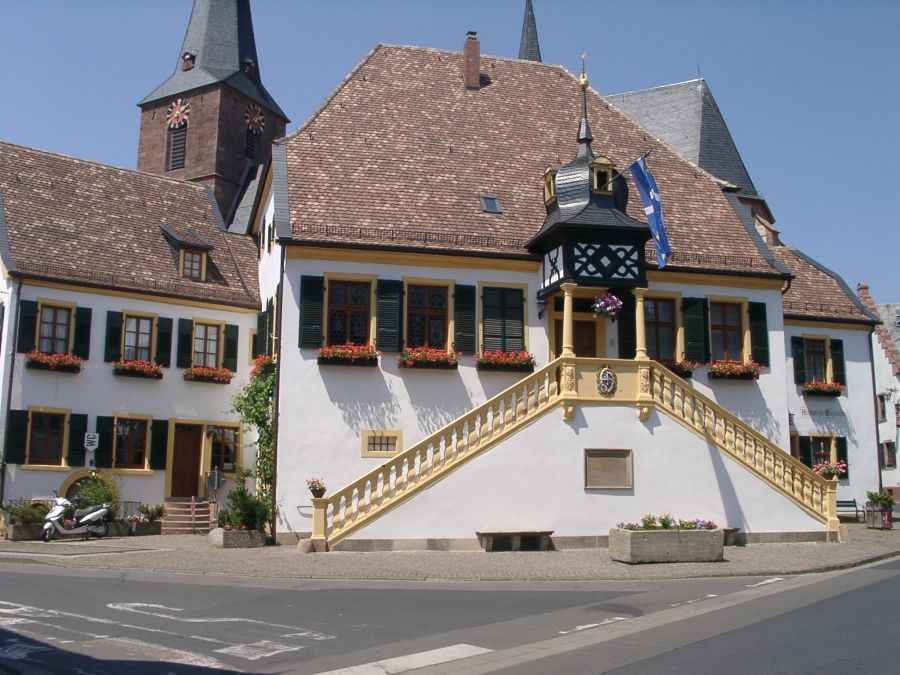
- Landmark: The Historic Town Hall

- Coat of arms

- Location of Deidesheim within Bad Dürkheim district
- Interactive map of Deidesheim
- Location within Germany Location within Rhineland-Palatinate
- Coordinates: 49°24′27″N 8°11′11″E
- Country: Germany
- State: Rhineland-Palatinate
- District: Bad Dürkheim
- Municipal assoc.: Deidesheim

Government
  - Mayor (2019–24): Manfred Dörr (CDU)

Area
  - Total: 26.54 km^{2} (10.25 sq mi)
- Elevation: 120 m (390 ft)

Population (2025-12-31)
  - Total: 3,622
  - Density: 136.5/km^{2} (353.5/sq mi)
- Time zone: UTC+01:00 (CET)
  - Summer (DST): UTC+02:00 (CEST)
- Postal codes: 67146
- Dialling codes: 06326
- Vehicle registration: DÜW
- Website: www.deidesheim.de

Deidesheim (German pronunciation: [ˈdaɪdəsˌhaɪm]; Palatine German: Daisem) is a town in the Bad Dürkheim district in Rhineland-Palatinate, Germany with some 3,700 inhabitants.

The town lies in the northwest of the Rhine-Neckar urban agglomeration and since 1973 it has been the seat of the Verbandsgemeinde of Deidesheim. The most important industries are tourism and winegrowing. Deidesheim's two biggest folk festivals revolve around wine: the Geißbockversteigerung (literally “Billygoat Auction”) and the Deidesheimer Weinkerwe (wine fair).

== Geography ==
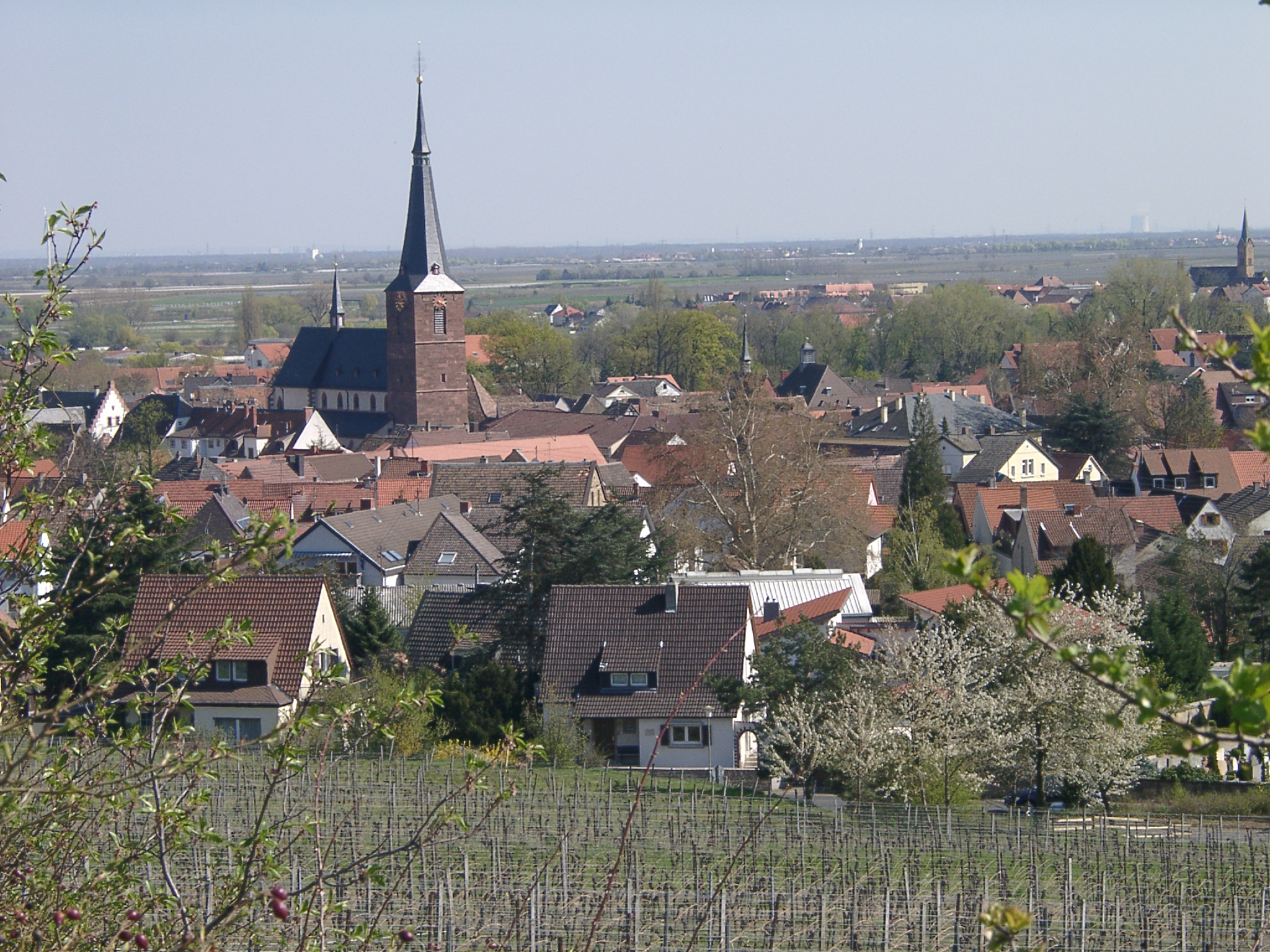
Deidesheim, seen from the northwest

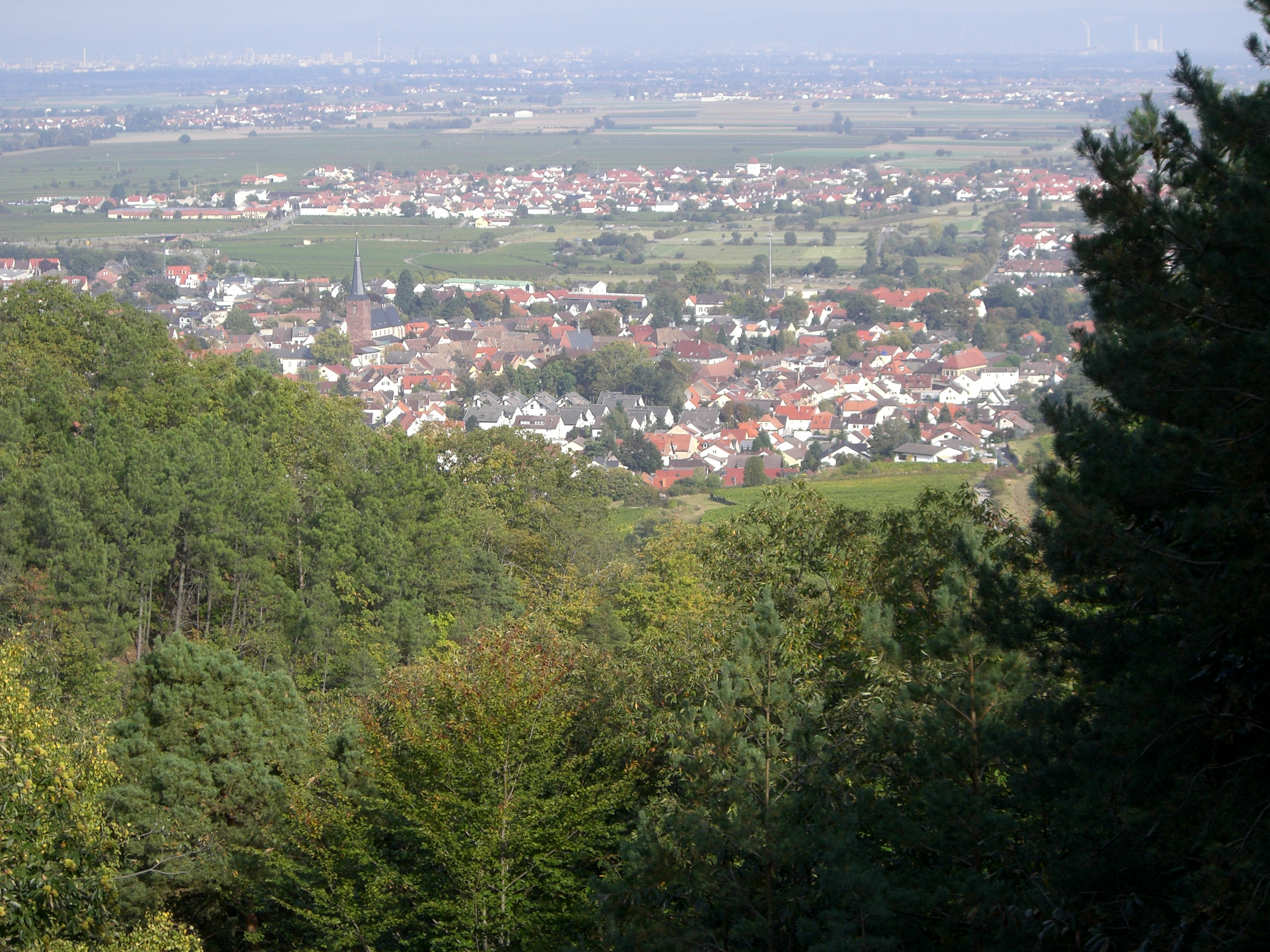
The Palatinate Forest lies to Deidesheim's west

=== Location ===
Deidesheim lies in the Palatinate in the Weinstraße region (as distinct from the Deutsche Weinstraße – or German Wine Route – itself). Deidesheim's municipal area stretches for 26.53 square kilometres (10.24 sq mi), covering parts of three morphological and ecological units, namely the Palatinate Forest, the Weinstraße region's uplands and the Upper Rhine Plain: 23.9% of this area is used for agriculture, mainly grape-growing for wine, 67.9% of it is wooded, 0.6% is water, 7.4% is residential or transport-related and 0.1% of the land fits under none of these headings. The town itself lies some 1 000 m east of the Haardt. Deidesheim is found in the northwest of the Rhine-Neckar urban region in the middle of the Palatinate wine region. Running through the town is the German Wine Route.

=== Neighbouring municipalities ===
Clockwise from the north, these are Forst an der Weinstraße, Friedelsheim, Rödersheim-Gronau, Niederkirchen bei Deidesheim, Meckenheim, Ruppertsberg, Neustadt an der Weinstraße, Lindenberg, Lambrecht, Frankeneck, Neidenfels and Wachenheim an der Weinstraße.

=== Climate ===
Macroclimatically, Deidesheim is characterized by the surrounding relief: The Palatinate Forest to the west forces the main, rain-bearing winds from the west and southwest upwards, whereupon they cool and their water condenses, raining down on the Palatinate Forest. The now drier air then falls at the forest's east side warming back up, making for a drier, less cloudy climate with warmer temperatures to the forest's lee. The number of summery days (that is, with temperatures reaching or surpassing 25 °C) far exceeds the countrywide average by 40 or 50 each year, and the yearly precipitation level of just over 500 mm (20 in) is below the threshold, set at 600 mm (24 in), for German regions that are considered dry.

From a local climatic point of view, Deidesheim is part of the climatically favoured foothill zone of the Weinstraße region. With a mean elevation of 235 m above sea level at the forest's edge, the lands of the Deidesheim area reach down to some 130 m above sea level at the lower mid-slope area in the foothill zone. The outliers of the Madental and the Sensental, as well as those of the Einsteltal (dales) northwest of Deidesheim, form outflow pathways for the cold winds coming from the Haardt. Also affecting the local climate are small hollows and dells in which cold air can gather.

Climatic conditions in Deidesheim have almost Mediterranean traits as witnessed by ripening figs, almonds and bitter oranges in the area. Profiting especially from the favourable climate are warmth-loving crops such as grapes. This favours the growing of Qualitätsweine, which is done here on a grand scale. With its long growing season, the wine can age fully. Thoroughly fermented wines have a high quality, and frost damage is rare.

=== Geology ===
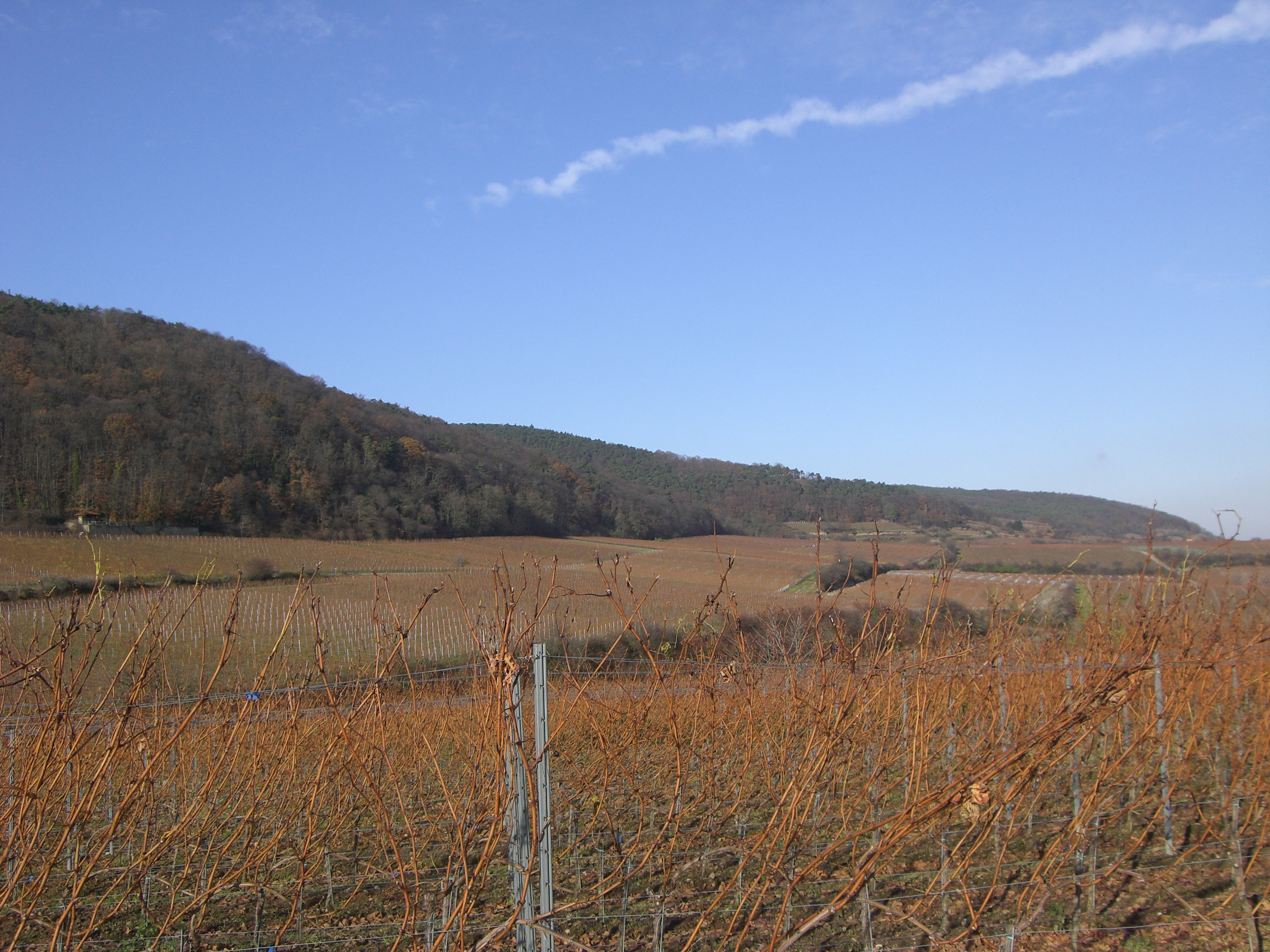
Meeting point of the Haardt and the Upper Rhine Plain

The most important event in the Deidesheim area's, and indeed the whole eastern Palatinate's, geological development was the rifting and downfaulting relative to the Haardt of the Upper Rhine Plain, whose onset was some 65,000,000 years ago in the Lower Tertiary and which has lasted until today. The area before the Haardt range was over time scored by brooks that rise in the Palatinate Forest. During the ice ages, there were gradual solifluction on the slopes and also wind abrasion. These processes led to a transformation of the original surface relief in whose wake an alluvial fan with embanked or eroded terraces formed. In colder, drier phases of the Würm glaciation, loess beds came into being through the influence of the wind, whereby the loess gathered mostly at faults and alee of small hollows.

West and northwest of Deidesheim, the Voltziensandstein that predominates in the middle of the Palatinate Forest from the Triassic represents the oldest stratigraphic unit within Deidesheim's limits, the so-called “Rehberg Layer”. In Deidesheim's southwest, Pleistocene deposits can be found; these came into being some 1,500,000 years ago. In the north, Deidesheim is girded by a band of Pliocene deposits that formed some 3,000,000 years ago. In Deidesheim's east are found the newest stratigraphic units in the Holocene deposits. With foreign material such as basalt, bricks and dung, man has altered the natural soil composition. The most important soil types in the Deidesheim area are various rigosols, rendzina, parabraunerde and limestone-bearing terra fusca.

== History ==
=== Founding and Early Middle Ages ===
The name Deidesheim had its first documentary mention in 699, although the town now standing in its current location only arose, it is believed, in the 13th century around the former Deidesheim Castle. From 770 onwards, there is proof of winegrowing here. In the early 19th century, Deidesheim was the first place in the Palatinate whose wineries were growing Qualitätsweine. Today, Deidesheim is one of the Palatinate wine region's biggest winegrowing centres.

The first time when the placename was mentioned in 699 was in a document in which the Lotharingian nobleman Erimbert bequeathed estates under his ownership to Weißenburg Monastery in Alsace (in the now French town called Wissembourg). Further mentions came in documents from Fulda Abbey (770 or 771) and Lorsch Abbey (791), in the latter of which Deidesheim is already named as being a winegrowing centre. Documentary mentions from the Early and High Middle Ages, however, deal with various settled places that lay not in the town's current place, but rather elsewhere within a greater municipal area around Deidesheim. Frankish burial grounds in and around the neighbouring municipality Niederkirchen bei Deidesheim lead to the conclusion that there were individual settlements at least as long ago as the 6th century, some of which were forsaken. The first documentary mention is believed to refer to neighbouring Niederkirchen. When today's Deidesheim arose as a settlement next to Niederkirchen is not known with any certainty; the two centres only became separate from each other when the Prince-Bishop's castle, Schloss Deidesheim, was built, and for this the first evidence dates from 1292. The first confirmed distinction between Niederdeidesheim – today's Niederkirchen – and Oberdeidesheim – today's Deidesheim – only came in the 13th century.

In the Early Middle Ages, Deidesheim was mainly under the aforesaid Erimbert's and his descendants’ ownership. Among them were a few Counts of Metz, Upper Lotharingian dukes and Salians, and they had holdings in Deidesheim for almost 400 years, until Henry IV (1056) and Margravine Matilda of Tuscany (1086) gave up their Deidesheim holdings and donated them to the Cathedral Chapter or Saint Guy's Monastery in Speyer. Not long thereafter, Deidesheim passed into the Speyer Prince-Bishops’ hands and thenceforth belonged to the Prince-Bishopric of Speyer. Other, but less important, holdings in Deidesheim in the Early Middle Ages were owned by Lorsch Abbey and the Bishopric of Worms.

=== Further development ===
As the Speyer Bishopric's records confirm, Deidesheim quickly grew into an economically important centre to which contributed financially strong Jews, who had their own community with a synagogue in Deidesheim until the pogroms during the time of the plague about 1349.

Along with this development arose the townsmen's wish to offer the flourishing community greater protection against attacks, which was granted at last by Bishop of Speyer Gerhard von Ehrenberg in 1360 when he granted Deidesheim fortification rights. On Saint Valentine's Day 1395, the Bohemian King Wenceslaus (Wenzel in German, Václav in Czech) granted Deidesheim town rights. These were given – as was then customary – not to the town itself, but to the Bishop of Speyer, since he was the town's lord.

The fortification could only afford the town limited protection in wartime. The town was conquered in 1396, 1460, 1525, 1552, several times in the Thirty Years' War, and in 1689 and 1693 (Nine Years' War), sometimes getting plundered and set on fire in the process.

=== Early modern times ===
With the invasion by French militiamen, Deidesheim passed to France in 1794. Although it was reconquered by Imperial troops in 1795, it soon fell again to France, and remained under French administration until Napoleon's overlordship collapsed in 1814. Under the new territorial order prescribed by the Congress of Vienna, Deidesheim belonged, beginning in 1816, to the Kingdom of Bavaria as part of the Rheinkreis (“Rhine District”), which from 1838 bore the name Pfalz (“Palatinate”). In 1819, the outlying centre of Niederkirchen, long considered to be a constituent community of Deidesheim, was demerged from the town, and has been an autonomous municipality ever since.

In 1865, Deidesheim acquired a connection on the new Bad Dürkheim - Neustadt an der Weinstraße railway line. Around the start of the 20th century, there were other industrial achievements. In 1894, Deidesheim got a gasworks, in 1896 electric lighting, in 1897 a local electrical network, and in 1898, the town was connected to a public watermain. Furthermore, in the late 19th century, all important estates had a telephone connection.

=== 20th century onwards ===
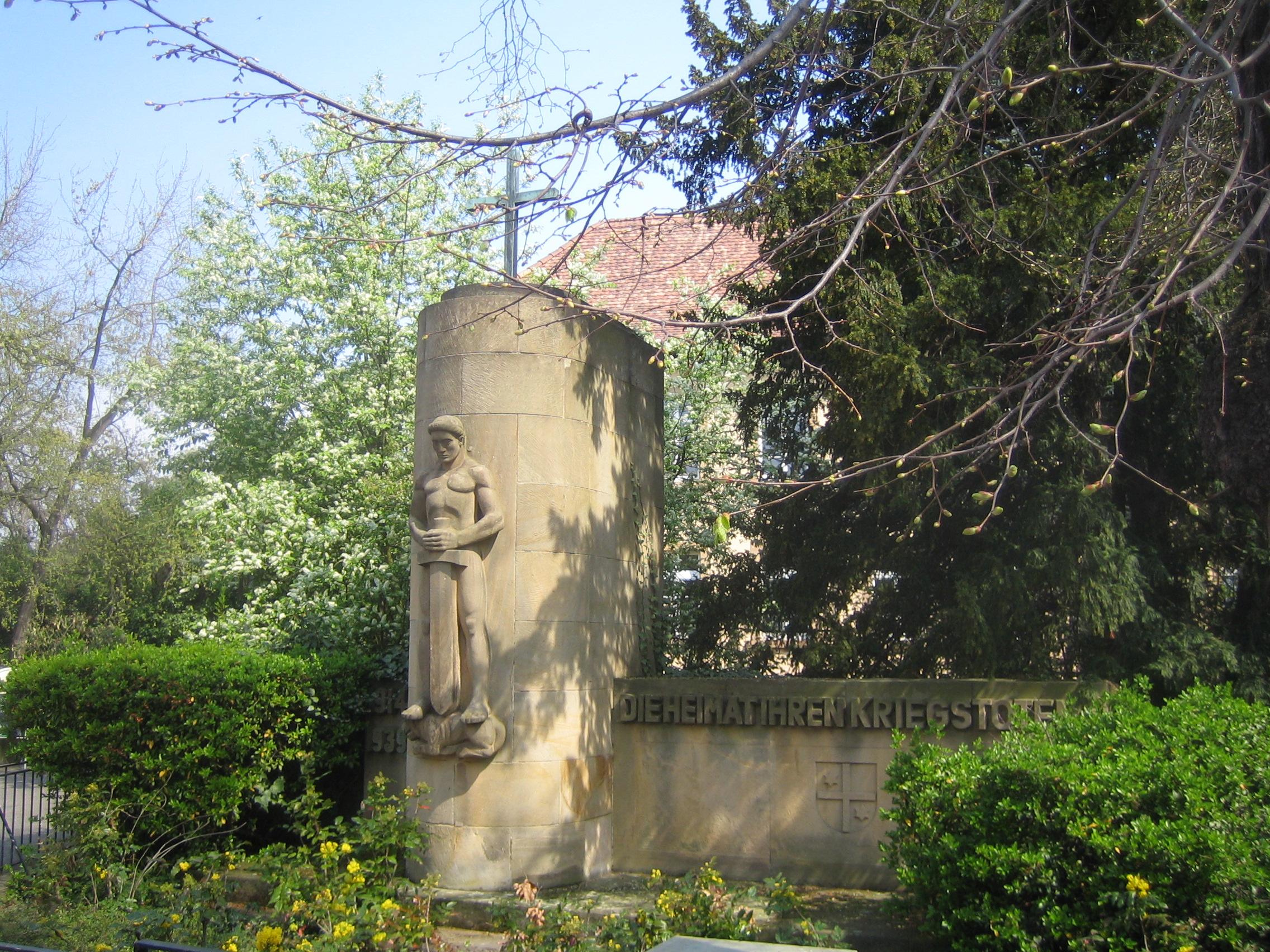
Memorial to those who fell in the two World Wars, on Bahnhofsstraße

After the First World War in 1918, French troops moved into town. Troop units were billeted here. This persisted until France withdrew from the Rhineland in July 1930. In August 1921 there was a great forest fire near Deidesheim in which some 300 ha of woodland burnt, of which 130 ha was in the Deidesheim town forest. To fight the fire, all Deidesheim's men aged 17 and over were recruited. Quenching the fire took three long days and nights.

During the Second World War, Deidesheim was mostly spared any great war damage at first, but then, on 9 March 1945, not long before the war ended, the local infirmary was struck by a bomb, which killed nine people. On 21 March 1945, American troops moved into town, ending the war, at least in Deidesheim.

With the formation of the state of Rhineland-Palatinate in 1946, Deidesheim found itself within it, and no longer part of Bavaria. In 1968, Deidesheim was given the designation Luftkurort (“climatic spa”). Along with Forst an der Weinstraße, Ruppertsberg, Niederkirchen and Meckenheim, Deidesheim has since 1972 formed the Verbandsgemeinde of Deidesheim.

Great media coverage came Deidesheim's way with all the visits by high-ranking foreign state visitors invited to Deidesheim by then Chancellor Helmut Kohl between 1989 and 1997. Often, state guests were served the dish Pfälzer Saumagen (“Palatine Sow’s Stomach”). The state guests who came with Kohl were British Prime Minister Margaret Thatcher (April 1989), Soviet President Mikhail Gorbachev (November 1990), Canadian Prime Minister Brian Mulroney (June 1991), US Vice President Dan Quayle (February 1992), Czech President Václav Havel (October 1993), Russian President Boris Yeltsin (May 1994), British Prime Minister John Major (October 1994) and the Spanish King and Queen Juan Carlos I and Sofía (July 1997).

Since early 2009, Deidesheim has been the first town in Rhineland-Palatinate to be a member of the Cittàslow movement, among whose goals are improving the quality of life and enhancing cultural diversity in towns.

=== Population development ===
Year	1530	1618	1667	1702	1737	1774	1815	1849	1871	1895	1917	1933	1953	2006
Inhabitants	some 500	some 630	561	444	895	1,241	1,760	2,729	2,697	2,783	2,197	2,559	3,100	3,739

From the Middle Ages has come no information about Deidesheim's population. In part, considerable swings in the 17th and early 18th centuries in the number of inhabitants were the consequences of the many wars; foremost among these were the Thirty Years' War and the Nine Years' War (known in Germany as the Pfälzischer Erbfolgekrieg, or War of the Palatine Succession) in their effect on Deidesheim's population. In the rather more peaceful later 18th century, Deidesheim underwent a great upswing in its population, bringing the total number of inhabitants to nearly three times what it had been towards the end of the Middle Ages. After the next quick swelling of the population leading up to the Palatine Uprising in 1849, Deidesheim's population did not rise significantly in the latter half of the 19th century – which was rather at odds with the general trend in Germany in this time of industrialization – and even shrank around the start of the 20th century, leaving Deidesheim with fewer inhabitants in 1917 than it had had in 1823. The main cause of all this was people from Deidesheim emigrating to North America. Only years after the First World War did Deidesheim's population again reach its mid-19th-century level. After the Second World War, the number of inhabitants again began to rise sharply and for the first time broke the 3,000 level. Over the last few years, the population has been relatively steady and amounts to some 3,800 inhabitants.

== Religion ==
=== St. Ulrich’s Catholic parish ===
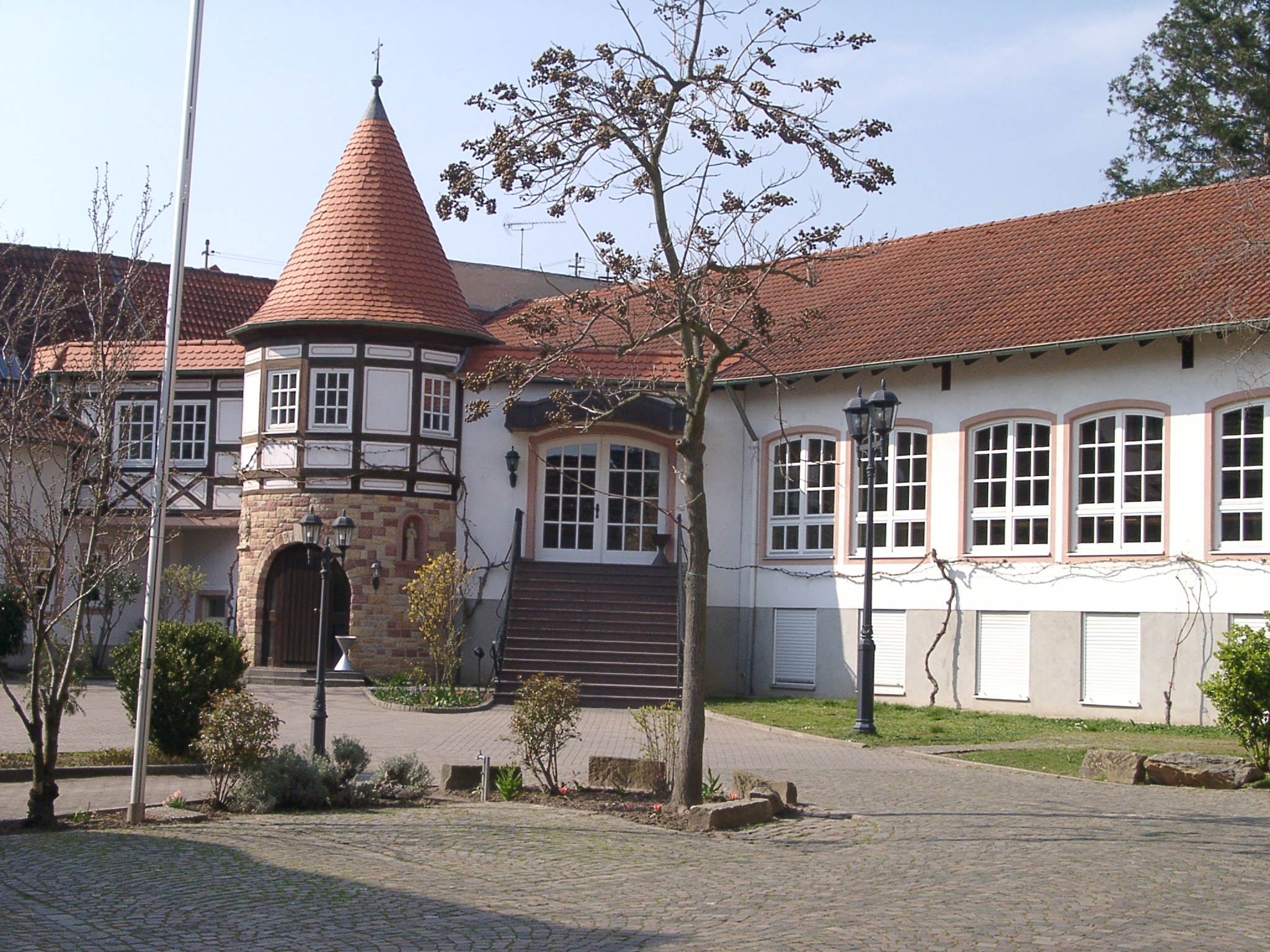
Catholic parish hall

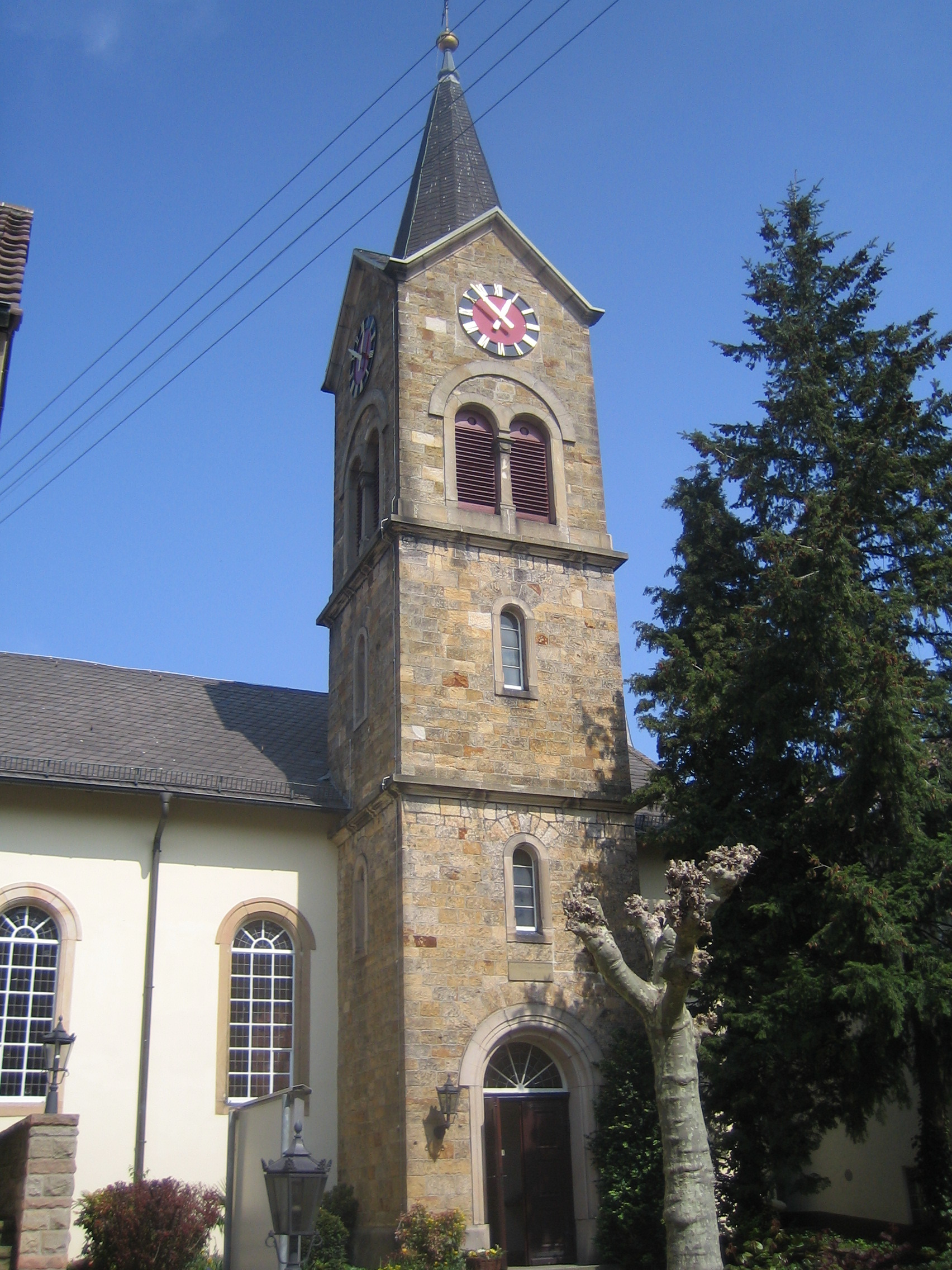
Protestant church

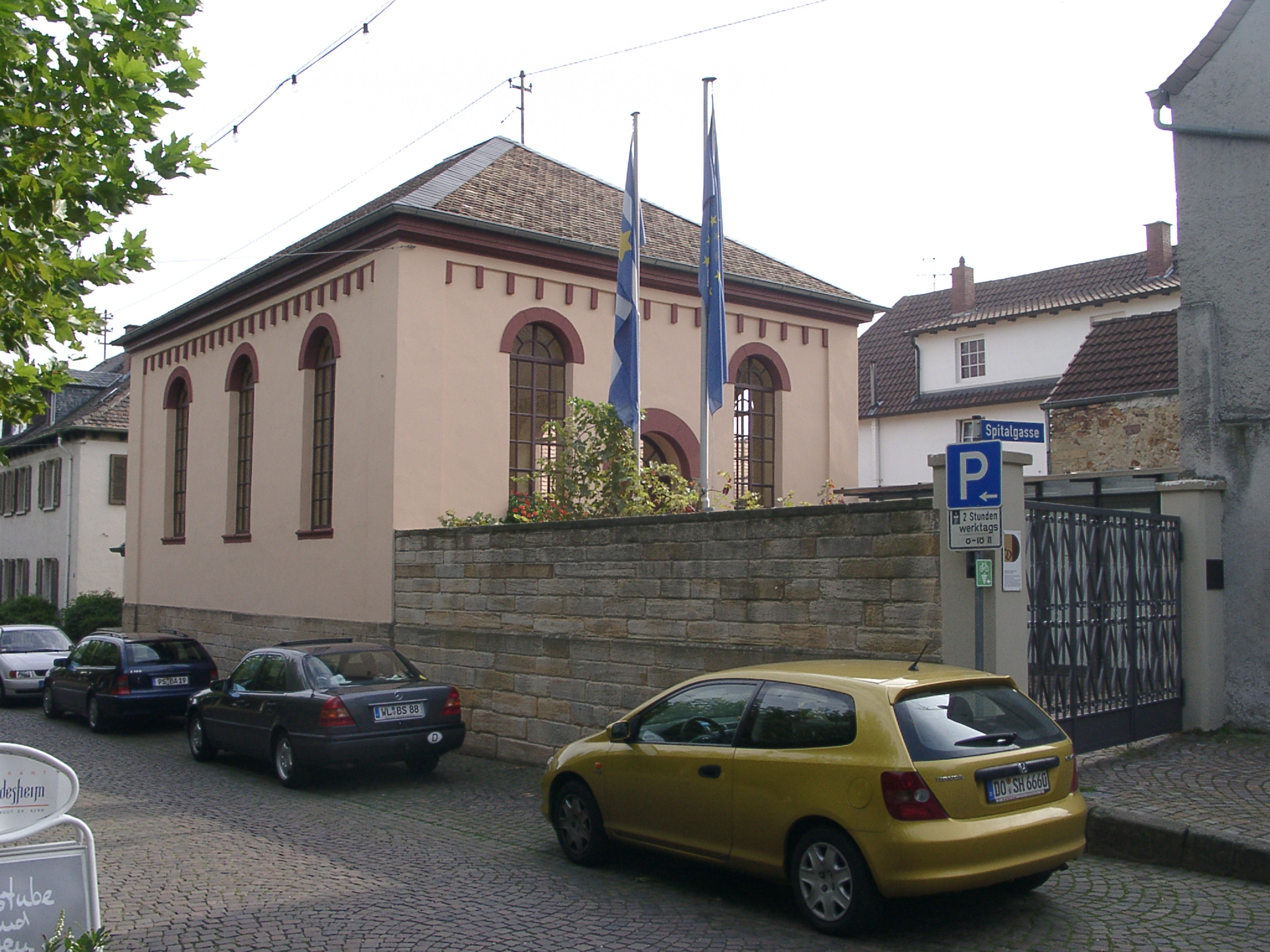
Former synagogue

On the same spot where now stands Saint Ulrich's Parish Church once stood a chapel consecrated to Saint Mary. This chapel was first mentioned about 1300. Owing to the transfer of the parish seat from Niederkirchen bei Deidesheim to Deidesheim sometime between 1437 and 1460, a new, roomier church building was needed. Work on the new building began before the middle of the century, about 1444. In 1473, the work had been finished as far as it could be. Saint Ulrich's Parish Church (Pfarrkirche St. Ulrich) with its 62.7 m-tall, somewhat crooked tower is the only major church building in the Palatinate to have been built in the mid 15th century.

The Reformation could not prevail in the Prince-Bishopric of Speyer, to which Deidesheim belonged and whose bishop was Deidesheim's town lord (cuius regio, eius religio). Nevertheless, it wrought considerable difficulties with the allocation of the Deidesheim rectorate in the latter half of the 16th century. In 1750 and 1820 respectively, the branch parishes of Niederkirchen and Forst were split away from Deidesheim again and were raised to fully-fledged parishes in their own right. For a short time after the French annexation of the Rhine’s left bank, the parish of Deidesheim belonged to the Bishopric of Mainz before being ceded back to the Bishopric of Speyer.

Under the new order of deaconries made in the diocese of Speyer in 1980, Deidesheim was assigned to the deaconry of Bad Dürkheim. Owing to a dearth of priests, Saint Ulrich’s parish has since 2006 formed a parish union with Saint Margaret’s (Forst) and Saint Martin’s (Ruppertsberg) whose seat is in Deidesheim. In late 2007, 2,165 of Deidesheim’s inhabitants were Catholic, which made them 56.87% of the population.

=== Evangelical parish ===
The Protestants’ share of Deidesheim's population was long very slight, with only four in the town in 1788. By 1863 that had risen to 38. In 1874 and 1875, the Protestant church arose from the conversion of a former barn. In 1891, this acquired a tower.

The number of Protestants in town also swelled after the Second World War with the arrival of refugees. Since 1957, Deidesheim has formed its own parish with Forst an der Weinstraße, Niederkirchen bei Deidesheim and Ruppertsberg; the places in Wachenheim an der Weinstraße used to also belong. The Deidesheim parish belongs to the Evangelical Church of the Palatinate (Protestant State Church), and since 1984 has had its own rectorate. In late 2007, 924 of Deidesheim's inhabitants were Evangelical, which made them 24.27% of the population.

=== Jewish community ===
As early as the High Middle Ages, Jews had a community with a synagogue in Deidesheim. The community was wiped out in the pogrom during the time of the plague in 1349 when all Deidesheim's Jews were slain and the synagogue passed into the Church's ownership. In the 16th century a new Jewish community was formed.

Because the prayer hall in use up to that time could no longer be used owing to disrepair, a new synagogue was built. As the persecution of Jews in Nazi Germany increased, many Jews felt forced to emigrate, shrinking and impoverishing the community. In 1935, the synagogue, which was in need of renovation, was sold. Seven Jews who were born or had long lived in Deidesheim were deported in 1940 under the so-called Bürckel-Wagner Action (they were both Gauleiters), even Mrs. Reinach, who had survived Camp Gurs; all were murdered in The Holocaust.

The former Jewish graveyard on Platanenweg is under town ownership. It is some 800 m² in area and is under monumental protection. All together, 95 gravestones from the time between the 18th and 20th centuries could be restored in 1946 after they were destroyed in 1938.

== Politics ==
=== Coat of arms ===
The town's arms might be described thus: Azure a cross pattée humetty argent, in dexter chief and base sinister a mullet Or.

The German blazon mentions nothing about a bordure. The version shown at Heraldry of the World has none, and thus matches the blazon.

Deidesheim's oldest seal, from 1410, showed a cross that was not couped (that is, it reached the escutcheon’s edges, unlike the one in the current arms), standing for the Bishopric of Speyer, and only one mullet (star) in dexter chief, that is, in the upper part of the escutcheon on the dexter (armsbearer’s right, viewer’s left) side. It is believed that the mullet stood for Saint Mary, the patron of the now long-vanished Marienkapelle. With this seal, the Schultheiß, the council and the court of Deidesheim authenticated the documents that they issued. The seal bore the circumscription Gericht von Deidesheim (“Court of Deidesheim”). After Deidesheim's destruction in the Nine Years' War in 1693, a new seal was made. This one bore the circumscription Der * Stat * Deidesheim * Insigel. The heraldic device that it bore was the same as the arms still borne by the town now.

=== Town politics since the 19th century ===
Mayors of Deidesheim since 1895
Time in office	Name
1895 to 1905	Johann Julius Siben
1905 to 1914	Ludwig Bassermann-Jordan
1914 to 1920	Karl Kimich
1920 to 1933	Arnold Siben
1933 to 1945	Friedrich Eckel-Sellmayr
1945 to 1948	Michael Henrich
1948	Heinrich Funk
1948 to 1972	Norbert Oberhettinger
1972 to 1975	Erich Gießen
1975 to 2004	Stefan Gillich
2004 to today	Manfred Dörr

==== Before the First World War ====
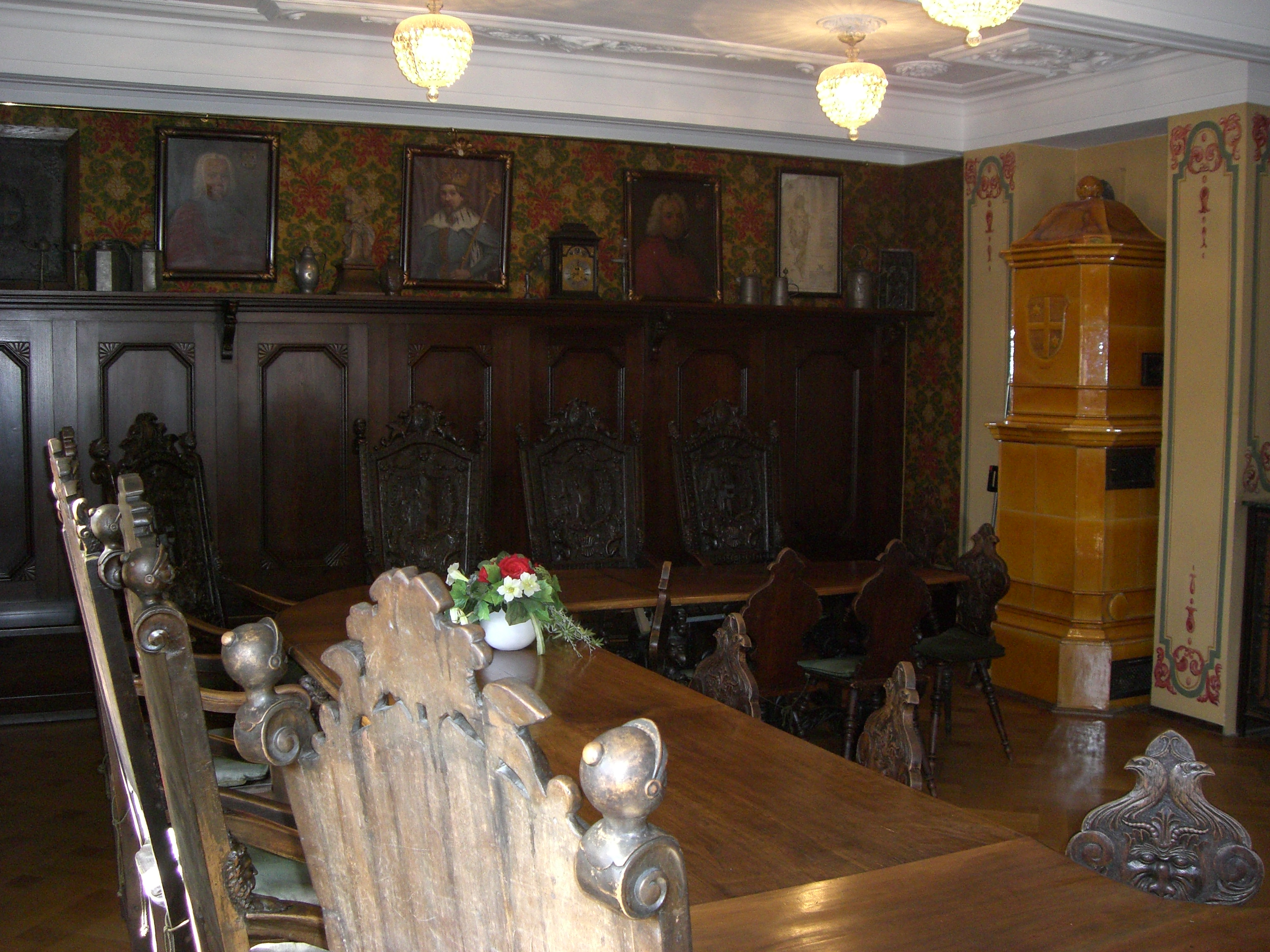
Council chamber in the Historic Town Hall

In the early 19th century in Deidesheim, an influential class of winery estate owners formed who always put forward the honorary mayor, even through to the Weimar Republic’s downfall, and were markedly overrepresented on town council. The actual structure of the town’s population at this time was not reflected on town council. After the First World War, the Bavarian Municipal Act of 1869 still applied at first and the 23-member council elected in 1914 stood unchanged. The last mayor, Ludwig Bassermann-Jordan, had been killed in the war after volunteering for service, and his deputy, Karl Kimich, was elected in his stead. At the next municipal election, though, he did not seek another term.

==== Weimar Republic ====
The most promising candidate to succeed Kimich was said to be Arnold Siben, whose father, Johann Julius Siben, had already been Deidesheim’s mayor from 1895 to 1905. Backing Siben was the Unparteiische Bürgerliste (“Independent Citizens’ List”), which itself brought Centre Party supporters and liberals together. The liberal to left-leaning Bürgerliste and the Volksliste, which was close to the SPD, fixed on the frontrunner, Josef Eid. Siben, however, could decide the election's outcome by himself, and he won a ten-year mandate.

While the 1920 and 1924 municipal elections went forth relatively quietly, the 1929 election was considerably more raucous. This stemmed from a proposal from the Mayor's Office to town council just before the election to raise Siben to full-time, professional mayor. Outrage was the response, for on the one hand, the electorate would thereby be bypassed, and on the other, many found the yearly salary of 12,000 ℛ︁ℳ︁ quite beyond the pale against the backdrop of the Great Depression, which had just broken out. Nonetheless, Siben got just enough votes from the Unparteiische Bürgerliste to become the professional mayor for the next five years. At the next council election, which came shortly thereafter and had an unusually high voter turnout, the Unparteiische Bürgerliste lost almost half its council members, many to the protest movement Fortschritt und Freiheit (“Progress and Freedom”), whose leader, Friedrich Schreck, rose to become the deputy mayor after Siben.

==== Nazi Germany ====
In Deidesheim, the Machtergreifung came mainly on 15 March – the Ides – 1933 in the form of a demonstration by several hundred people outside Siben's house. The crowd threatened to storm the house if Siben was not prepared to surrender the mayor's office. Siben thereupon declared to two town councillors who were there that he was resigning, all the while, however, reserving his rights. The mayoralty would then have fallen to the second mayor Friedrich Schreck; however, he would not have suited those now in power, as he had already twice been interned for resistance against the NSDAP. The Neustadt regional office eventually decreed on 20 March that the estate owner Friedrich Eckel-Sellmayr should be mayor; he had already held a seat on town council since 1924 as part of the Bürgerliste formed by the Left-Liberals and the commercial association. Eckel-Sellmayr held the mayoralty until the end of the Second World War in 1945.

==== After the Second World War ====
Council elections 7 June 2009
Party	Result (%)	Number of seats on council
CDU	55.9 (-3.3)	11 (-1)
FWG	24.3 (+0.1)	5 (=)
Grüne	11.5 (+1.8)	2 (=)
SPD	5.3 (-1.6)	1 (=)
FDP	3.0 (+3.0)	1 (+1)

After the Americans had occupied Deidesheim towards the end of the war in March 1945, they appointed the retired headteacher Michael Henrich mayor; Ernst Fürst became his deputy. On 1 July 1948, Fürst took over the mayoralty for half a year. At the first town council elections after the Second World War on 15 September 1946, the CDU got 62% of the vote, and thereafter always earned over 50% of the vote in municipal elections, putting forth all mayors. At the next municipal election in late 1948, two voters’ groups entered the council for the first time. Thenceforth they played an important rôle in town politics and later joined forces as the Free Voters' Group.

On 1 December 1948, the CDU candidate Norbert Oberhettinger was elected mayor. After the owner of the Reichsrat von Buhl Winery, Karl Theodor Freiherr von und zu Guttenberg, died, Norbert Oberhettinger and his wife were killed in an accident on the way back from the baron's burial. Succeeding him to the mayoralty was the winery owner Erich Gießen, who held office until 1975. After him, Stefan Gillich, who at the time already held the mayoralty of the Verbandsgemeinde of Deidesheim, was elected. The current mayor, Manfred Dörr (CDU) was elected on 13 June 2004, succeeding Stefan Gillich. He furthermore won the 2009 municipal election in which nobody stood against him, earning 81.9% of the votes cast.

The latest municipal election's results, along with the changes in figures from the last one before that are set out in the table at right. These results give the CDU an absolute majority on town council.

=== Deidesheimers in state and Imperial politics ===
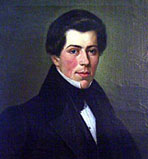
Ludwig Andreas Jordan

Many Deidesheim estate owners were able to use their strong financial bases for activities at higher levels of government. Beginning in the 1840s, Ludwig Andreas Jordan and Franz Peter Buhl gathered liberal politicians in their houses who were of the “Greater German” mindset. The composition of this “Deidesheim Circle” (Deidesheimer Kreis) changed often; to it belonged, among others, Adam von Itzstein, Ludwig Häusser, Heinrich von Sybel, Carl Theodor Welcker, Heinrich von Gagern, Karl Mathy, Friedrich Daniel Bassermann, Carl Joseph Anton Mittermaier and Georg Gottfried Gervinus. In March 1848, Buhl and Jordan sat in the Vorparlament in Frankfurt, a preparatory gathering for the Frankfurt Parliament, which neither one attended, Buhl because he was not elected and Jordan because he wanted to remain Mayor of Deidesheim. No later than the Second Schleswig War in 1864, the Deidesheim Circle's mindset had changed to a “Lesser German” one.

After the German Empire was founded in 1871, two Deidesheimers were elected as Members of the Reichstag: Ludwig Andreas Jordan, a Member until 1881, and Franz Armand Buhl, who held a mandate until 1893 and functioned for three years as Deputy Speaker of the Reichstag. He played a part in Bismarck's social and wine legislation. In Andreas Deinhard, Deidesheim also had another of its sons in the Reichstag as a Member. He held a mandate from 1898 to 1903. Buhl, Jordan and Deinhard were all members of the National Liberal Party.

Three Deidesheimers held seats in the Chamber of Imperial Councillors (Kammer der Reichsräte) of the Kingdom of Bavaria: Franz Armand Buhl (from 1885 to 1896), Eugen Buhl (from 1896 to 1910) and Franz Eberhard Buhl (from 1911 to 1918). In the Bavarian Chamber of Deputies (Kammer der Abgeordneten), eight Deidesheimers were represented all together: Andreas Jordan (from 1831 to 1843), Ludwig Andreas Jordan (from 1848 to 1852 and from 1863 to 1871), Franz Peter Buhl (from 1855 to 1861), Eugen Buhl (from 1875 to 1896), Franz Eberhard Buhl (from 1907 to 1911), Andreas Deinhard (from 1881 to 1904), Johann Julius Siben (from 1899 to 1907), and Josef Siben (from 1907 to 1920). Besides the eight resident Members, there were also two other Members of the Bavarian Chamber of Deputies who had been born in Deidesheim: Josef Giessen (from 1907 to 1918) and Franz Tafel (from 1840 to 1843, from 1849 to 1858 and from 1863 to 1869). The latter also had a seat in the Frankfurt Parliament.

After the Second World War, one more Deidesheimer went into state politics: Hanns Haberer, who was born in Bruchmühlbach and now lived in his wife's hometown, was Economics and Finance Minister from 1946 to 1947 in Rhineland-Palatinate’s first government and from 1947 to 1955 functioned as Secretary of State.

=== Town partnerships ===
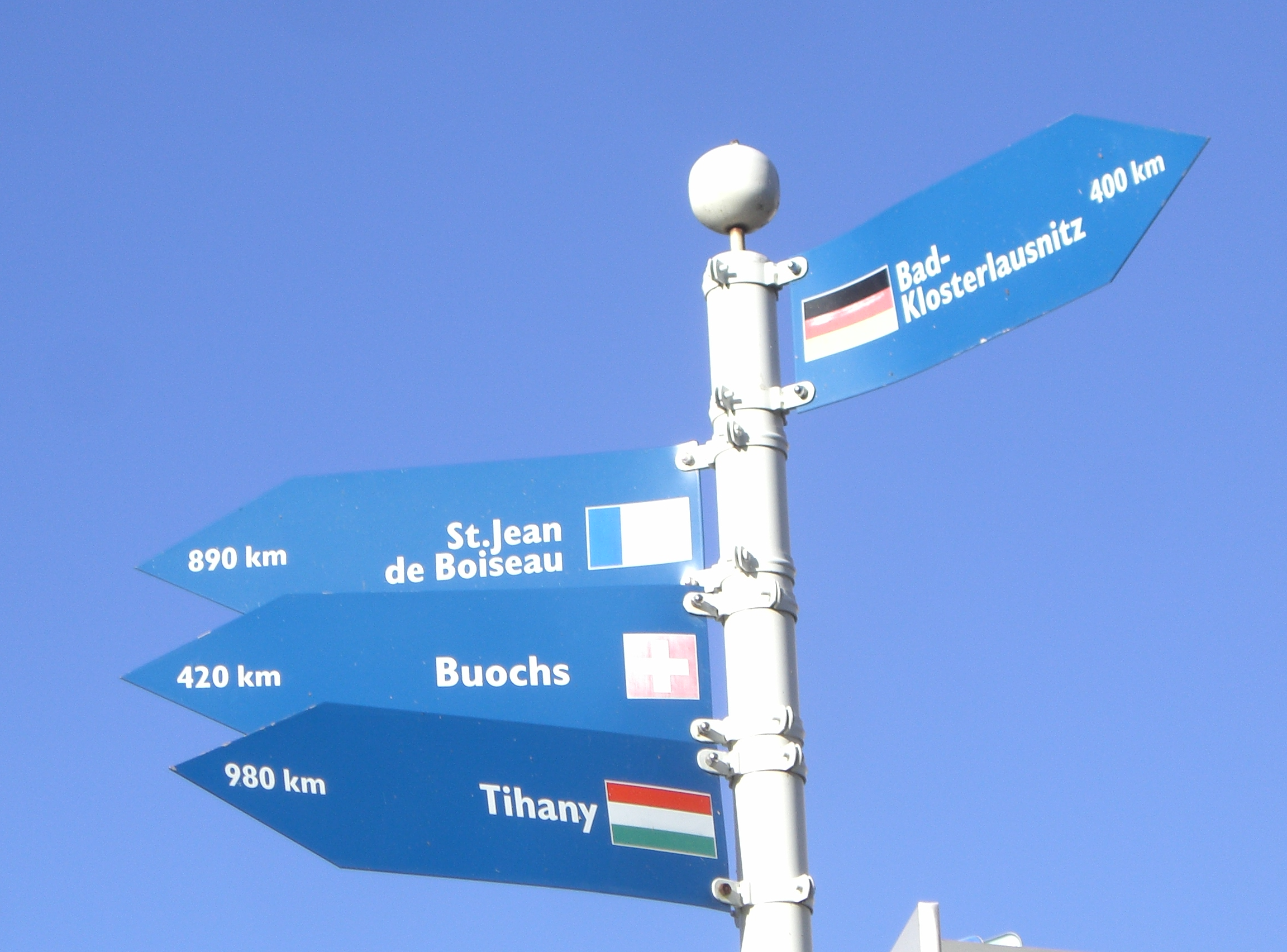
Partner towns with distances

Deidesheim maintains town partnerships with the following towns:

- Saint-Jean-de-Boiseau, Loire-Atlantique, France
- (Germany) Bad Klosterlausnitz, Thuringia
- Buochs, Nidwalden, Switzerland
- Tihany, Veszprém County, Hungary

=== Consular representation ===
- Deidesheim is home to the Honorary Consulate of the Republic of Togo.

== Culture and sightseeing ==
=== Buildings ===
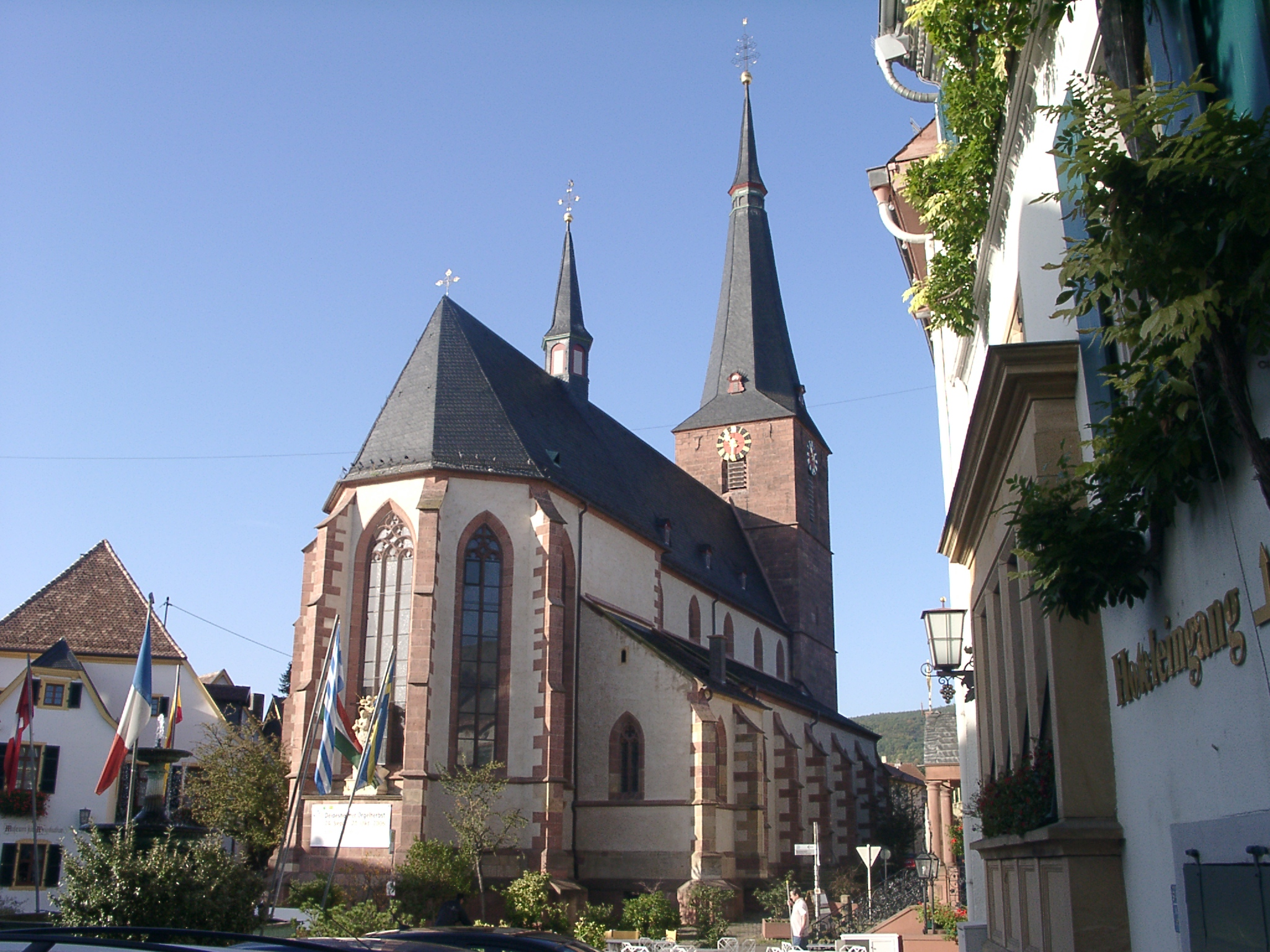
St. Ulrich's Parish Church

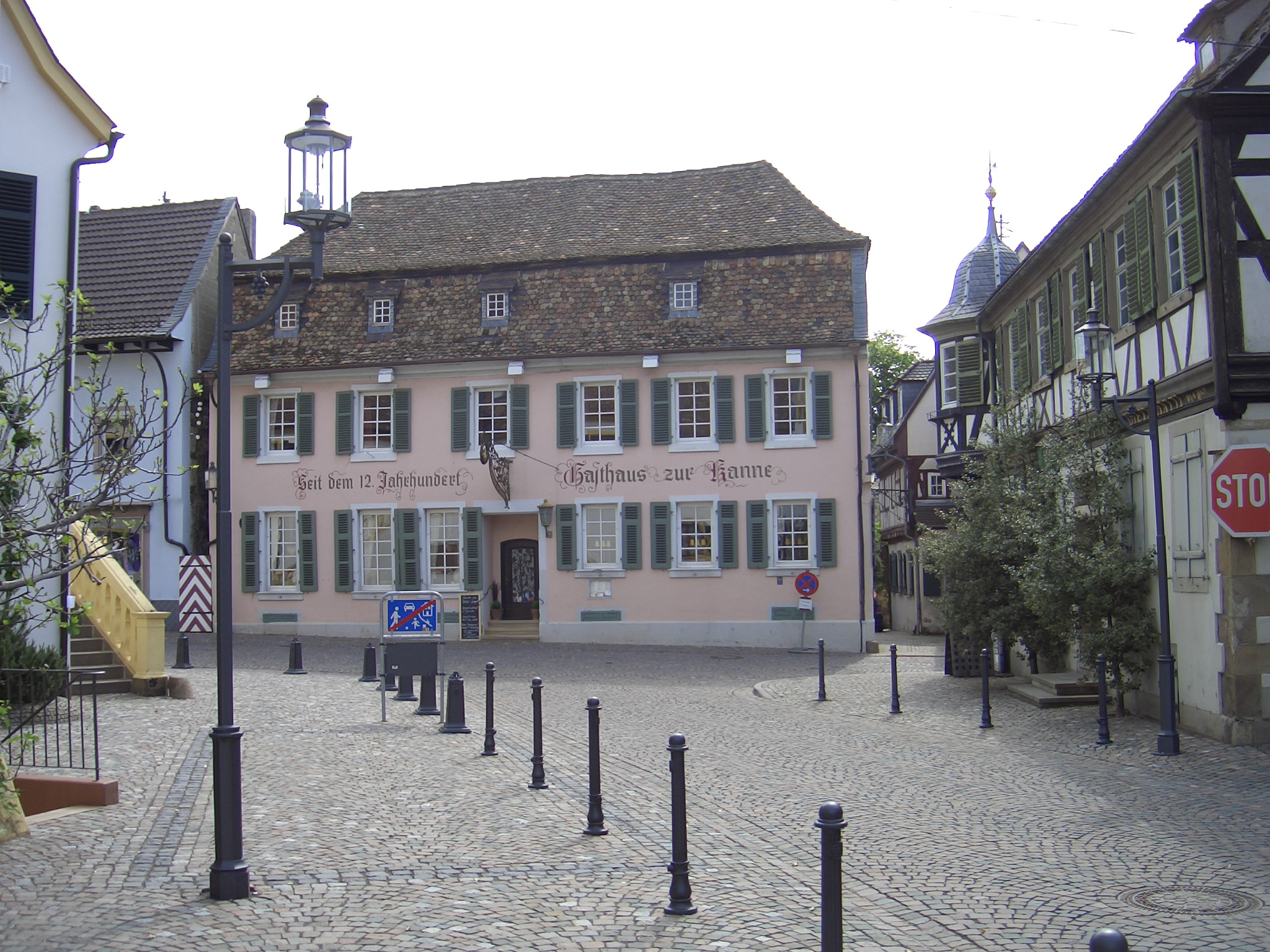
Gasthaus zur Kanne (inn)

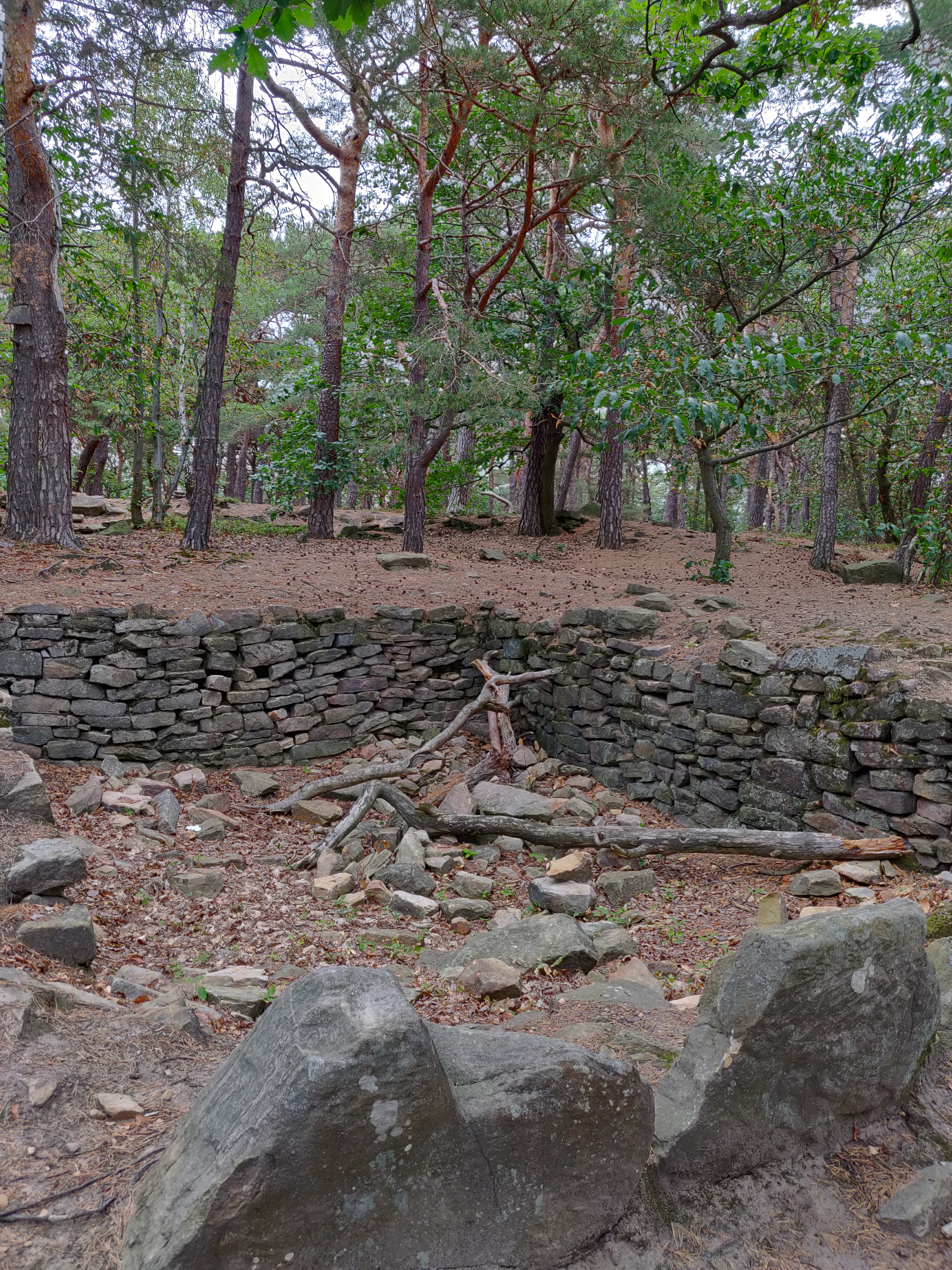
Heidenloch

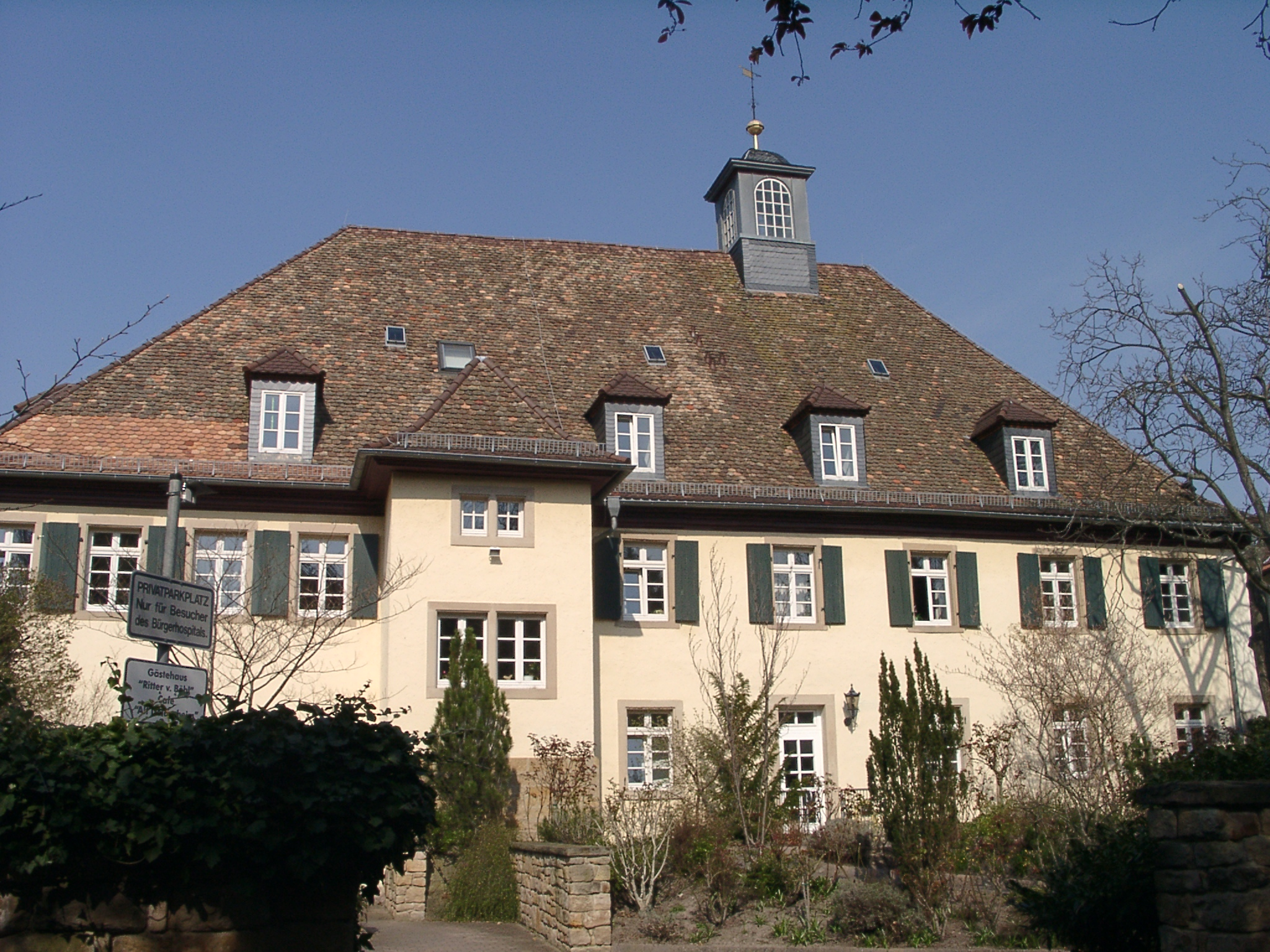
Deidesheimer Spital

==== Saint Ulrich’s Parish Church ====
The Late Gothic Catholic Saint Ulrich's Parish Church was built between 1440 and 1480 as a successor to an older Chapel of Saint Mary. It is a three-naved groin-vaulted column basilica and the Palatinate's only major church building preserved from the mid 15th century. The church is counted among the most important witnesses to Late Gothic architecture in the Palatinate by the Bad Dürkheim district's catalogue of memorial sites.

==== Gasthaus zur Kanne ====
This inn was built about 1160 as an estate of the Cistercian Eußerthal Abbey to lodge and entertain travellers. From this branch location of the Abbey grew today's inn, whose innkeepers and leaseholders can be traced back in an unbroken line to the year 1374. The inn is therefore said to be the Palatinate’s oldest. Today the inn is run by the Wachenheim winery Weingut Dr. Bürklin-Wolf.

==== Castle Deidesheim ====
Castle Deidesheim (Schloss Deidesheim) was built in the 13th century when Deidesheim still belonged to the Prince-Bishopric of Speyer. It was likely the seed from which sprang today’s town of Deidesheim, and was the seat of the Speyer Episcopal administration. Because it has been destroyed twice, the castle has been subject to profound building alterations.

==== Heidenlöcher ====
On the Martensberg (mountain), some 2.5 km (1.6 mi) northwest of Deidesheim, are found the Heidenlöcher (singular: Heidenloch – “heathen holes”), the ruins of a refuge castle, which once offered Deidesheimers shelter to which they could flee in times of war. It is believed to have been built in the 9th or 10th century, but never used for its intended purpose. Its utterly ruined state today is merely from the ravages of time, not war.

==== Deidesheimer Spital ====
The Deidesheimer Spital is a short-term residence for seniors with a 500-year history full of changes. It was endowed by the Deidesheim knight Nikolaus von Böhl and served over time as both a civilian and military hospital. In an air raid on the Spital in the Second World War, nine people lost their lives. Since 1994 the Café Alt Deidesheim has belonged to it as a “meeting place of the generations”, as has the Gästehaus „Ritter von Böhl“ (inn), whose proceeds go to benefit the Spital.

==== Former synagogue ====
The former synagogue was built in the mid 19th century by the Jewish community. With its dissolution under Nazi Germany, the building was liquidated and used for a few decades as a storehouse. In the late 1980s, the building was placed under monumental protection and later bought by the town of Deidesheim. Since its renovation about the turn of the millennium, the former synagogue has been used for cultural events.

==== Historic Town Hall ====
The Historic Town Hall (Historisches Rathaus) was built in 1532. After sustaining heavy damage in the Nine Years' War, it was built, this time in the Baroque style. Its twin outdoor stairways with its “baldachin” porch come from 1724. The historic council chamber inside was done in Renaissance Revival style in 1912. Stained glass in the windows from the same year shows the coats of arms of resident landed families. In the building has been since 1986 the Museum für Weinkultur, whose exhibits reflect the history of winegrowing.

==== Fountains ====
- The Geißbockbrunnen (“Billygoat Fountain”) from 1985 was created by sculptor Gernot Rumpf. It can be found in the Deidesheim Town Square (Stadtplatz) across from the Stadthalle (literally “town hall”, but actually an event venue) and follows the theme of the Geißbockversteigerung (see Regular events below), which is held in Deidesheim each year on Whit Tuesday.
- The Andreasbrunnen (“Andrew’s Fountain”) on the Deidesheim Marketplace (Marktplatz) comes from 1851 and was endowed by Ludwig Andreas Jordan and his kin. It is named for his father Andreas Jordan (1775–1848), Deidesheim's former mayor and a trailblazer for producing Qualitätsweine in the Palatinate. The fountain was poured by the Gienanthsche Hütte (foundry) in Eisenberg and is based on Italian Renaissance models.
- The Geschichts- und Brauchtumsbrunnen (“History and Tradition Fountain”) at the Königsgarten (“King’s Garden”) shows on the one hand important junctures in Deidesheim's history, such as the granting of town rights or the lordship of the Prince-Bishopric of Speyer, and on the other hand it recognizes local clubs who give themselves over to upholding traditions, such as the costume group and the Kerwebuwe (“kermis lads”). The fountain was created by sculptor Karl Seiter and finished in 2003.
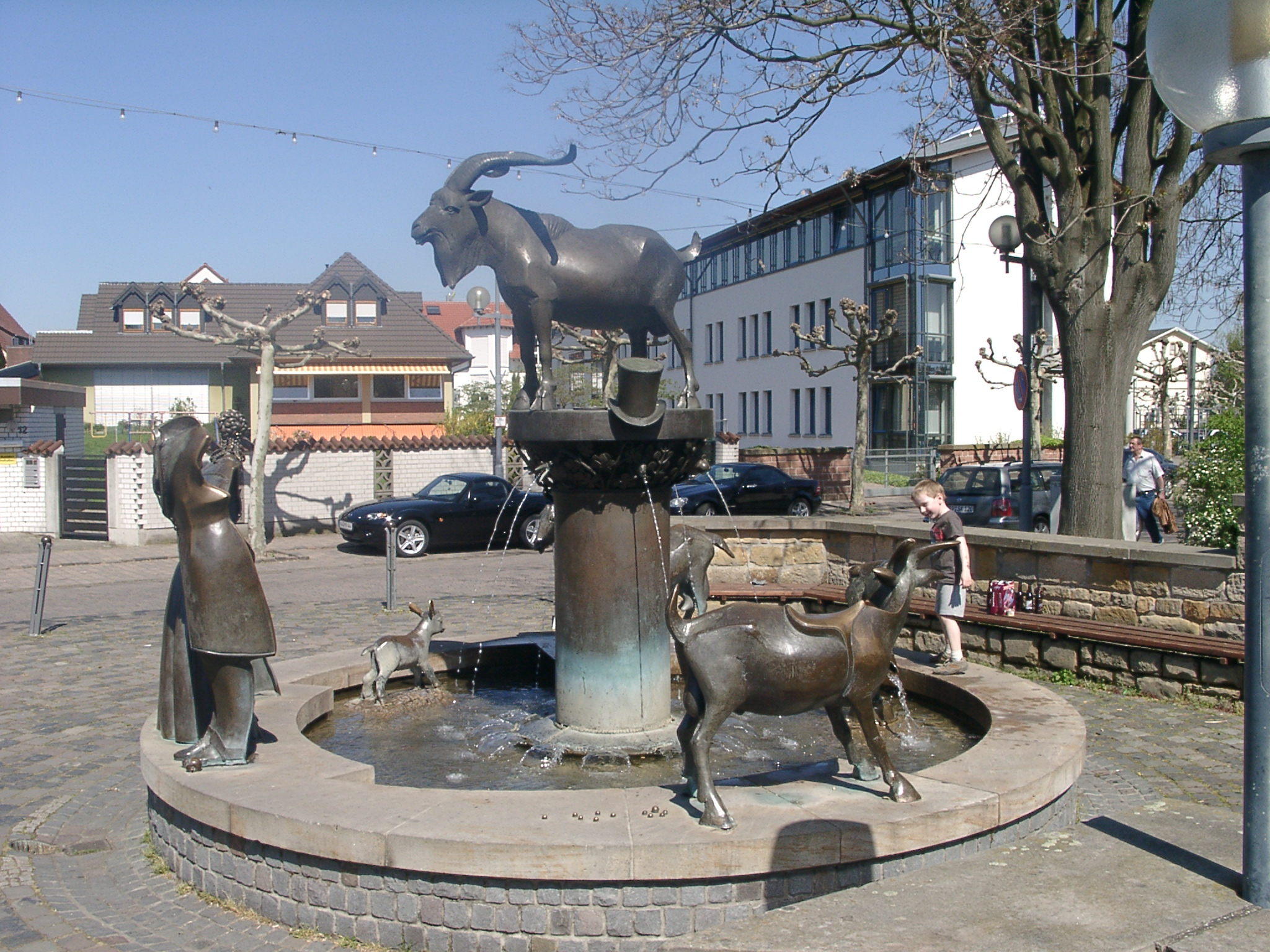
Geißbockbrunnen

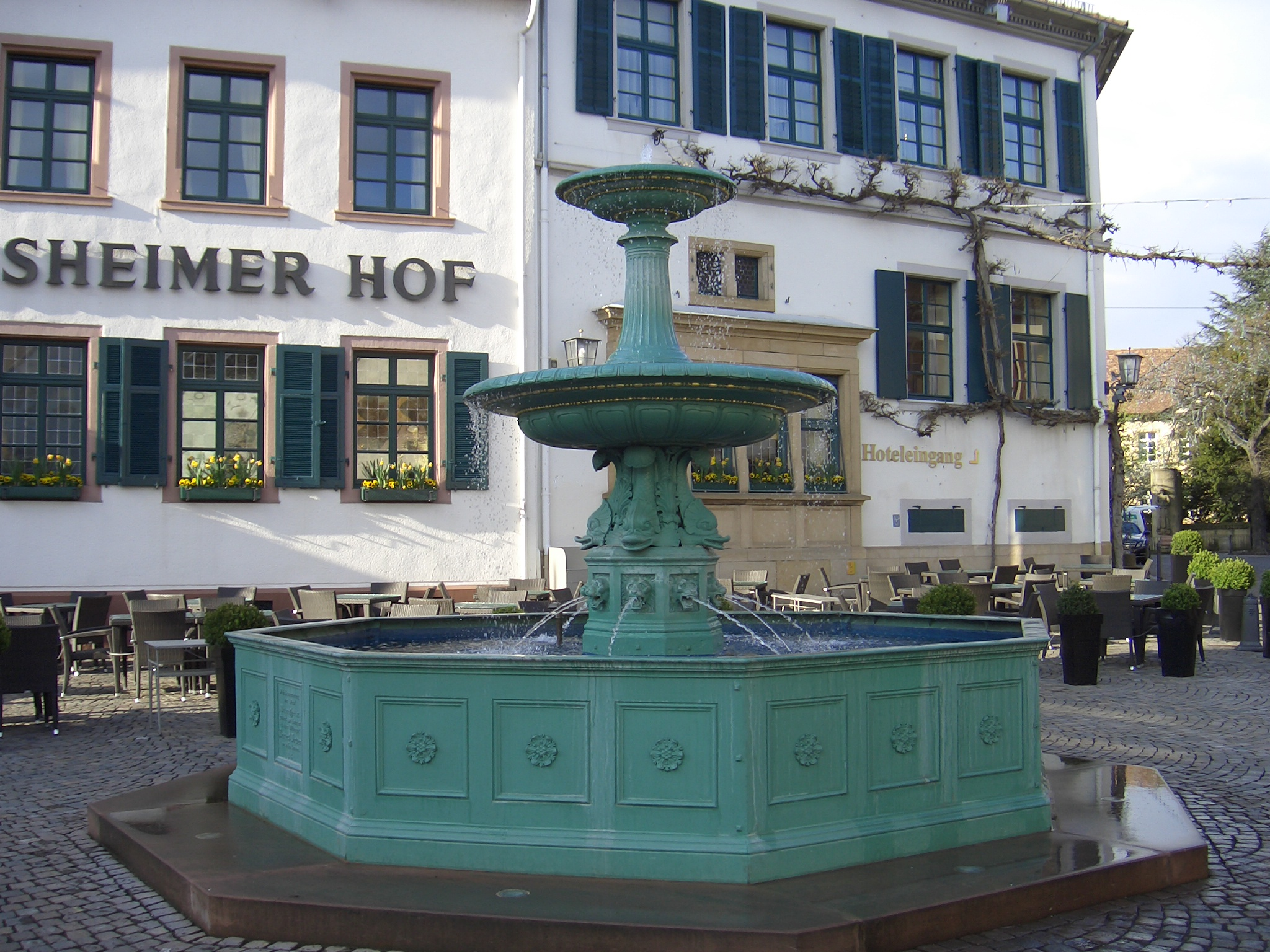
Andreasbrunnen

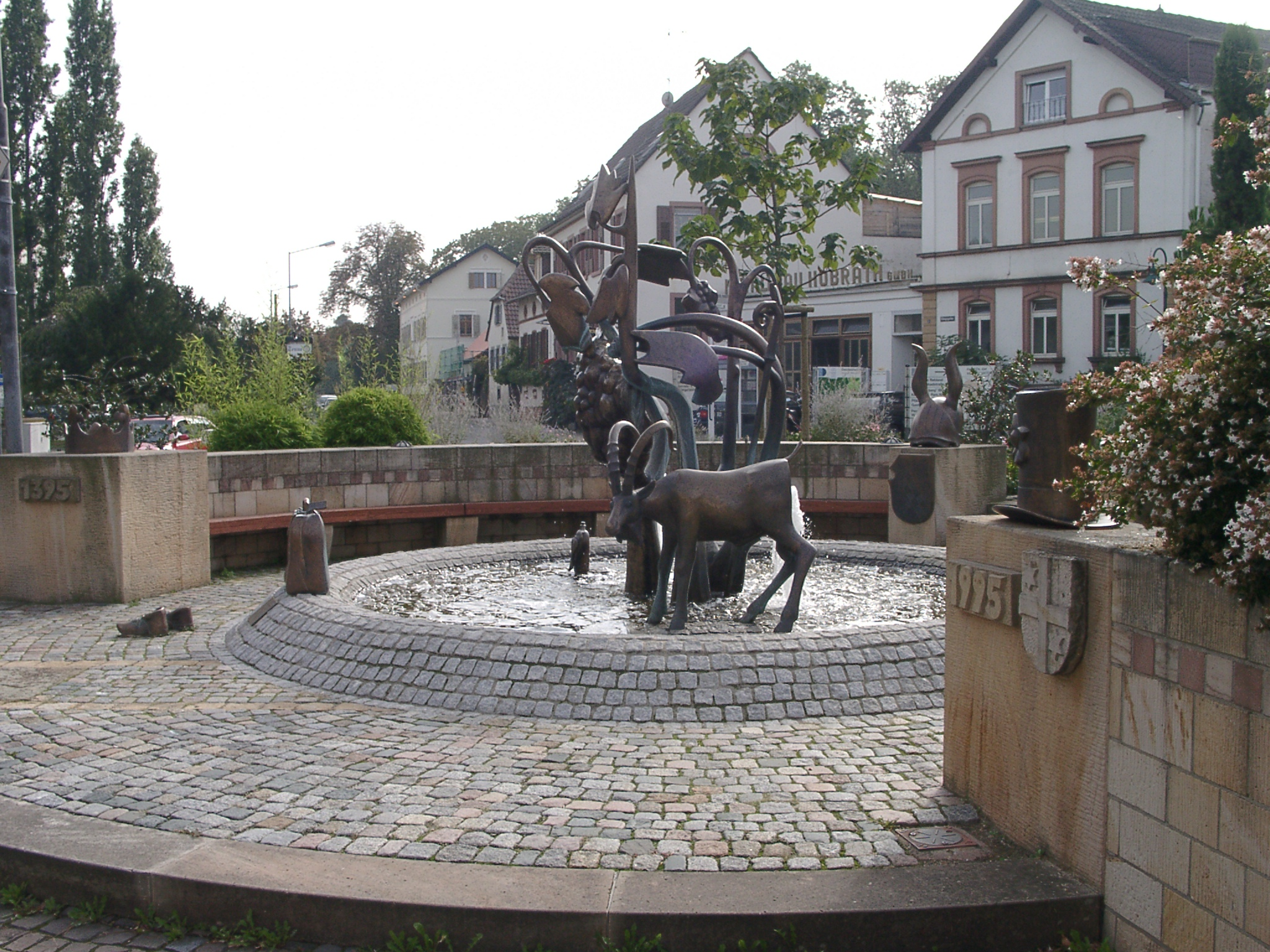
Brauchtumsbrunnen

=== Regular events ===
==== Geißbockversteigerung ====
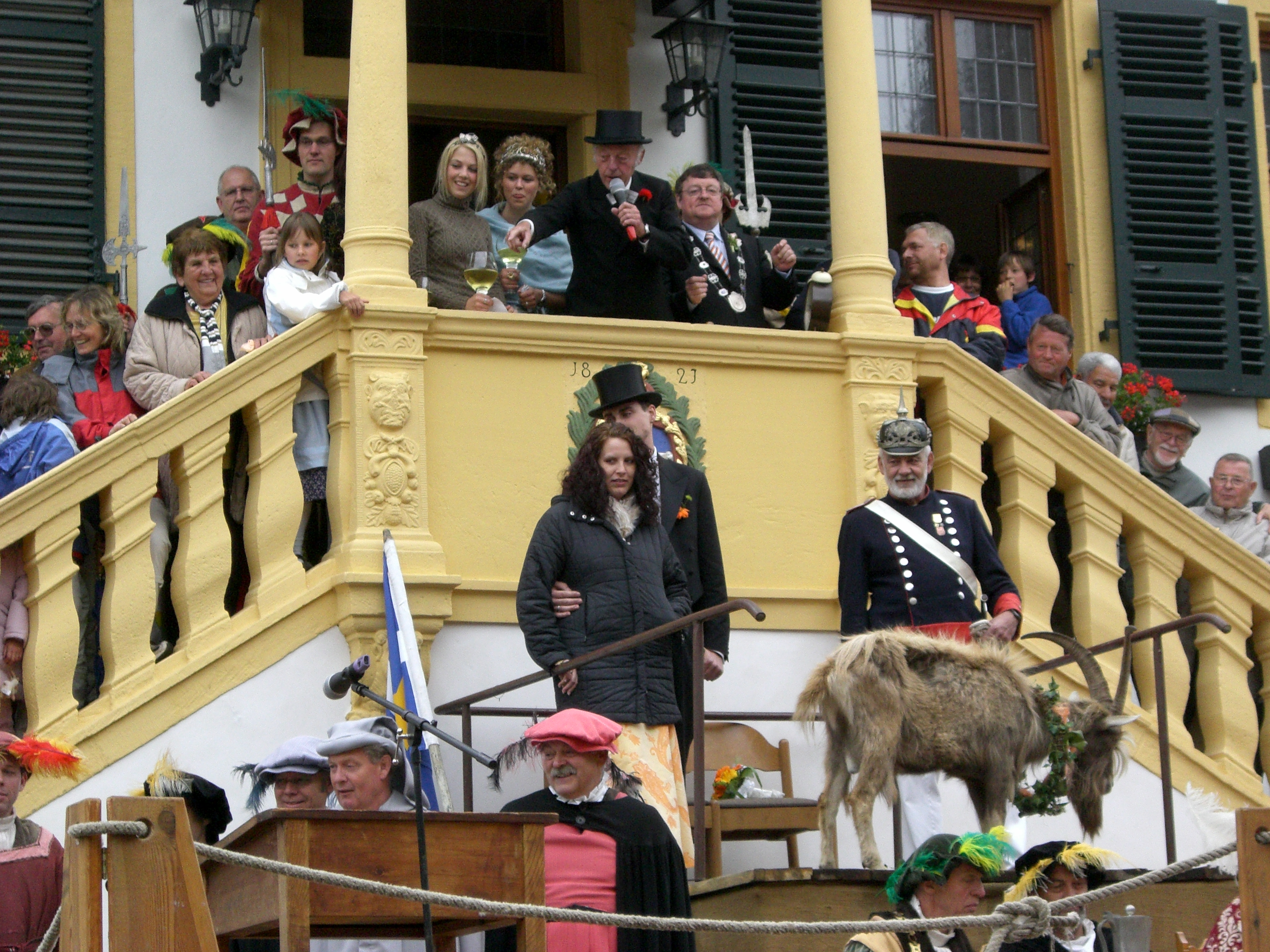
Billygoat Auction

The Geißbockversteigerung (literally “Billygoat Auction”) is a folk festival in the form of a historical game that is celebrated each year on the Tuesday after Whitsun. The festival began with an old agreement with the neighbouring municipality of Lambrecht under which each year to pay off debts for woodland and meadow rights within Deidesheim's limits, a billygoat had to be delivered by Lambrecht, which was then auctioned, with the proceeds going to Deidesheim's benefit. This historical situation grew over time into a folk festival.

==== Deidesheim wine fair ====
The Deidesheimer Weinkerwe is a wine festival, and with over 100,000 visitors is the town's biggest folk festival. It has been celebrated in its current form since 1972 and quickly grew into one of the biggest wine festivals along the German Wine Route. The festival is always held on the second and third weekends of August, each time from Friday to Tuesday. At the fair, wineries and clubs from throughout the Verbandsgemeinde run temporary bars.

==== Advent ====
The Deidesheimer Advent is a Christmas market held on the four weekends in Advent. It has been held since 1975. More than 100 sellers from Deidesheim and the surrounding area run stalls, which must stylistically fit into the market's whole theme. The handicrafts, such as goldsmithing, ceramic, textile, woodcarving and glassblowing crafts play an important rôle in the Deidesheimer Advent. For the mulled wine that is served then, only wines from the Verbandsgemeinde of Deidesheim may be used, which also applies to the wine fair.

==== Lesser events ====
- The Pfälzer Mineralienbörse (“Palatinate Mineral Exchange”) has been held each year since 1971 on the weekend after Whitsun at the Stadthalle.
- The Deidesheimer Orgelherbst (“Organ Autumn”), a series of concerts under church musician Elke Voelker, has been held every year since 1996 in October over several Sundays at the Catholic Parish Church.
- Twice each year, the Film- und Fotobörse (“Film and Photo Exchange”) is held at the Stadthalle at which objects from the fields of photography, film and projection are displayed and traded.

=== Museums ===
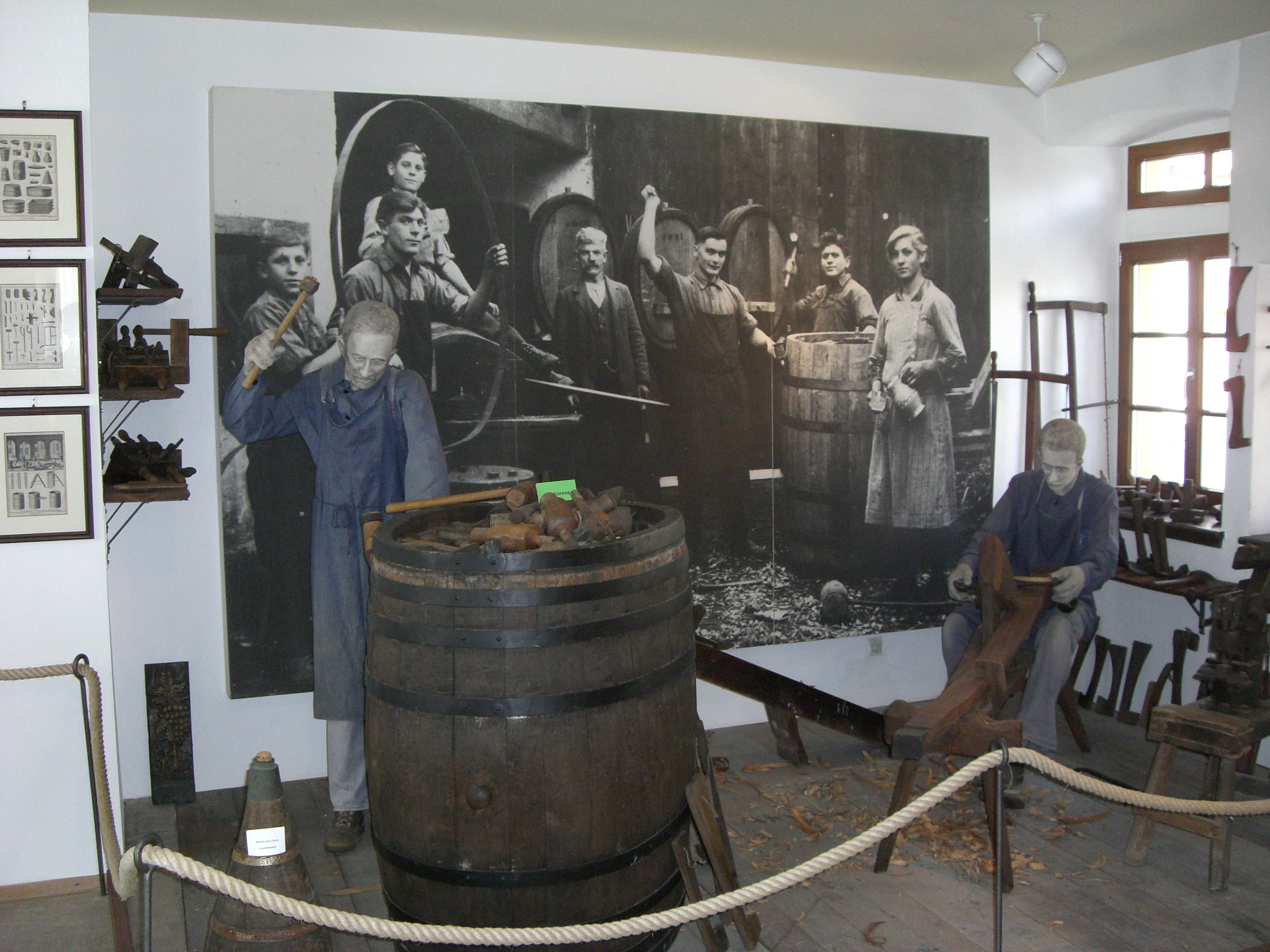
Museum für Weinkultur

- The Museum für Weinkultur is housed at the Historic Town Hall; it was opened in 1986. The museum's exhibited pieces reflect wine's cultural history and influence in fields such as literature, science, art and religion. The museum is financed by, among other things, contributions from the vineyard leaseholders at the Prominenten vineyard in the Deidesheimer Paradiesgarten.
- The Deutsches Film- und Fototechnik Museum is found slightly slantwise across the street from the Historic Town Hall in the rooms of the Deidesheimer Spital; it was opened in December 1990. In some 300 m² are displayed more than 4,000 exhibits from all epochs of camera technology. The museum receives donated objects from, among others, Agfa, Kodak and Arri, but also from television operations such as ZDF and Südwestrundfunk.

=== Deidesheimer Turmschreiber ===
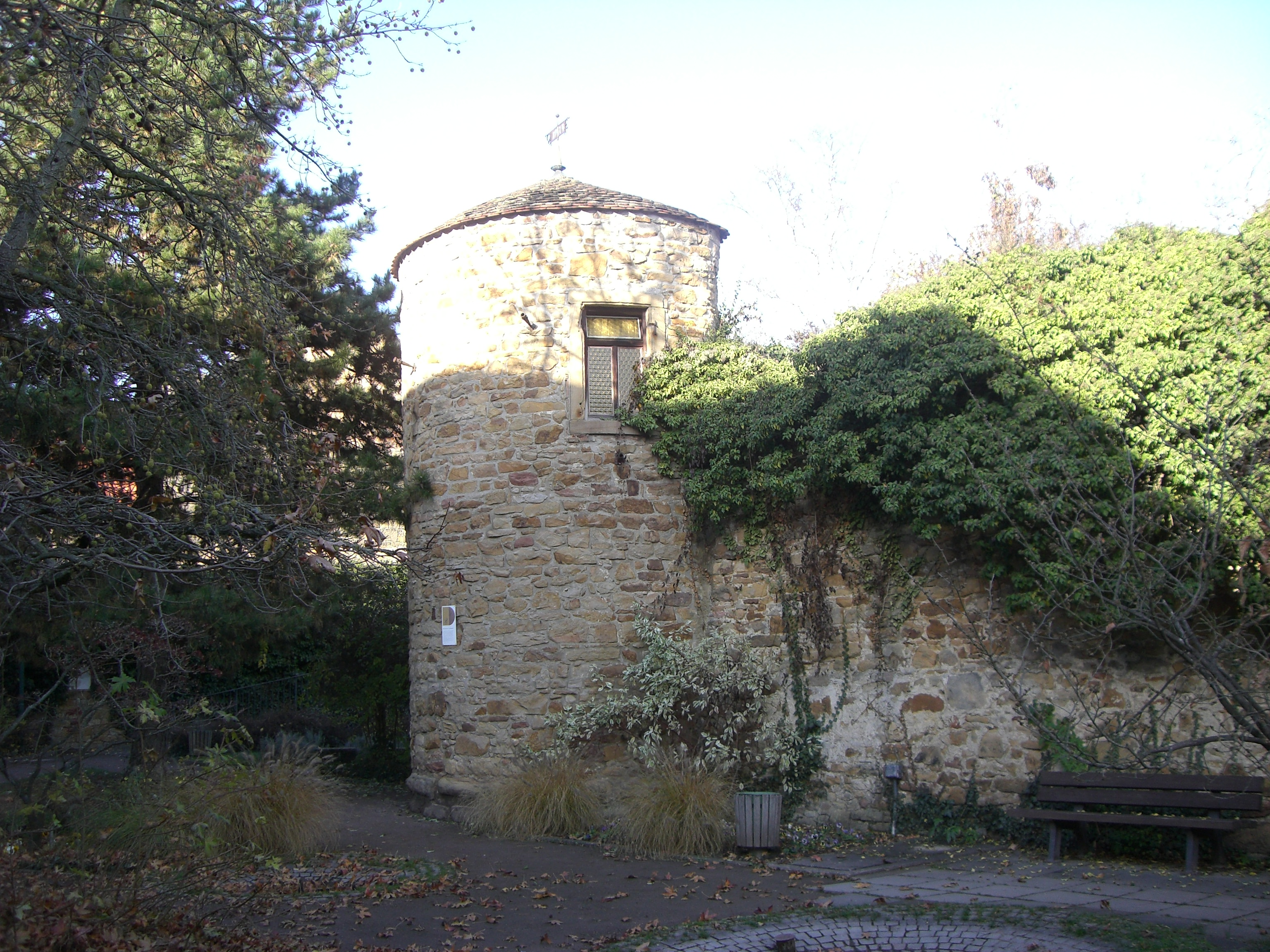
Symbolic residence of the Deidesheimer Turmschreiber

The Stiftung zur Förderung der Literatur in der Pfalz (“Foundation for Furthering Literature in the Palatinate”), in existence since 1978, invites well known men and women of letters every one to five years so that they can write “with a Palatine bearing” and thereafter publish the fruits of their labour. The foundation is financed by the Deutsche Akademie für Sprache und Dichtung (“German Academy for Language and Poetry”), Südwestrundfunk, the state of Rhineland-Palatinate and the town of Deidesheim. Candidates for the office are selected by the foundation's members. Because the writers, at least symbolically, reside in a little turret in the Castle Park (Schlosspark) of the former Castle Deidesheim (Schloss Deidesheim) during the term of their creative endeavours, they are called Turmschreiber (“Tower Writers”). The fund for this is endowed with €7,500. Recipients get a free stay in Deidesheim for a duration of four weeks and a three-bottle-a-day allowance in wine and become a vineyard leaseholder in the Prominenten vineyard in the Deidesheimer Paradiesgarten. Following is a list of all the “Tower Writers” thus far, their works, and the year in which each was in Deidesheim:

- Wolfgang Altendorf (1978; “Wie ein Vogel im Paradiesgarten”)
- Rudolf Hagelstange (1980; “Liebesreim auf Deidesheim”)
- Ludwig Harig (1982; “Zum Schauen bestellt”)
- Herbert Heckmann (1987; “Sieben Weinpredigten”)
- Walter Helmut Fritz (1991; “Die Schlüssel sind vertauscht”)
- Manuel Thomas (1992; no publication yet)
- Hans-Martin Gauger (1996; no publication yet)
- André Weckmann (1998; “Der Geist aus der Flasche und die Leichtigkeit der Zuversicht”)
- Emma Guntz (2001; “Ein Jahr Leben”)
- Fanny Morweiser (2003; “Deidesheimer Elegie oder wie man keinen Krimi schreibt”)
- Bernd Kohlhepp (2006; “Der Ring des Piraten”)

== Economy and infrastructure ==
=== Winegrowing ===
==== Vineyards ====
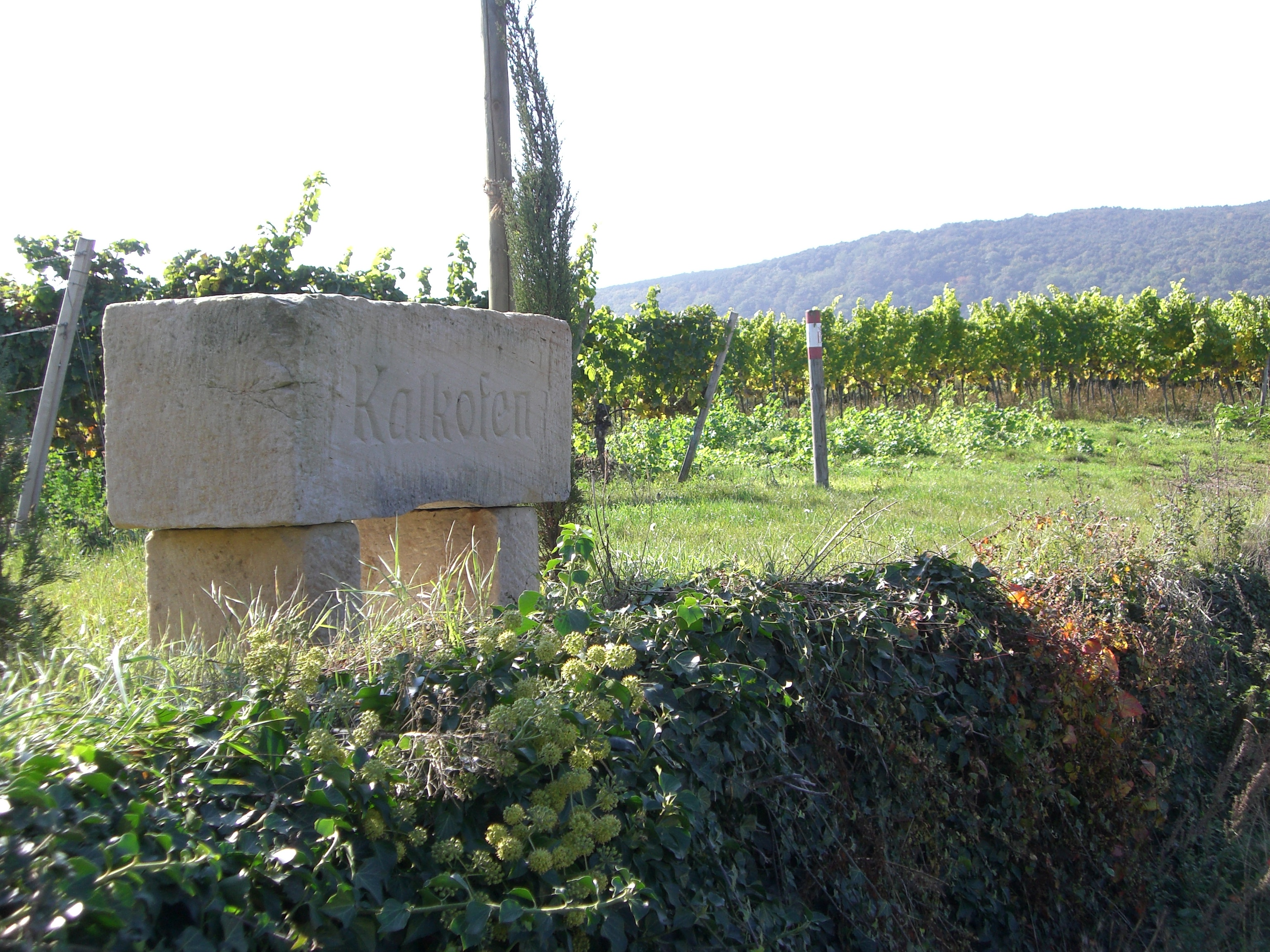
Deidesheimer Kalkofen

Deidesheim vineyards belong to the Palatinate wine region, and also to the Mittelhaardt-Deutsche Weinstraße winegrowing area (Anbaubereich). Local vineyard names used to be borne in ownership documents that described the plots’ locations and their boundaries. Some 170 vineyards and plots of greatly varying size are known to have been within the limits of Deidesheim, Niederkirchen, Forst and Ruppertsberg; they stretched partly across municipal boundaries as they now exist (they were not assigned until 1829). With the amendment to the Rhineland-Palatinate Wine Law in 1971, the Deidesheim vineyards were newly organized. Today there are eleven “single locations” – Einzellagen – and one winemaking appellation – Weingroßlage: the Einzellagen are Grainhübel, Herrgottsacker, Hohenmorgen, Kalkofen (whose name, oddly enough, means “lime kiln”), Kieselberg, Langenmorgen, Leinhöhe, Letten, Mäushöhle, Nonnenstück and Paradiesgarten; the Weingroßlage is called Hofstück. All together, the Einzellagen have an area of 523.58 ha; the Weingroßlage, to which belong many other Einzellagen in other centres, has an area of 1 401 ha. No longer to be found since the reorganization are names such as Geheu, Hahnenböhl, Kränzler, Reiß, Rennpfad, Vogelsang and Weinbach.

==== Winegrowing history ====
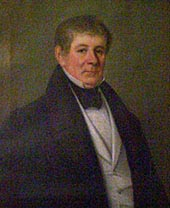
Andreas Jordan

Long before there were domesticated grapes, wild grapes grew in the area around Deidesheim. Witnessing this are remains of vines from some 4,500,000 years ago found about 10 km (6 mi) north of Deidesheim near[[[Ungstein]] [[[:de:[Ungstein|de]]]. It is said to be certain, however, that wine was being made in Central Europe no earlier than the beginning of the Christian Era. Whether it was being done at Deidesheim at this time is a matter of speculation: Finds of wine amphorae and a barrel-shaped glass jug from Roman times near Deidesheim and Ruppertsberg do indeed suggest that wine was being enjoyed at this time. Unambiguous evidence of any winegrowing right near Deidesheim in Roman times, however, is lacking.

About winegrowing in the Middle Ages little is known. In 770, Deidesheim was named for the first time in a document from Fulda Abbey as being a winegrowing centre. Today's vineyards in Deidesheim were only cleared after the turn of the second millennium. The change in land use can be seen in neighbouring placenames Forst (“forest”) and Haardt. With the so-called Ungeld (“unmoney”), a tax on wine allowed by the Prince-Bishop of Speyer in 1360, the town wall's building and maintenance were financed. The earliest mention of a grape variety in Deidesheim was in 1504, when Gänsfüßer (Argant) was named.

In the early 19th century, an important change took hold in winegrowing in the Palatinate. The Deidesheim landowner Andreas Jordan therein became the first to produce Qualitätswein. Well known to him was the worth of the late harvest of noble-rot-bearing grapes at Schloss Johannisberg, and this selective principle he also followed in his own winery. Moreover, he first used, along with vintage and variety, the location name “Deidesheimer Geheu” as a trademark for his wines. As a result of this striving for quality, which later the other local winemakers also made their own, Deidesheim wines earned themselves great repute in the 19th century.

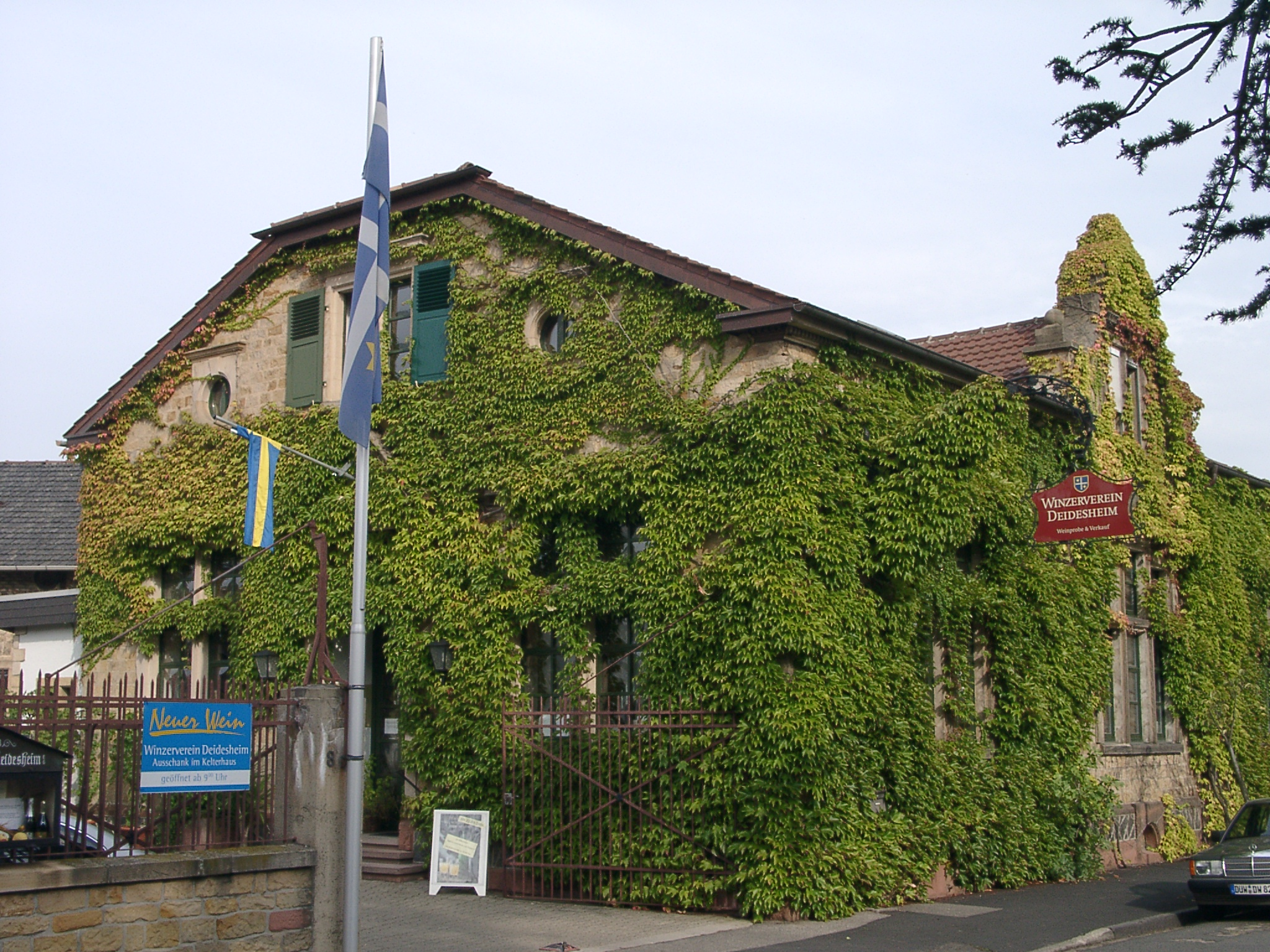
Deidesheim Winemakers’ Association

By implementing his ideas in production and marketing, Andreas managed to earn Qualitätswein prizes, becoming very wealthy and able to expand his winery appreciably. When he died in 1848, his bequest was split three ways – an event known as the Jordansche Teilung (Teilung means “division” or “sharing” in German) – giving rise to Deidesheim's three biggest wineries, which thenceforth developed independently of each other and still exist today. They bear the names Geheimer Rat Dr. von Bassermann-Jordan, Reichsrat von Buhl and Dr. Deinhard.

Because many smaller winemakers were hit hard in the wake of cheap imports and rising labour costs due to the emerging industrialization in the late 19th century, the Deidesheim Winemakers’ Association (Deidesheimer Winzerverein) was founded in 1898 on schoolteacher Johannes Mungenast's initiative. It was the Palatinate’s first winemakers’ association. The winemakers who joined were offered a common wine cellar and common marketing. A further association, formed by small winemakers in 1913, was the Winzergenossenschaft, which merged with the Winzerverein in 1966.

Beginning in 1972 – and therefore somewhat later than in other parts of the Palatinate – a Flurbereinigung process was undertaken near Deidesheim, which gave the area a new look. The last Flurbereinigung operation was finished in 2007. These processes allowed winemakers to save on the cost of harvesting, as this could now more easily be done with tractors and harvesting machines.

==== Winegrowing today ====
Just like Deidesheim's secondary economic underpinning, tourism, winegrowing, too, profits to a great extent from the Weinstraße region's natural particularity, namely the extraordinarily favourable climate. In Deidesheim, there are many wineries, a Sekt cellar and a winemakers’ association. There are 85 winegrowing operations each cultivating an area of at least 0.3 ha. All together, working vineyards cover 485 ha, making the average for each operation 3.7 ha. At this time, 83.7% of the whole area is planted with white wine varieties, while the other 16.3% is planted with red, although the percentage of red is rising; in the early 1980s, the red's share of the vineyards lay at less than 2%. By far the most widely planted variety is Riesling, with other wines being produced here mainly from Müller-Thurgau, Silvaner, Pinot noir, Portugieser and Gewürztraminer varieties.

=== Tourism ===
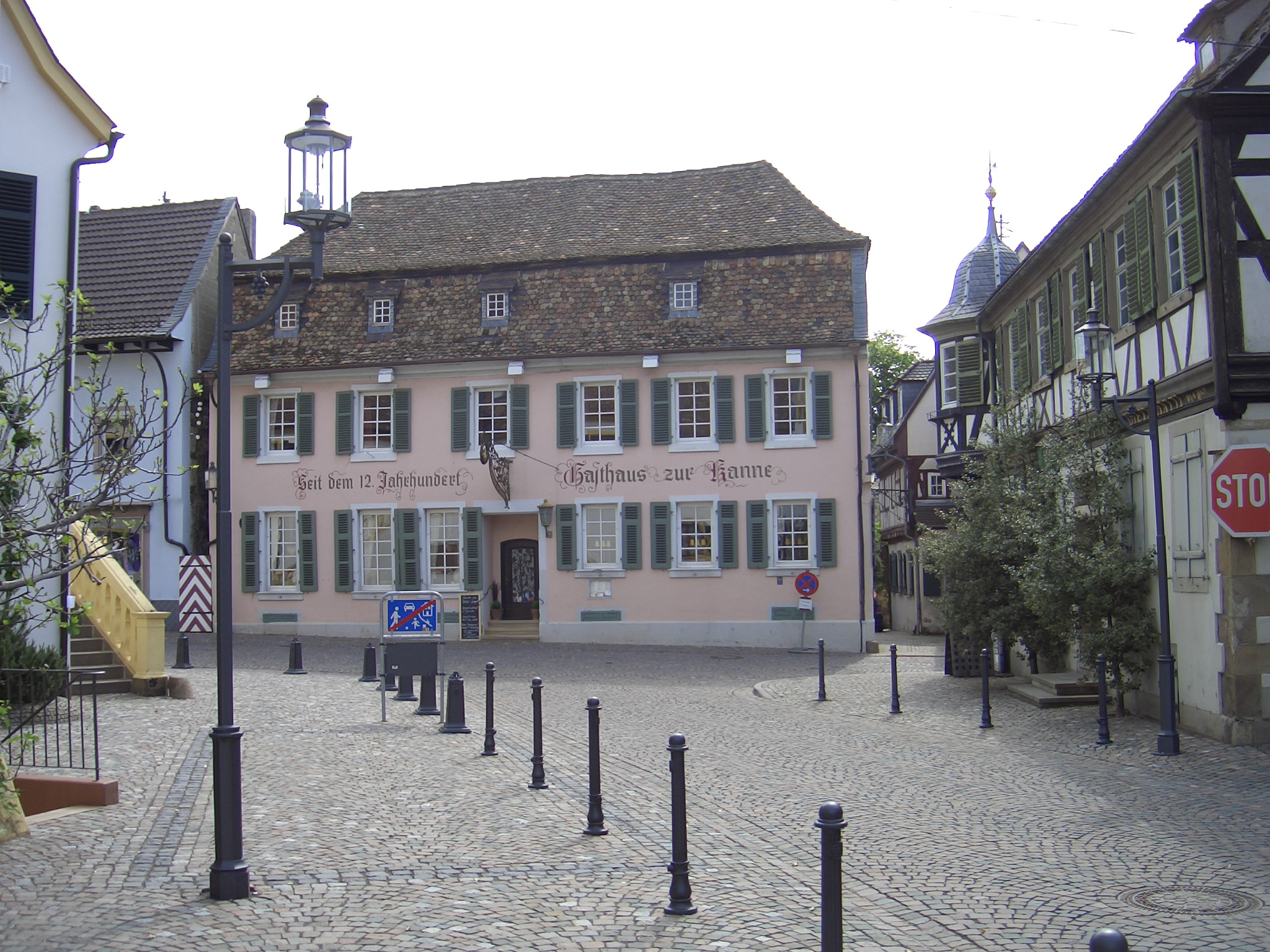
The Gasthaus zur Kanne (“Inn at the Jug”)

In Deidesheim a considerable catering and lodging industry has sprung up, which can easily be traced to the winegrowing and tourism industry. Since winegrowing and tourism profit from each other, they are, to a certain extent, dependent on each other. In Deidesheim there are many hotels and pensions whose capacity is around 800 beds. Moreover, for a town of Deidesheim's size, there are many restaurants, the best known being the Gasthaus zur Kanne (“Inn at the Jug”) and the Schwarzer Hahn (“Black Cock”) at the Deidesheimer Hof Hotel. Tourism offers many jobs in town; this development owes itself to rationalization measures in the winegrowing sector. Alongside winegrowing and its attendant festivals such as the Deidesheimer Weinkerwe and the Geißbockversteigerung described earlier on, the Palatinate Forest with its developed network of paths and many carparks for hikers is important for tourism and recreation; many hikers and nature lovers come for these on day trips to Deidesheim.

=== Authorities ===
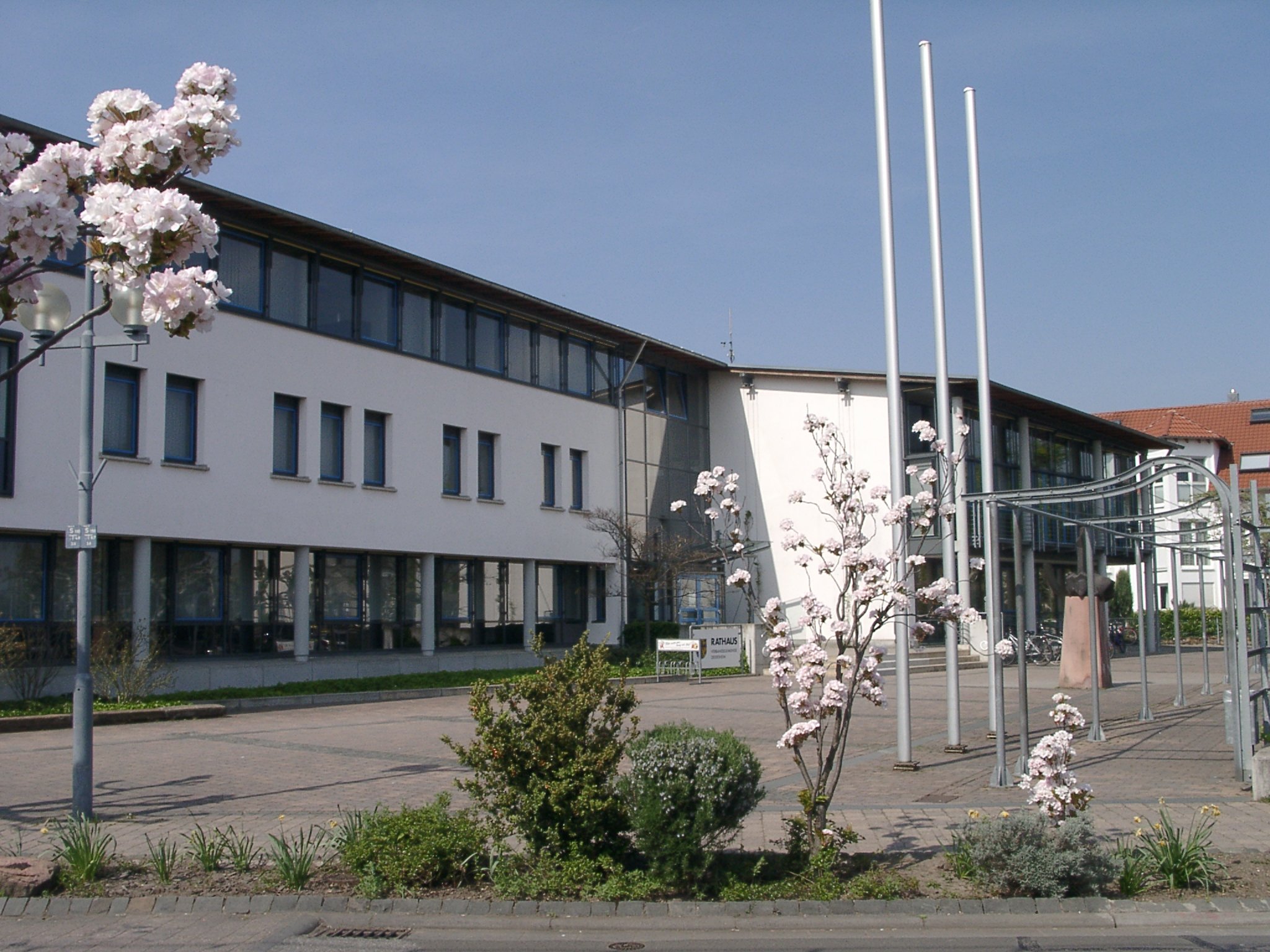
Verbandsgemeinde Hall

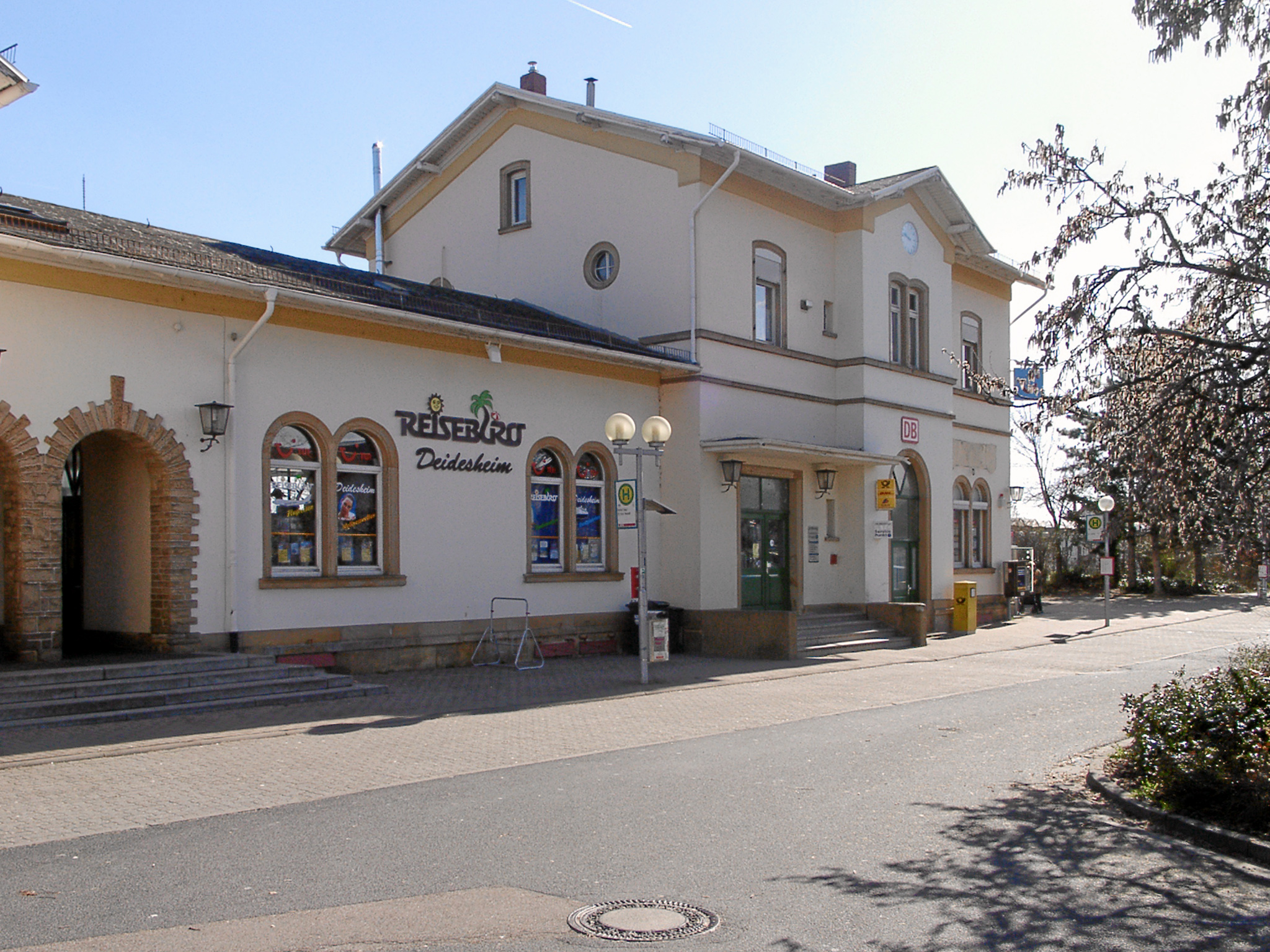
Deidesheim railway station

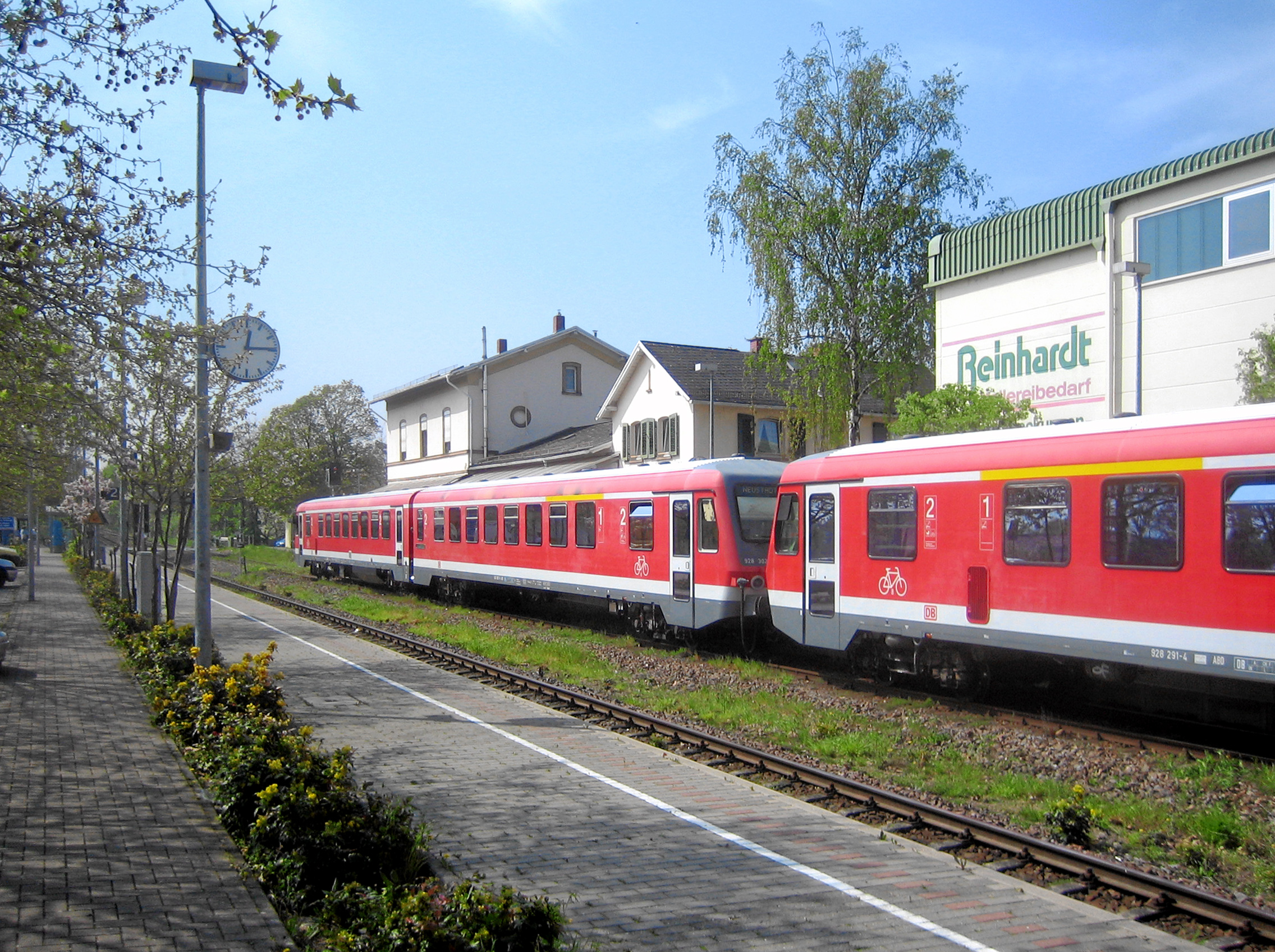
Deidesheim railway station with train

As seat of the like-named Verbandsgemeinde, the Rathaus der Verbandsgemeinde (“Verbandsgemeinde Hall”) in Deidesheim has since it took on its current duties on 1 January 1973 housed the Verbandsgemeinde administration. Here is, among other things, the Citizens’ Bureau (Bürgerbüro), a reception centre for citizens of the Verbandsgemeinde with questions and concerns having to do with the public sector, such as, for instance, issues of residency, issuing Personalausweise and passports, or issuing payroll tax cards and postal voting documents. Furthermore, there are also forms for requests of any kind and a lost-and-found.

=== Transport ===
==== Rail transport history ====
After the Palatinate’s first railway line, between Ludwigshafen and Bexbach, came into service in 1849, Dürkheim, Deidesheim and the other municipalities in the Middle Haardt, too, strove for a rail link. A local committee put forth a suggestion in 1860 to build a railway line from Neustadt to Dürkheim in Frankenthal, a request that was granted on 3 February 1862 by the administration of the Pfälzische Ludwigsbahn. One of the eight signers from the local committee was the Deidesheim landowner Ludwig Andreas Jordan. The Bavarian King Maximilian II eventually awarded the committee, represented by the eight signatories thereto, the “Supreme Concession Document for Forming a Corporation to Build and Run a Railway from Neustadt a. H. to Dürkheim”. To carry out this project, a company was formed, the Neustadt-Dürkheimer Eisenbahn-Gesellschaft, which was later absorbed by the Gesellschaft der Pfälzischen Nordbahnen.

In 1865, the Bad Dürkheim–Neustadt an der Haardt (now Neustadt an der Weinstraße) railway line was completed, whose trains also stopped at Deidesheim. On 6 May of that year, the first train made the roughly 15 km (9 mi) trip along the line. Until the late 19th century, Deidesheim grew into an important goods station. Important commodities that were handled here were dung, wood, coal and wine. Moreover, basalt, mined near the Pechsteinkopf (mountain) and transported to Deidesheim station by cableway, was loaded here. Goods transport, though, dwindled through to the 1980s until it was discontinued. Since then, there have only been passenger trains.

==== Public transport ====
Over the link afforded by the Neustadt–Bad Dürkheim line, each of those towns can be reached from the other in roughly 10 minutes by rail. The trains run half-hourly in both directions throughout the day. By changing trains at Neustadt's main station, both Mannheim and Kaiserslautern can then be reached by S-Bahn in about 30 minutes. With the introduction of “Rhineland-Palatinate timing” and the link to the RheinNeckar S-Bahn, Deidesheim is well linked to rail transport. Deidesheim is furthermore linked to the two bus routes Neustadt–Bad Dürkheim and Deidesheim–Ludwigshafen. Public transport in Deidesheim is within the area covered by the VRN tariff structures.

==== Highway transport ====
Running through Deidesheim from north to south is the German Wine Route, which used to be the same road as Bundesstraße 271. That road's new alignment has merely taken it along the town's eastern outskirts since it was opened as a bypass in 2000. The B 271 affords a quick link to the south to the Autobahn A 65 (interchange 11 Deidesheim), over which Ludwigshafen can be reached in about 25 minutes and Karlsruhe in about 50. To the north along the B 271 lies Bad Dürkheim, where there is an interchange on the A 650 (Bad Dürkheim–Ludwigshafen).

=== Media ===
For Deidesheim readers, the daily newspaper Die Rheinpfalz contains a local section called Mittelhaardter Rundschau, which is also available in Haßloch, Neustadt an der Weinstraße and the Lambrecht area as part of the same newspaper. Weekly, the advertising fliers Stadtanzeiger (in the Verbandsgemeinden of Deidesheim, Maikammer and Lambrecht, as well as in Neustadt an der Weinstraße) and Rund um die Mittlere Weinstraße (in the Verbandsgemeinden of Deidesheim and Wachenheim). Likewise weekly, the public journal of the Verbandsgemeinde of Deidesheim is delivered to every household in Deidesheim.

On the cable television network, the regional broadcaster Offener Kanal Ludwigshafen was available until 20 November 2008, but since that day, owing to cable network restructuring, subscribers now receive Offener Kanal Neustadt/Weinstraße and Rhein-Neckar Fernsehen.

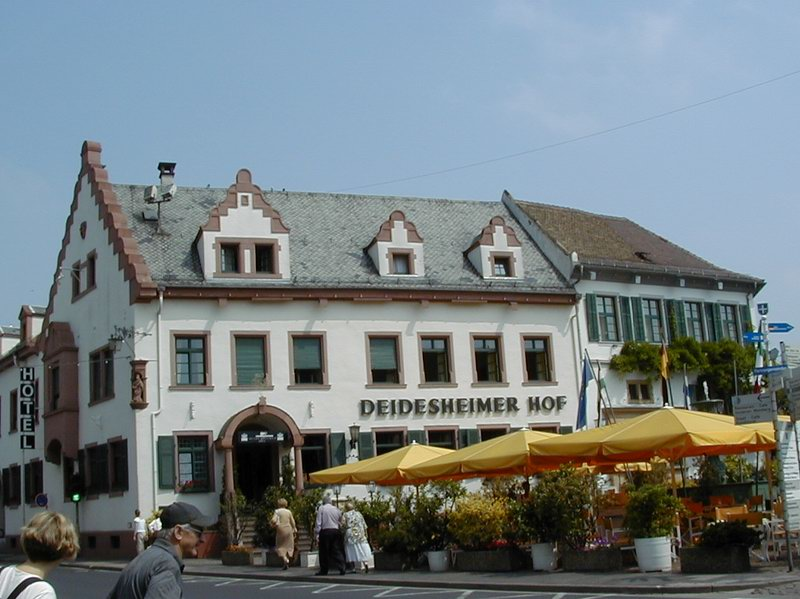
Deidesheimer Hof

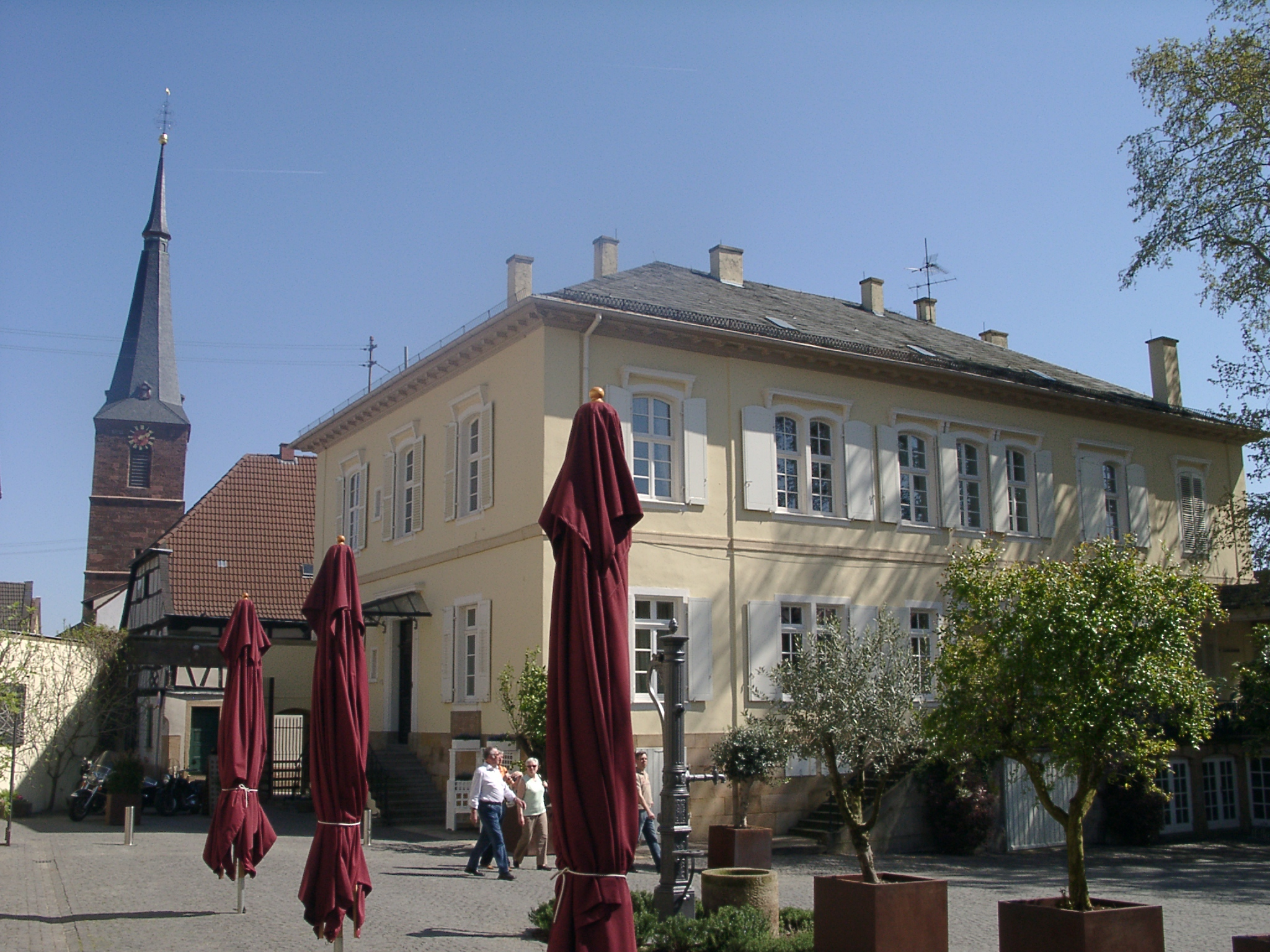
Ketschauer Hof

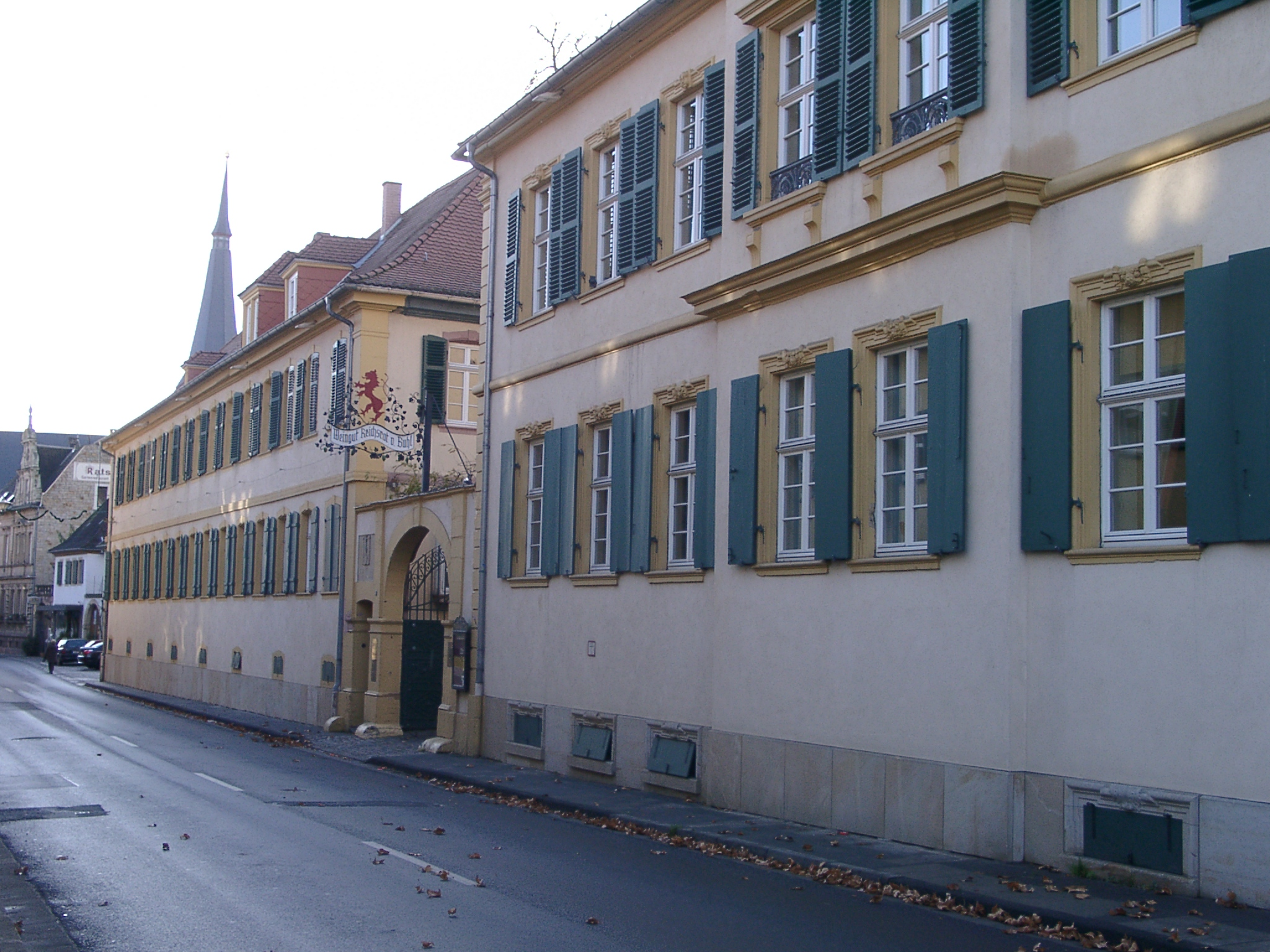
Buhlsches Gutshaus

=== Established businesses ===
==== Deidesheimer Hof ====
The hotel Deidesheimer Hof with its “Nobelrestaurant Schwarzer Hahn”, once run by leading-edge cook Manfred Schwarz, is known above all for former Federal Chancellor Helmut Kohl’s visits, on which he often brought along state guests to entertain. Margaret Thatcher, Mikhail Gorbachev and Boris Yeltsin, among others, thus all got to know the traditional Palatine dish Saumagen (“sow’s stomach”). The Deidesheimer Hof became the second five-star hotel in Rhineland-Palatinate in 2001 since the classification was introduced in 1996.

==== Reichsrat von Buhl winery ====
The winery's founder was Franz Peter Buhl (1809–1862); in 1849 it came into being through the so-called Jordansche Teilung, a division of inheritance (see Winegrowing history above). Today the winery cultivates a vineyard area of some 52 ha, mostly within Deidesheim's and Forst's limits and is a member of the VDP. In 1989 the house was leased to Japanese investors. Since 2005 it has belonged to the Niederberger Group.

==== Geheimer Rat Dr. von Bassermann-Jordan winery ====
The foundation stone for this wine estate was laid by Andreas Jordan (1775–1848), who with his ideas promoted the production and marketing of Palatine Qualitätsweine. Today the winery cultivates a vineyard area of some 42 ha, among them many locations within Deidesheim's and Forst's limits. The winery is a member of the VDP; in 2002 it was bought by the Neustadt entrepreneur Achim Niederberger and now belongs to his business group.

==== Leopold von Winning winery ====
The winery came into being through the so-called Jordansche Teilung (see Winegrowing history above); its first owner and founder was Friedrich Deinhard (1812–1871) from Koblenz whose father Johann Friedrich Deinhard had founded the Deinhard firm. The winery cultivates a vineyard area of some 40 ha within Deidesheim's, Ruppertsberg’s and Forst's limits and belongs to the VDP. Since late 2007, it has belonged to the Niederberger Group.

==== Sektkellerei Deidesheim ====
In this business, which once dealt purely with winegrowing, Klaus Reis began to build a Sekt wine cellar after the Second World War alongside the bottle wholesale business founded by his father Johannes. This Sektkellerei now works 6 ha of its own vineyards around Deidesheim and draws the greater part of the raw wines that it needs to make Sekt from wineries in the nearby area. It is a member of the Deutscher Sektverband and is under the family Reis's ownership.

==== J. Biffar & Co. GmbH ====
This company is one of Germany's last producers of candied fruit used in the manufacture of sweetmeats and pralines. It was founded in 1890 by Josef Biffar, who had dealt much with the process of candying. Linked with the company is the Josef Biffar winery, which belongs to the VDP.

== Famous people ==
=== Sons and daughters of the town ===
- Andreas Jordan (1775−1848), Mayor of Deidesheim, Member of the Bavarian Landtag and trailblazer in the introduction of Qualitätswein growing in the Palatinate
- Franz Tafel (1799−1869), Member of the Bavarian Landtag
- Ludwig Andreas Jordan (1811−1883), Mayor of Deidesheim, Member of the Bavarian Landtag and Member of the Reichstag
- Eugen Buhl (1841−1910), Member of the Bavarian Landtag
- Andreas Deinhard (1845−1907), Member of the Bavarian Landtag and Member of the Reichstag
- Heinrich Buhl (1848−1907), legal scholar
- Johann Julius Siben (1851−1907), Mayor of Deidesheim and Member of the Bavarian Landtag
- Josef Giessen (1858−1944), Member of the Bavarian Landtag
- Josef Siben (1864−1941), Member of the Bavarian Landtag
- Franz Eberhard Buhl (1867−1921), Member of the Bavarian Landtag
- Ludwig Bassermann-Jordan (1869−1914), Mayor of Deidesheim, leader in the founding of the Verband Deutscher Prädikatsweingüter
- Friedrich von Bassermann-Jordan (1872−1959), winegrowing historian and honorary citizen of Deidesheim
- Ernst von Bassermann-Jordan (1876–1932), German art and timepiece collector

=== Famous people associated with the town ===
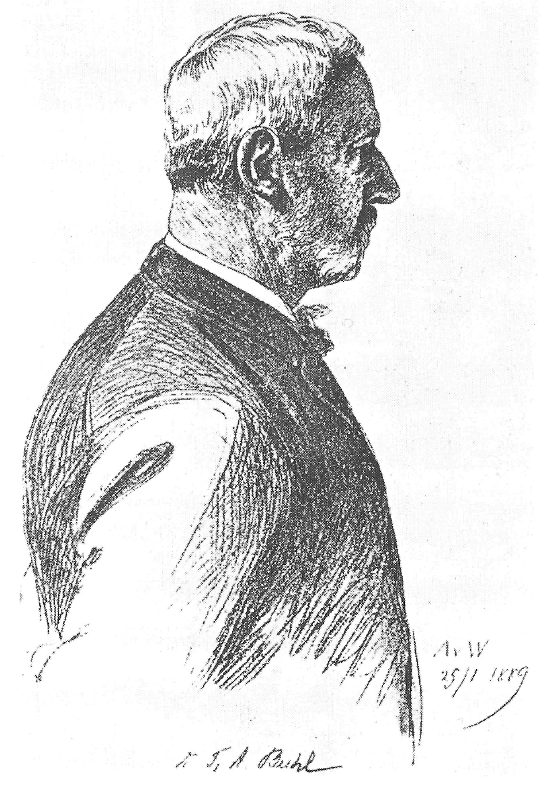
Franz Armand Buhl

- Carl Heinrich "Bipontinus" Schultz (1805−1867), botanist, initiator in the founding of Pollichia, a conservation club
- Franz Peter Buhl (1809−1862), Member of the Baden and Bavarian Landtage
- Emil Bassermann-Jordan (1835−1915), banker
- Franz Armand Buhl, (1837−1896), Member of the Bavarian Landtag, Member of the Reichstag and Vice-President of the Reichstag
- Hanns Haberer (1890−1967), Minister for Economics and Finance in Rhineland-Palatinate and honorary citizen of Deidesheim
- Theo Becker (1927−2006), oenologist and Master of the Wine Brotherhood of the Palatinate
- Stefan Steinweg (1969– ), professional cyclist, German champion, world champion and Olympic medallist
