= Palatine Wine Queen =

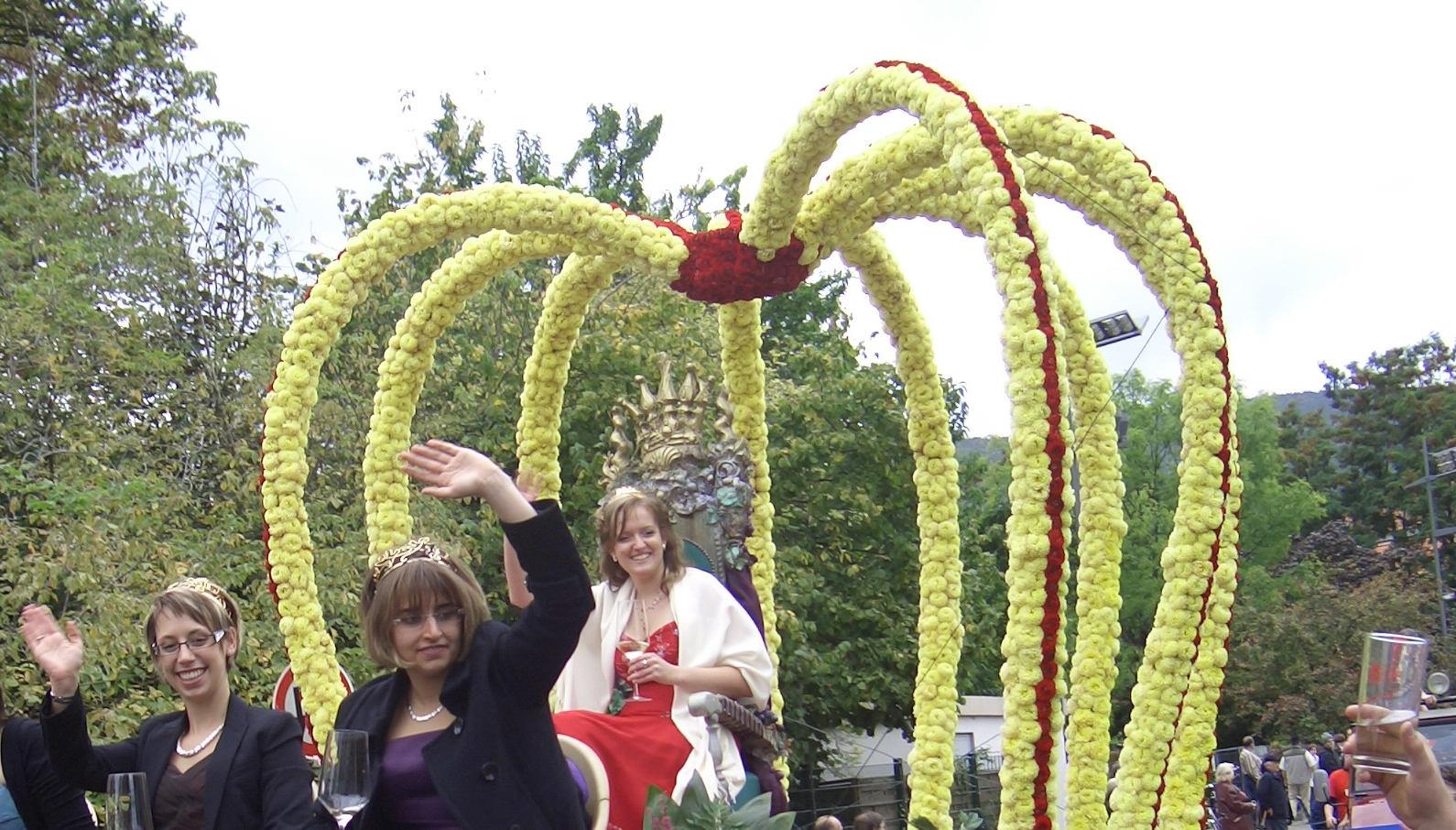
Gabi Klein, Palatine Wine Queen in 2009/10, with two of her princesses at the Neustadt Wine Festival Parade

The Palatine Wine Queen (German: Pfälzische Weinkönigin), sometimes also called the Palatinate Wine Queen, is the annually elected representative of the Palatine wine region, one of currently 13 recognized wine regions in Germany. She is eligible to participate, the following year, in the competition for the German Wine Queen.

== History ==
In 1931 the Palatinate region of Germany nominated a wine queen in the town of Neustadt an der Weinstraße at the initiative of the publisher, Daniel Meininger, becoming the first of the German wine-growing regions to do so. The first wine queen was Ruth Bachrodt of Pirmasens in the Southwest Palatinate. This part of the Palatinate has no vineyards and Bachrodt owed her election to the fact that the organizers felt she was the prettiest girl in the audience in the festival hall (the Saalbau in Neustadt) and the judges upheld their proposal. The candidate had previously been asked the question, "What does a wine queen in all circumstances?" Bachrodt had replied, "you definitely need a pair of good shoes, so you can work in the vineyard." With that she also impressed the Pirmasens shoe manufacturer, Daniel Theysohn, and they were married in 1938.

Because the Palatine Wine Queen in Germany was the only wine queen for many years, she also represented German wine as a whole until 1939 and then again from 1947 to 1949 without needing to go through any further competition. In 1949, too, there was only one competition, but subsequently Elisabeth Kuhn, later Gies from Diedesfeld officially became the German Wine Queen and was thus the only person to hold the titles of Palatine Wine Queen and German Wine Queen in the same year.

== Competition process ==
The election of the Palatine Wine Queen traditionally takes place during the German Wine Festival, in the Saalbau in the town of Neustadt an der Weinstraße, on the Friday of the first weekend of the festival at the end of September or early October. After her year in office the Palatine Wine Queen, together with the wine queens of the other twelve German wine regions, takes part in the competition to choose the German Wine Queen. In two years, the outgoing Palatine Wine Queen has been chosen as the German Wine Queen: Sylvia Benzinger in 2005 and Katja Schweder in 2006.

== List of Palatine wine queens ==
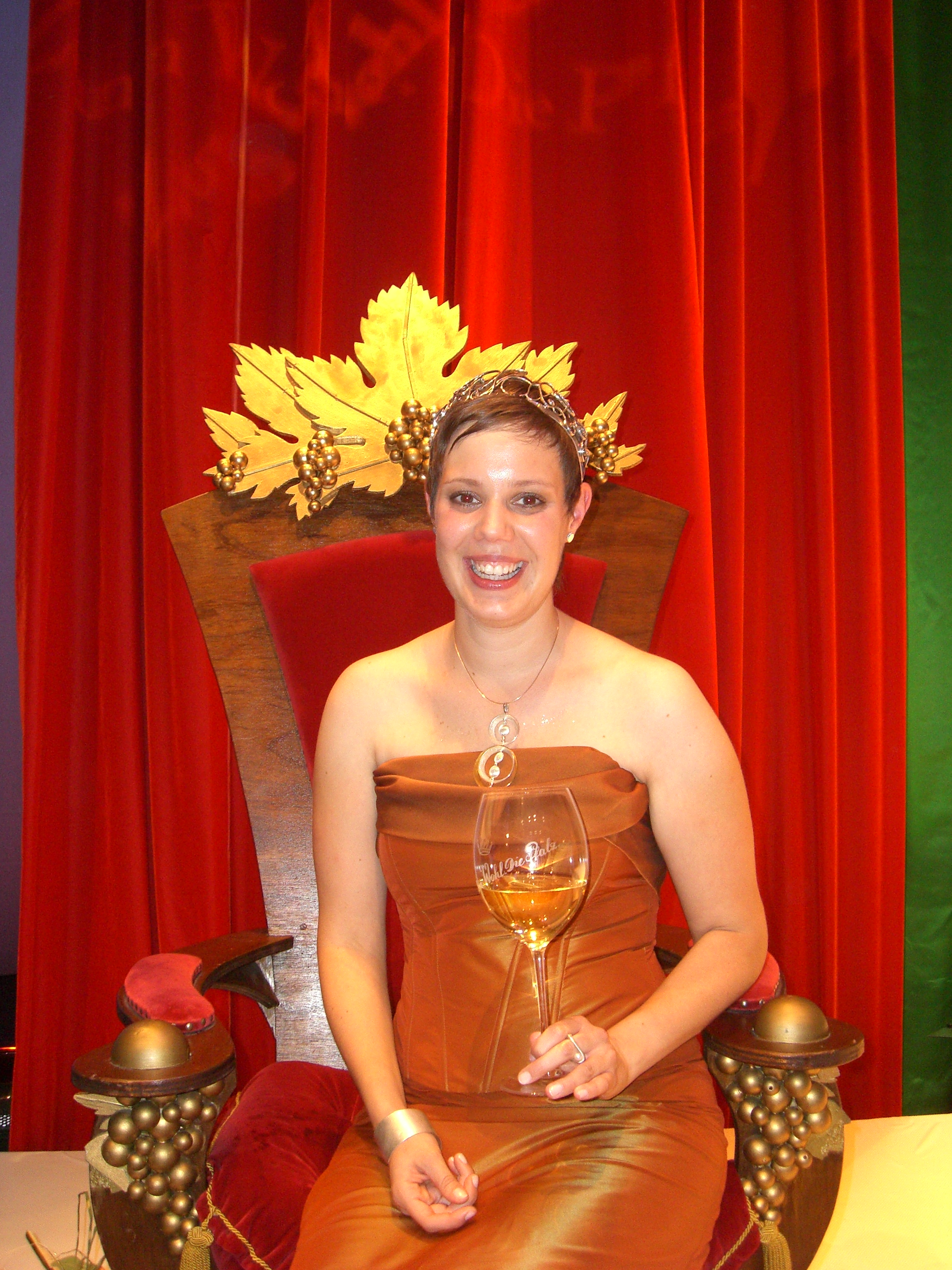
Julia Becker, Palatine Wine Queen in 2007/08

The following list shows all Palatine Wine Queens since the competition began in 1931:

1. 1931/32: Ruth Bachrodt, later Theysohn (born 9 Mar 1913; died 5 Mar 1997), Pirmasens
2. 1932/33: Cilly Seitz, Rhodt
3. 1933/34: Gertrud Dörr, Wachenheim
4. 1934/35: Trudel Knauber, Billigheim
5. 1935/36: Hilde Köhler, Gimmeldingen
6. 1936/37: Elisabeth Fitz, later Keller, Edenkoben
7. 1937/38: Gustel Hauptmann, Haardt
8. 1938/39: Maria Poh, Hambach
9. 1947/48: Ilse Kurz, Mußbach
10. 1948/49: Cäcilia Hormuth, St. Martin
11. 1949/50: Elisabeth Kuhn, later Gies, Diedesfeld
12. 1950/51: Trudel Keller, Bad Dürkheim
13. 1951/52: Marlies Lack, Bad Dürkheim
14. 1952/53: Anneliese Bender, Gleisweiler
15. 1953/54: Ingrid Schreck, later Seyler, Deidesheim
16. 1954/55: Rosemarie Reibold, Freinsheim
17. 1955/56: Annemarie Müller, Haardt
18. 1956/57: Ilse Reinig, later Rodach, Edesheim
19. 1957/58: Doris Christmann, St. Martin
20. 1958/59: Renate Poh, Hambach
21. 1959/60: Christel Koch, Ungstein
22. 1960/61: Bärbel Christa Härle, Mußbach
23. 1961/62: Sieglinde Jung, Siebeldingen
24. 1962/63: Inge Bender, Kallstadt
25. 1963/64: Waltraud Lohr, Obrigheim
26. 1964/65: Waltraud Hey, Oberotterbach
27. 1965/66: Heidi Eberle, Laumersheim
28. 1966/67: Ulrike Klein, Rhodt
29. 1967/68: Christa Jung, Siebeldingen
30. 1968/69: Heidrun Reim, Mußbach
31. 1969/70: Gretel Stachel, Maikammer
32. 1970/71: Ruth Kröther, Freinsheim
33. 1971/72: Melitta Engel (born 24 Mar 1952; died 8 Sep 2012), Obrigheim
34. 1972/73: Helga Weber, Weisenheim am Sand
35. 1973/74: Siegrid Betz, Wachenheim
36. 1974/75: Annette Oehl, later Göb, Forst
37. 1975/76: Maritta Müller, Hambach
38. 1976/77: Ingrid Grimm, Schweigen
39. 1977/78: Heidrun Winkelmann, Gimmeldingen
40. 1978/79: Christa Brauch, Birkweiler
41. 1979/80: Heike Bohnenstiel, later Voss, Herxheim am Berg
42. 1980/81: Hildegard Weber, Gönnheim
43. 1981/82: Gaby Brückmann, Freinsheim
44. 1982/83: Claudia Hänling, Heuchelheim
45. 1983/84: Sigrun Stutzmann, Einselthum
46. 1984/85: Heidrun Wolf, Birkweiler
47. 1985/86: Maria Bergold, Wachenheim
48. 1986/87: Ulrike Peter, Bad Dürkheim
49. 1987/88: Annette Borell, later Borell-Diehl, Hainfeld
50. 1988/89: Anne Brauner, later Fischer, Göcklingen
51. 1989/90: Birgit Schehl, later Rebholz-Schehl (born 1969), Hainfeld
52. 1990/91: Diane Blaul, later Fehling (born 25. Juli 1973), Gönnheim
53. 1991/92: Birgit Weisbrod, later Lorenz, Freinsheim
54. 1992/93: Christine Schneider (born 5 Jun 1972), Edenkoben
55. 1993/94: Claudia Heupel, later Hoffmann, Nußdorf
56. 1994/95: Silke Gerner, later Wolz (born 1972), Weisenheim am Sand
57. 1995/96: Monika Metz, Pleisweiler
58. 1996/97: Sonja Freund, later Freund-Kuhmann, Bad Dürkheim
59. 1997/98: Jasmin Müller, Landau
60. 1998/99: Eva Wendel (born 1 Aug 1975), Bissersheim
61. 1999/2000: Birgit Winkler, Steinweiler
62. 2000/01: Anke Schmitt, Bad Dürkheim
63. 2001/02: Tanja Schmidt, Deidesheim
64. 2002/03: Barbara Klein (born 28 Dec 1981), Hainfeld
65. 2003/04: Tina Kiefer (born 26 Feb 1981), Ranschbach
66. 2004/05: Sylvia Benzinger, later Benzinger-Kugler (born 16 Aug 1978), Kirchheim
67. 2005/06: Katja Schweder (born 15 Jun 1980), Hochstadt
68. 2006/07: Susanne Winterling (born 1 Dec 1986), Niederkirchen
69. 2007/08: Julia Becker (born 28 Sep 1982), Edesheim
70. 2008/09: Patricia Frank (born 1 Oct 1985), Bockenheim
71. 2009/10: Gabi Klein (born 8 Mar 1987), Diedesfeld
72. 2010/11: Karen Storck (born 23 Feb 1988), Einselthum
73. 2011/12: Anna Katharina Hochdörffer (born 27 Sep 1988), Nußdorf
74. 2012/13: Andrea Römmich (born 30 Nov 1988), Edenkoben
75. 2013/14: Janina Huhn (* 25 October 1989), Bad Dürkheim
76. 2014/15: Laura Julier (* 16 April 1991), Hambach
77. 2015/16: Julia Kren, Meckenheim
78. 2016/17: Anastasia Kronauer (* 2 May 1992), Lachen-Speyerdorf
79. 2017/18: Inga Storck (* 21 July 1994), Einselthum
80. 2018/19: Meike Klohr (* 1994), Mußbach
81. 2019/20: Anna-Maria Löffler, Haßloch

== German Wine Queens from the Palatinate ==
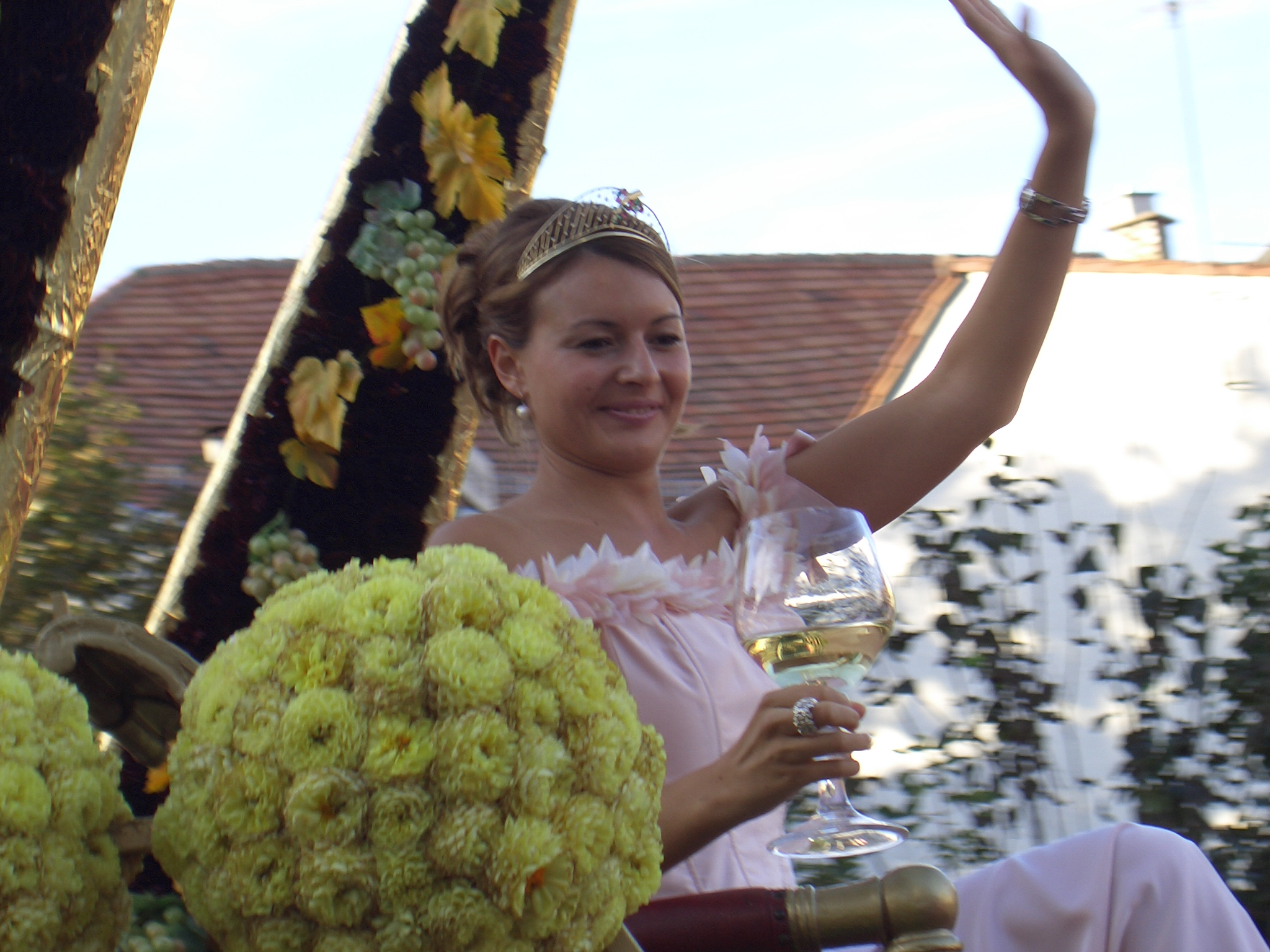
Katja Schweder als German Wine Queen

To date the following representatives from the Palatine wine region have been crowned as German Wine Queen:

1. 1949/50: Elisabeth Kuhn, later Gies
2. 1955/56: Irmgard Mohler (did not previously hold the title of Palatine Wine Queen)
3. 1960/61: Christel Koch
4. 1965/66: Waltraud Hey
5. 1971/72: Ruth Kröther
6. 1981/82: Hildegard Weber
7. 1990/91: Birgit Schehl
8. 2005/06: Sylvia Benzinger
9. 2006/07: Katja Schweder
