= Forst an der Weinstraße =

- Municipality
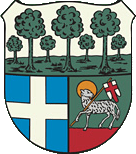
- Coat of arms

- Location of Forst an der Weinstraße within Bad Dürkheim district
- Interactive map of Forst an der Weinstraße
- Location within Germany Location within Rhineland-Palatinate
- Coordinates: 49°25′26″N 8°11′23″E
- Country: Germany
- State: Rhineland-Palatinate
- District: Bad Dürkheim
- Municipal assoc.: Deidesheim

Government
  - Mayor (2019–24): Bernhard Klein (CDU)

Area
  - Total: 3.59 km^{2} (1.39 sq mi)
- Elevation: 110 m (360 ft)

Population (2025-12-31)
  - Total: 789
  - Density: 220/km^{2} (569/sq mi)
- Time zone: UTC+01:00 (CET)
  - Summer (DST): UTC+02:00 (CEST)
- Postal codes: 67147
- Dialling codes: 06326
- Vehicle registration: DÜW
- Website: www.forst-weinstrasse.de

Forst an der Weinstraße (or Forst an der Weinstrasse) is an Ortsgemeinde – a municipality belonging to a Verbandsgemeinde, a kind of collective municipality – in the Bad Dürkheim district in Rhineland-Palatinate, Germany.

== Geography ==
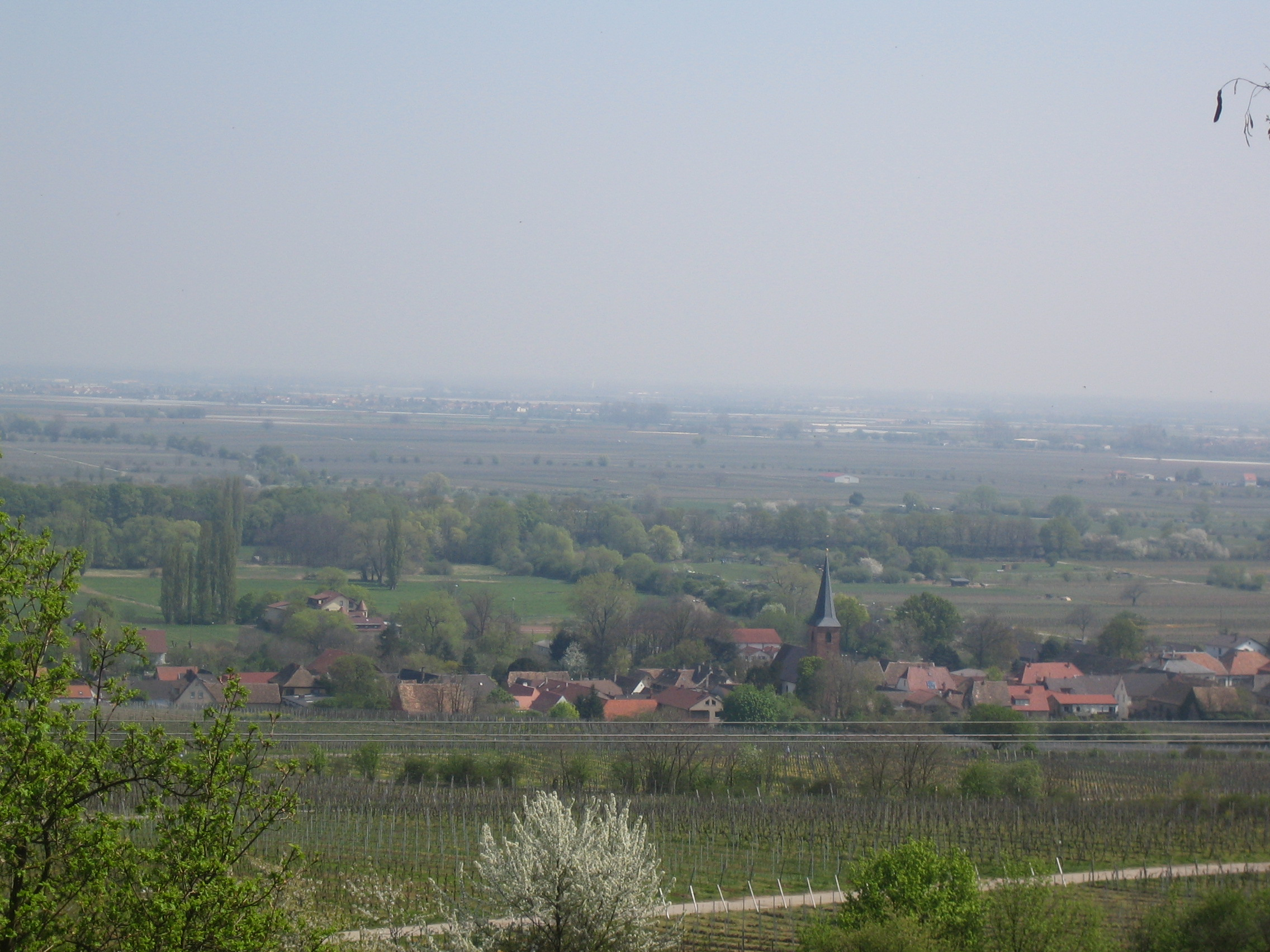
A view of Forst from across the vineyards to the west of the village

=== Location ===
The municipality lies at the hilly western edge of the Upper Rhine Plain in the Eastern Palatinate (Vorderpfalz). As its name suggests, it is also on the German Wine Route (Deutsche Weinstraße) in the Palatinate wine region. It belongs to the Verbandsgemeinde of Deidesheim, whose seat is in the like-named town.

=== Neighbouring municipalities ===
Forst an der Weinstraße borders in the north on Wachenheim, in the northeast on Friedelsheim, in the southeast on Niederkirchen and in the south on Deidesheim.

== History ==
The Salian Count Johann, Emperor Heinrich IV's nephew and from 1090 to 1104, as Johann I, Prince-Bishop of Speyer, gave his personal holdings in the Speyergau in 1100, among which was Deidesheim, as a donation to the Bishopric of Speyer. The vast woodlands north of Deidesheim, also known as Vorst or Forst (cognate with English forest and meaning the same) was excluded from this arrangement and was reserved as the Prince-Bishop's hunting ground. In this forest lie the village's beginnings, and of course its namesake. On 10 May 1525, during the German Peasants' War, Louis V, Elector Palatine led negotiations with the insurgent peasants of the Geilweiler Haufen and the Bockenheimer Haufen. When the French Revolution spread to the German lands on the Rhine’s left bank, Forst, too, temporarily became part of France’s territory. In 1816, what had once been Electoral Palatinate territory on the left bank was named the Rheinkreis, and later Rheinpfalz, and annexed to the Kingdom of Bavaria; the Palatinate remained Bavarian until the end of the Second World War.

== Politics ==
=== Municipal council ===
The council is made up of 12 council members, who were elected by majority vote at the municipal election held on 7 June 2009, and the honorary mayor as chairman.

=== Coat of arms ===
The German blazon reads: Geteilt und unten gespalten, oben auf grünem Boden in Silber sieben grüne Bäume unterschiedlicher Länge, unten rechts in Blau ein durchgehendes silbernes Kreuz, unten links in Grün mit rotem Boden ein silbernes Gotteslamm mit goldenem Nimbus und Kreuzesfahne.

The municipality’s arms might in English heraldic language be described thus: Per fess argent on a ground vert seven trees in fess, the second, fourth and sixth taller than the others of the same, and per pale azure a cross of the first and vert on a mount gules and Agnus Dei tripping reguardant with a nimbus Or and bearing on a pole of the same a standard of the first charged with a cross of the fourth.

The arms were approved by the Bavarian Ministry of the Interior in 1902 and date from a 1725 seal. The silver cross on the blue field recalls the village’s former allegiance to the Bishopric of Speyer. The trees are a canting charge for the municipality’s name, Forst, which is also a German word for “forest”. The oldest seal mentioned above had a fourth charge, a hunter, but this does not appear in the modern arms. The arms have been borne since 20 March 1902.

== Culture and sightseeing ==
=== Within the village ===
- Nördliches Ungeheuer (“Northern Monster”), a stone sculpture at the village's northern entrance by master sculptor Janet Weisbrodt, Niederkirchen bei Deidesheim
- Kirche St. Margareta (Saint Margaret's Church), a Catholic church built in 1716–1723, with a 40 m-tall tower from 1767
- Kriegerdenkmal (War Memorial), built in 1933 on the church hill as an open crypt with a three-part vaulted ceiling
- Eichbrunnen (fountain)
- Pechsteinbrunnen (fountain)
- Hansel-Fingerhut-Brunnen (fountain)
- Südliches Ungeheuer (“Southern Monster”), a stone sculpture at the village's southern entrance by master sculptor Bettina Morio, Deidesheim
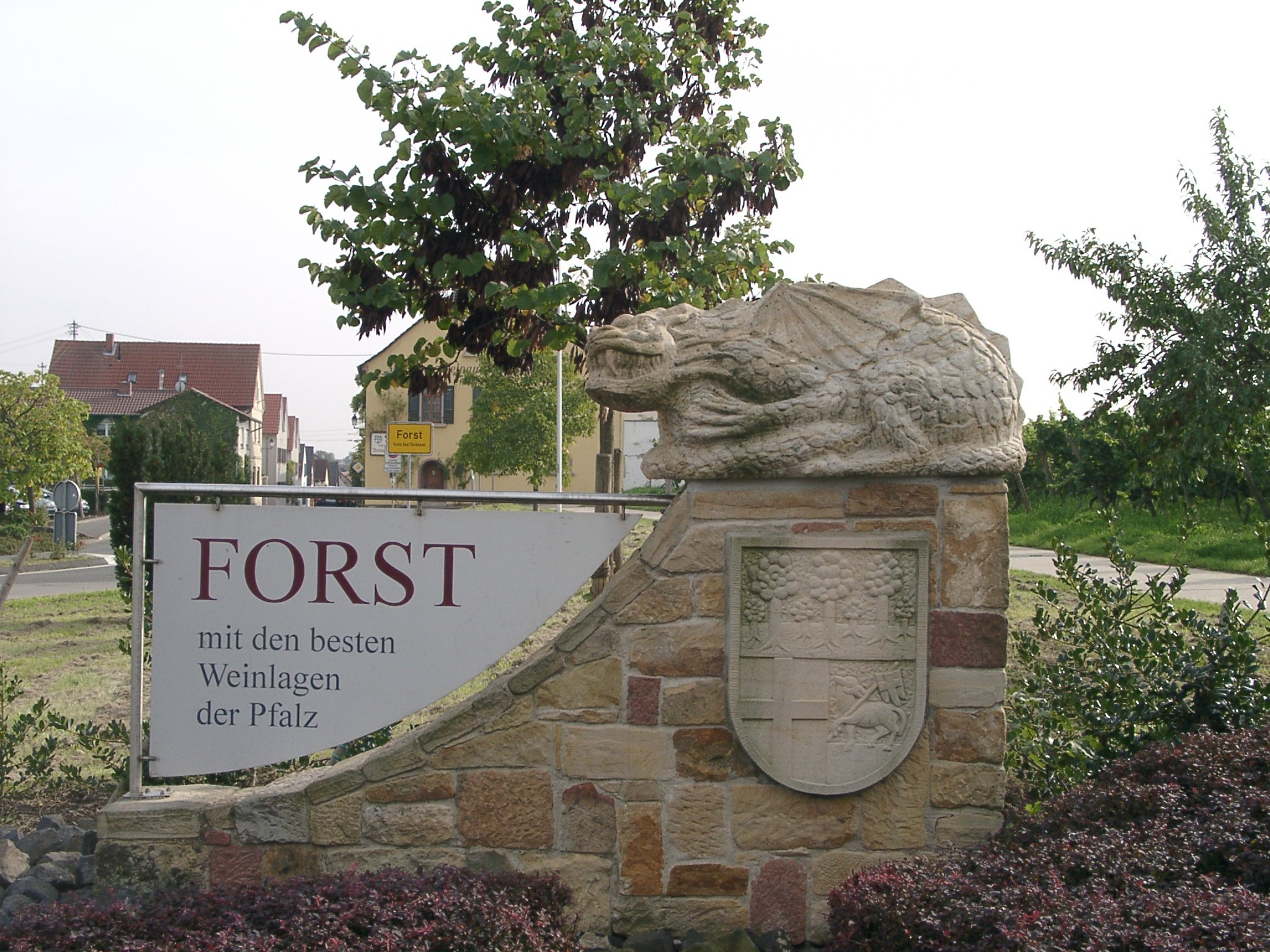
Nördliches Ungeheuer

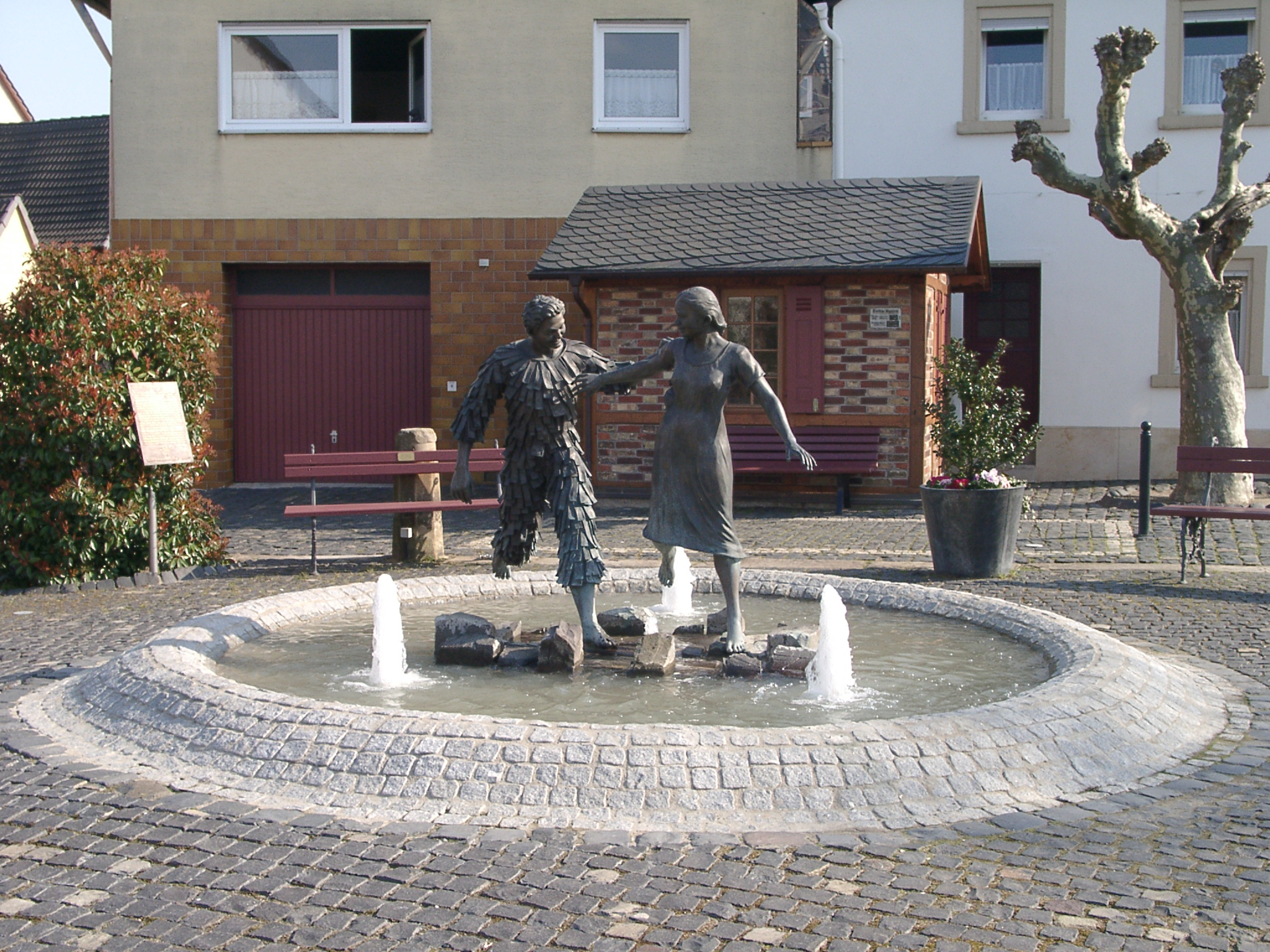
Hansel-Fingerhut-Brunnen

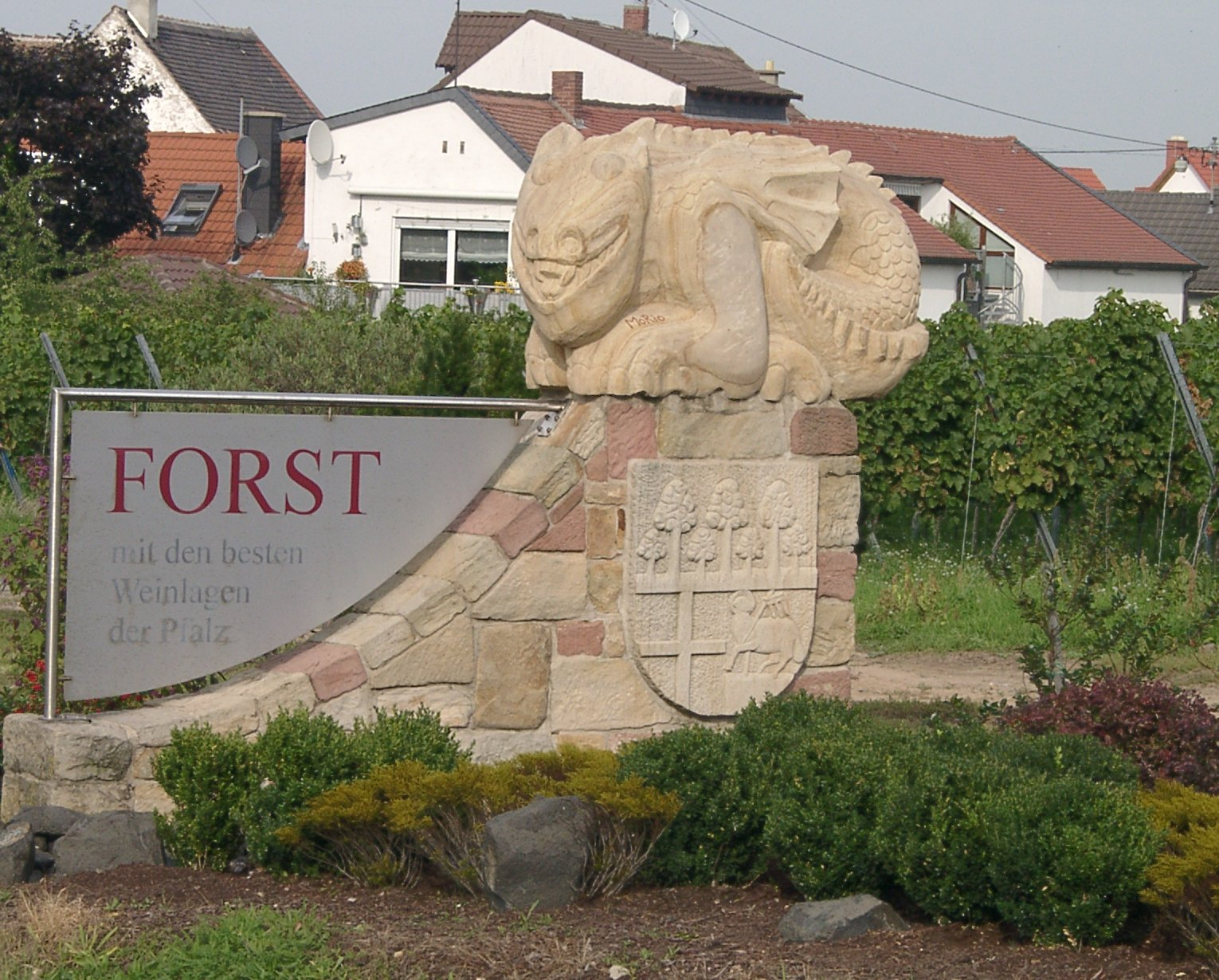
Südliches Ungeheuer

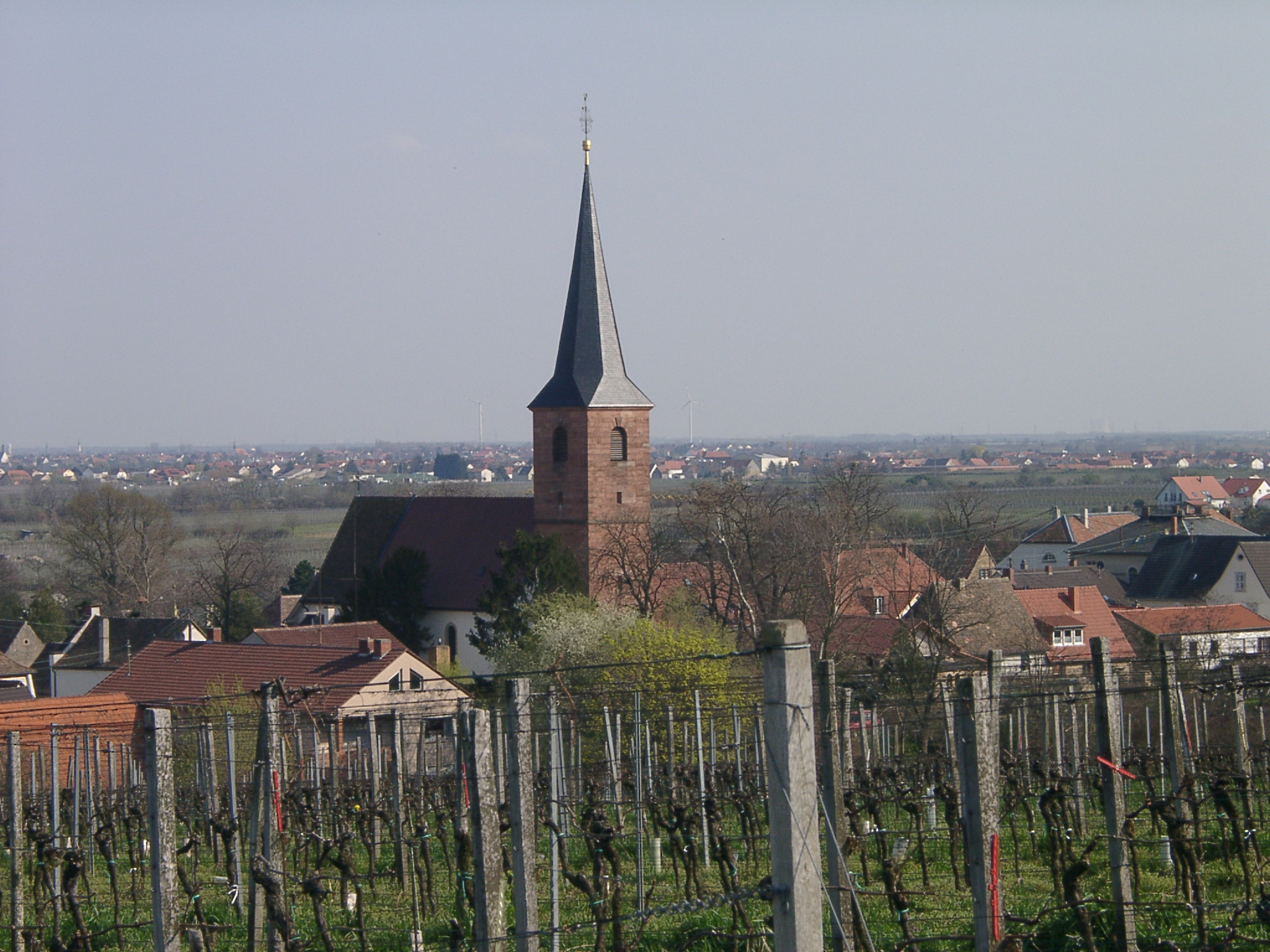
Parish church

=== Outside the village ===
- Lagenstein (roughly “Winery Stone”) with Forst's wineries engraved into it (a lookout point west of the village)
- Madonnen-Statue at the Mariengarten winery (a lookout point west of the village)
- Hahnenböhler Kreuz at the Hahnenböhl winery put up as a summit cross in 1803 and replaced with an iron version in 1886 (a lookout point west of the village)
- Bismarckhöhle (grotto) created in 1885 west of the village near the forest's edge in honour of Imperial Chancellor Otto von Bismarck’s 70th birthday. The plaque at the entrance bears an inscription whose initials, read from top down, spell out the Chancellor’s name:

Bringt Wetter dich
In Not,
So kehre bei mir ein.
Männiglich
Arm wie
Reich,
Christ oder Heid,
Künftig soll geschützet sein.
(Translation: “If weather brings you into need, then come into me. Everyone, poor as well as rich, Christian or heathen, shall henceforth be protected.”)

- Pechsteinkopf, west of Forst, with basalt deposits that were worked into the 20th century, and moved into the dale by cableway.

=== Festivals ===
- Hansel-Fingerhut-Fest with Winterverbrennung, or “Winter Burning” in which “winter” is burnt in effigy (since 1722, on Laetare Sunday)
- Weinkerwe beim Ungeheuer (“Wine Fair at the Monster’s”, on the first weekend in August)
- Erlebnistag Deutsche Weinstraße (“German Wine Route Adventure Day”, on the last Sunday in August)

== Economy and infrastructure ==
=== Economy ===
The fecundity of the soils and the mild climate made the Romans choose to plant almonds, figs and citrus fruits here, but also especially to introduce winegrowing. Forst lies in the Mittelhaardt-Deutsche Weinstraße Region and is famous for its wineries, above all for Forster Ungeheuer, Forster Kirchenstück and Pechstein. The predominant grape variety is Riesling with a share of some 85% of the roughly 180 ha of vineyard area. The municipality's livelihood is also based increasingly on tourism, which itself is bound with winegrowing and gastronomy.

=== Transport ===
Forst is a “street village” – by some definitions, a “thorpe” – meaning that, originally at least, there was only one road leading through the village, in Forst's case from north to south. Nowadays, a 1.2 km stretch of this road is part of the German Wine Route. In the beginning, this was also Bundesstraße 271 linking Bad Dürkheim and Neustadt an der Weinstraße.

An early, small bypass road was built about 1970 right at the village's eastern outskirts; it has since been “assumed” by the municipality. In the 1990s, the B 271 throughout the whole region was shifted a kilometre to the east and no longer reaches the wine centres. Over the B 271 and its Deidesheim interchange, however, there has also been since then a quick link between Forst and the Autobahn A 65 (interchange 11 Deidesheim), over which Ludwigshafen can be reached in about 25 minutes and Karlsruhe in about 50. Towards the north, the B 271 leads to Bad Dürkheim and the interchange on the A 650 (Bad Dürkheim–Ludwigshafen) found there.

=== Religion ===
In 2007, 52.4% of the inhabitants were Catholic and 29.6% Evangelical. The rest practised other faiths or none.

== Famous people ==
=== Sons and daughters of the town ===
- Wilhelm Spindler (1861–1927), chairman of the Palatine Centre Party, Member of the Landtag and the Reichstag, was born in Forst and there ran a winery.
- Peter Lewandowski (1957– ), journalist.

=== Famous people associated with the municipality ===
- Annette Oehl, later Göb (1954– ), Palatine Wine Queen in 1974/75, grew up in Forst.

New in 2024! Manuel Reuther, the first male (sovereignty of the Palatinate) wine queen, reigns with the Palatinate Wine Queen 2024/25 and a wine princess. Historic event in history for the election of the traditionally held wine queen election in Neustadt on the German Wine Route.

- Paul Tremmel (1929– ), Palatine dialectal poet, lives in Forst.
- Wilhelm Spindler (1893−?), politician (Bavarian People's Party), ran a winery in Forst.
