= Sixtyfive Cadillac =

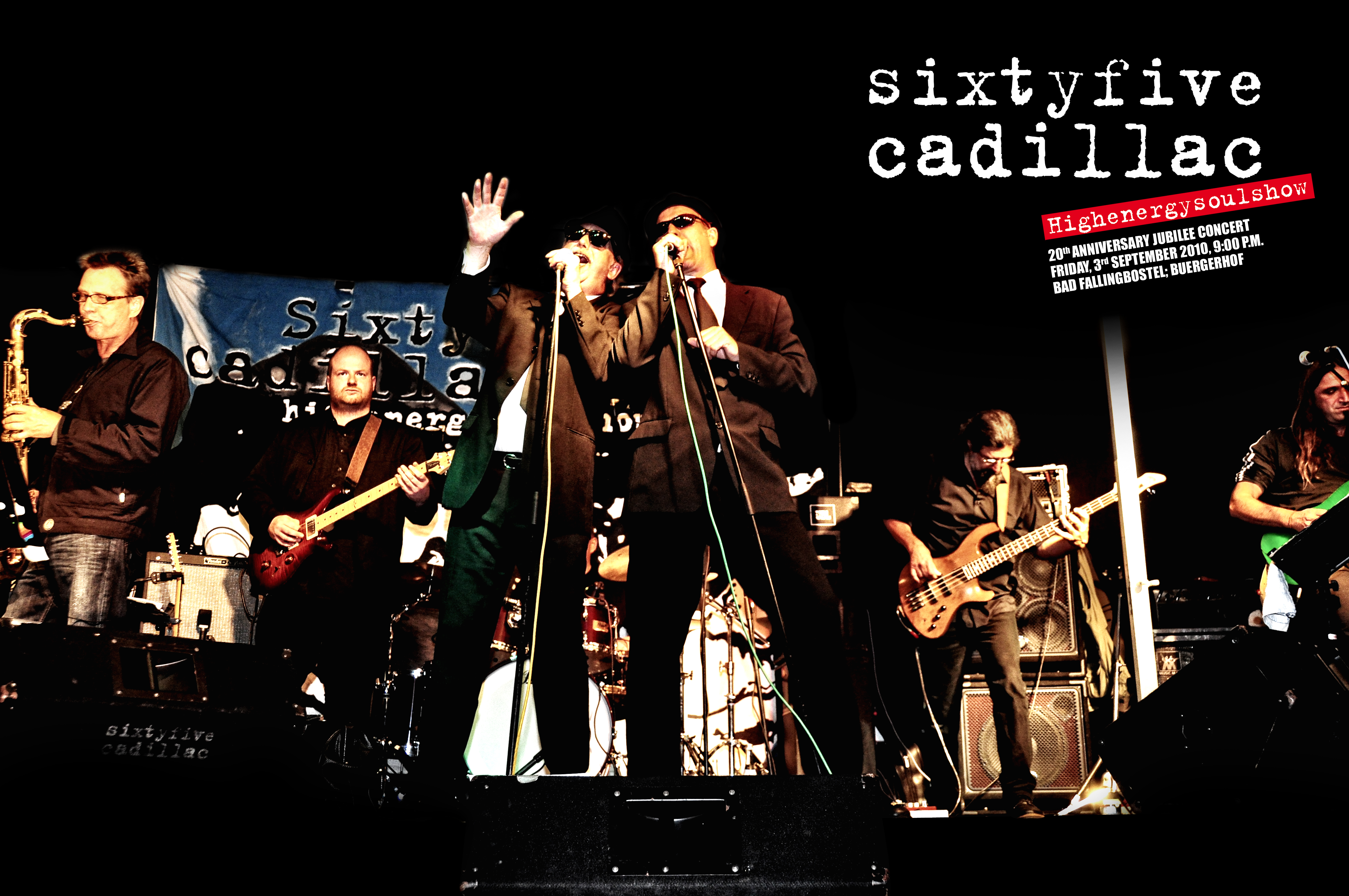
- Sixtyfive Cadillac — Highenergysoulshow celebrating their 20th anniversary in 2010

Background information
- Origin: Bad Fallingbostel, Germany
- Genres: R&B, blues, rock
- Years active: 1990–present
- Labels: Like It Is Records
- Website: www.sixtyfive-cadillac.de

Sixtyfive Cadillac — High Energy Soul Show (or 65 Cadillac) is a ten-piece rhythm 'n' blues big band from Walsrode (Lower Saxony, Germany).

Official logo

== History ==
Sixtyfive Cadillac was founded in 1990. After preliminary rehearsals in June the group played their first concert on August 25, 1990, for over five hundred fans in the legendary “Welcome” club in Hützel north of Soltau, Germany.

More than six hundred concerts in Germany, Luxembourg, and Poland have followed, as well as numerous radio and TV appearances till now.

== Members ==
- Heiko Ebeling, Walsrode (Germany), vocals and harp
- Malte Kadel, Walsrode (Germany), vocals
- Shan Gao, Shenyang, China, alto sax and flute
- Dirk Riedstra, Hilversum (Netherlands), tenor sax
- Georg Weisbrodt, Ruppertsberg (Germany), trombone
- Tom Schmeichel, Schwedt/Oder (Germany), trompet
- Andreas Petalas, Drama (Greece), guitar and vocals
- Rolf Mäusbacher, Cologne (Germany), guitar and vocals
- Damian Galinski, Tczew, Poland, keyboards
- Lukasz Pamin, Hanover (Germany), drums
- Walter Kohn, Walsrode (Germany), bass

== Discography ==
=== Studio albums ===
- Sixtyfive Cadillac, (Like It Is Records, LII 098001) (1998)
- 2, (Like It Is Records, LII 002001) (2002)
- Five Songs, (Like It Is Records, LII 012001) (2012)

=== Sampler CDs ===
- 10 Jahre Blues-Matinee Garbsen (1 Track), 2009

== Gallery ==
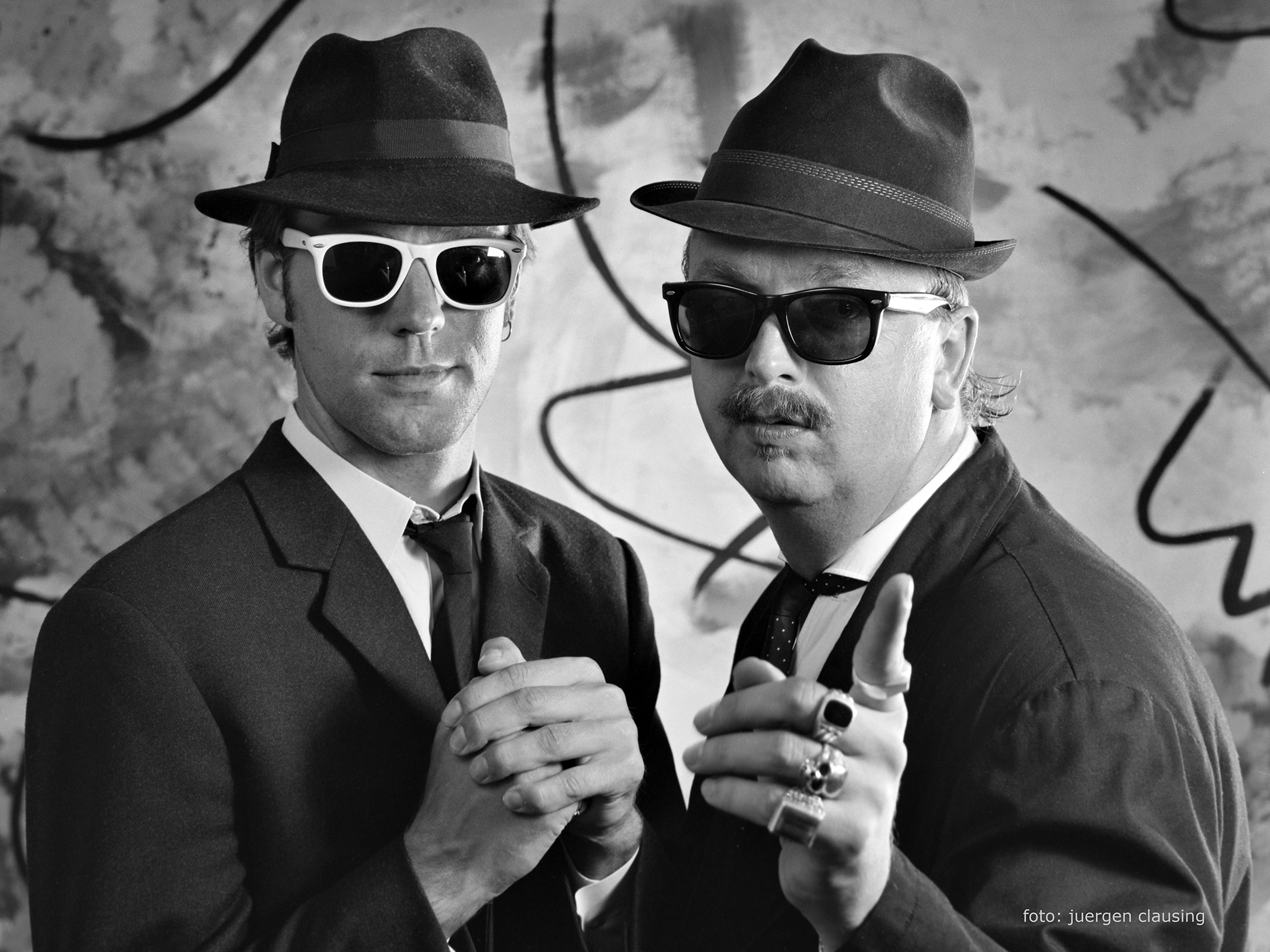
1990

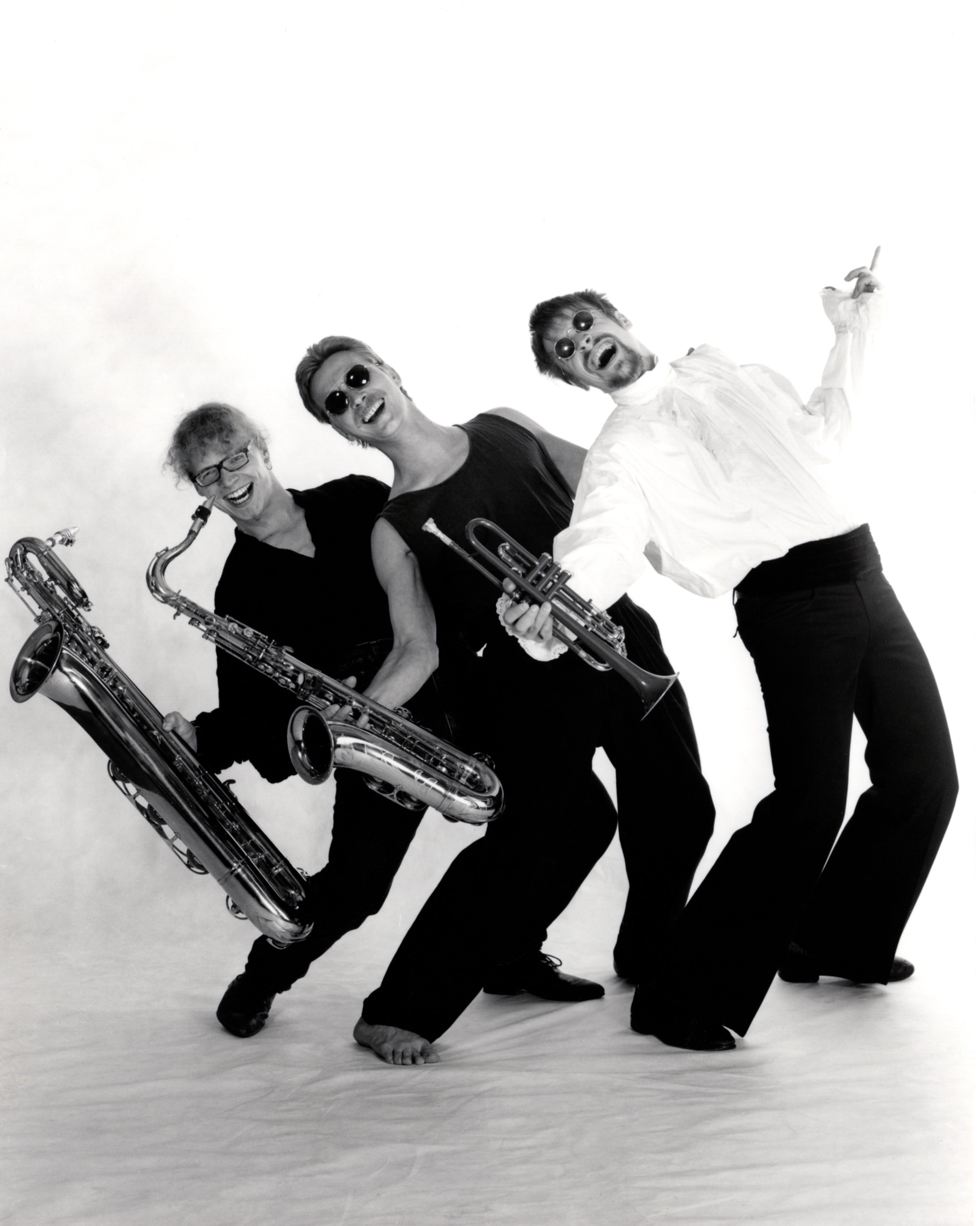
1994

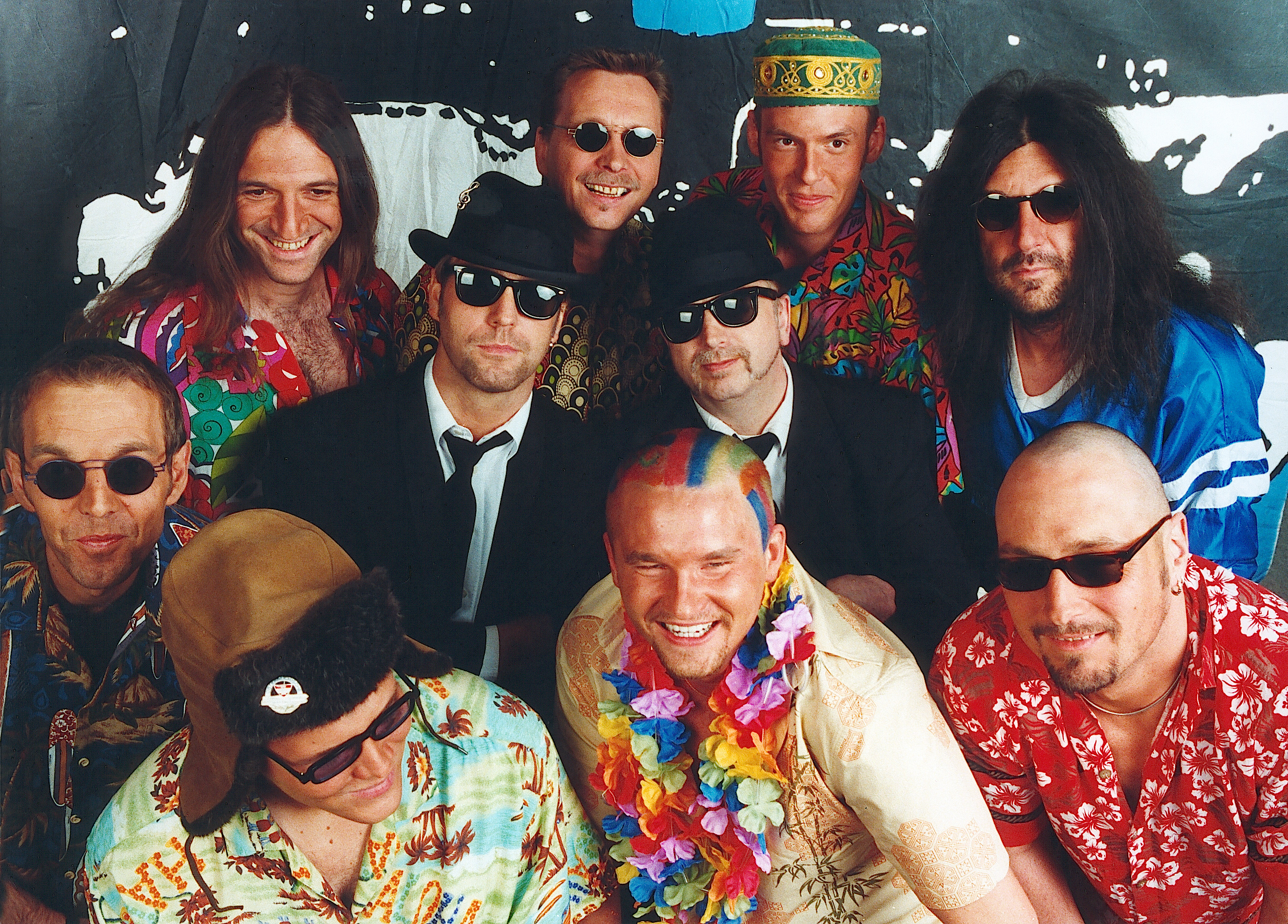
2001

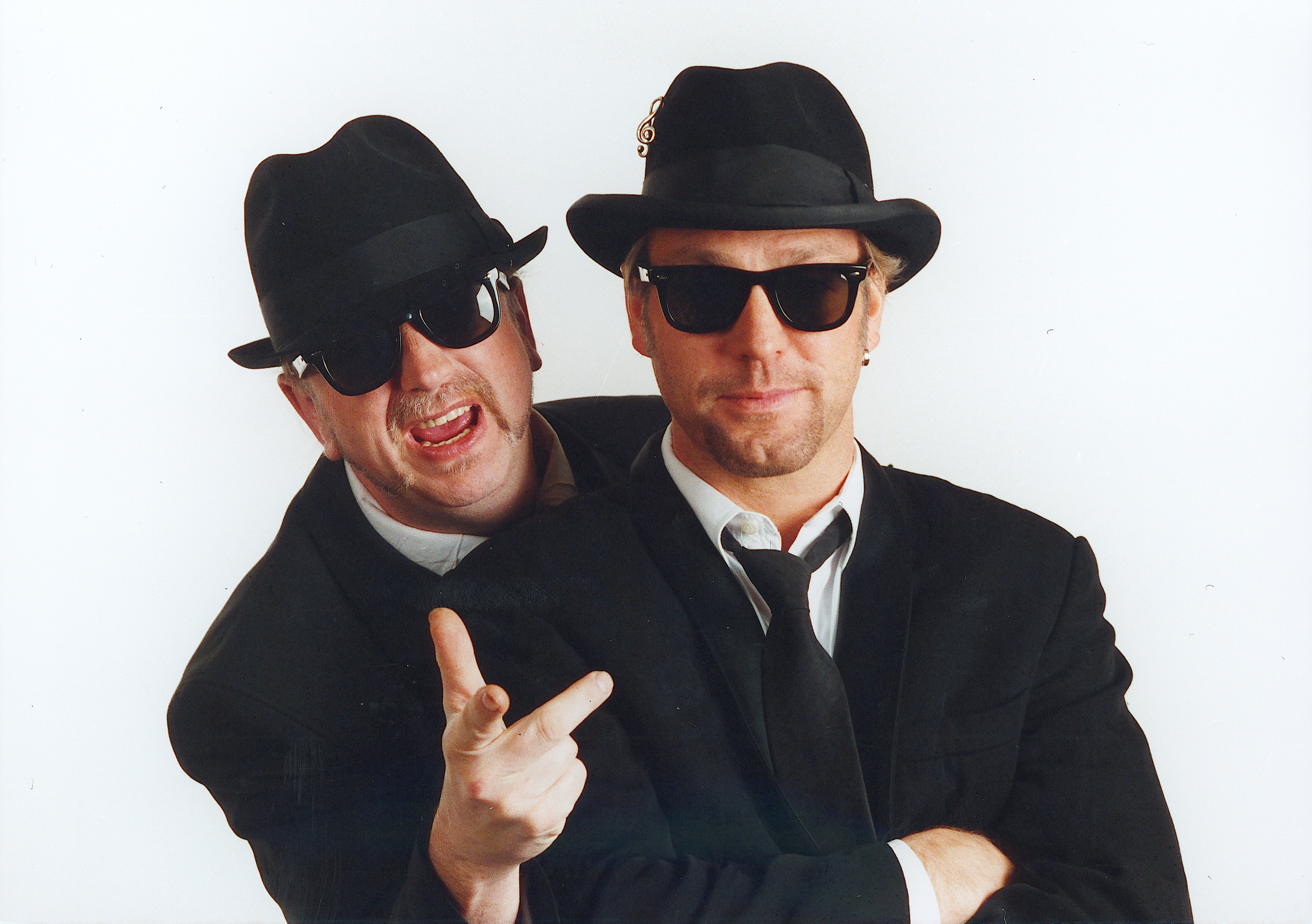
2001

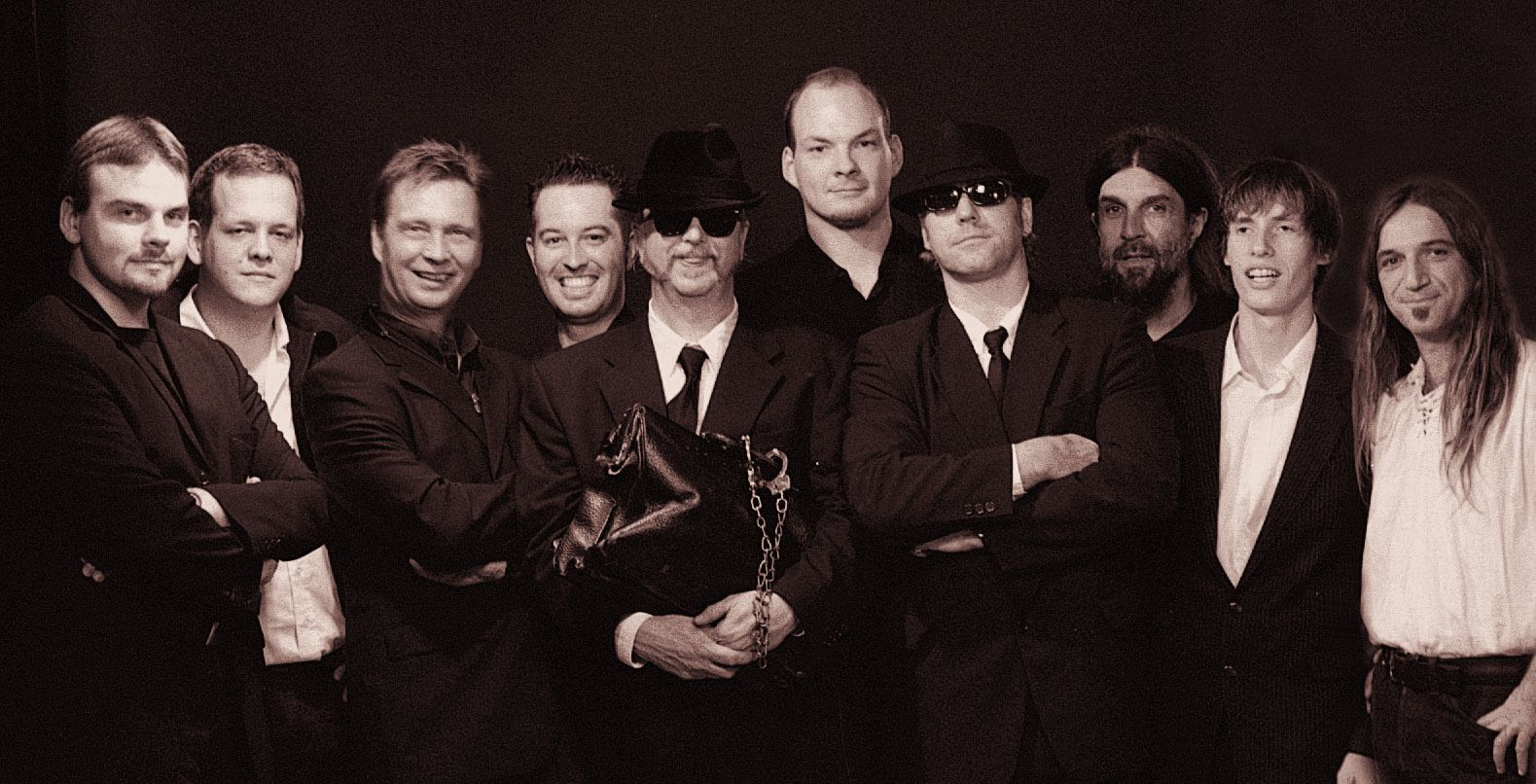
2004

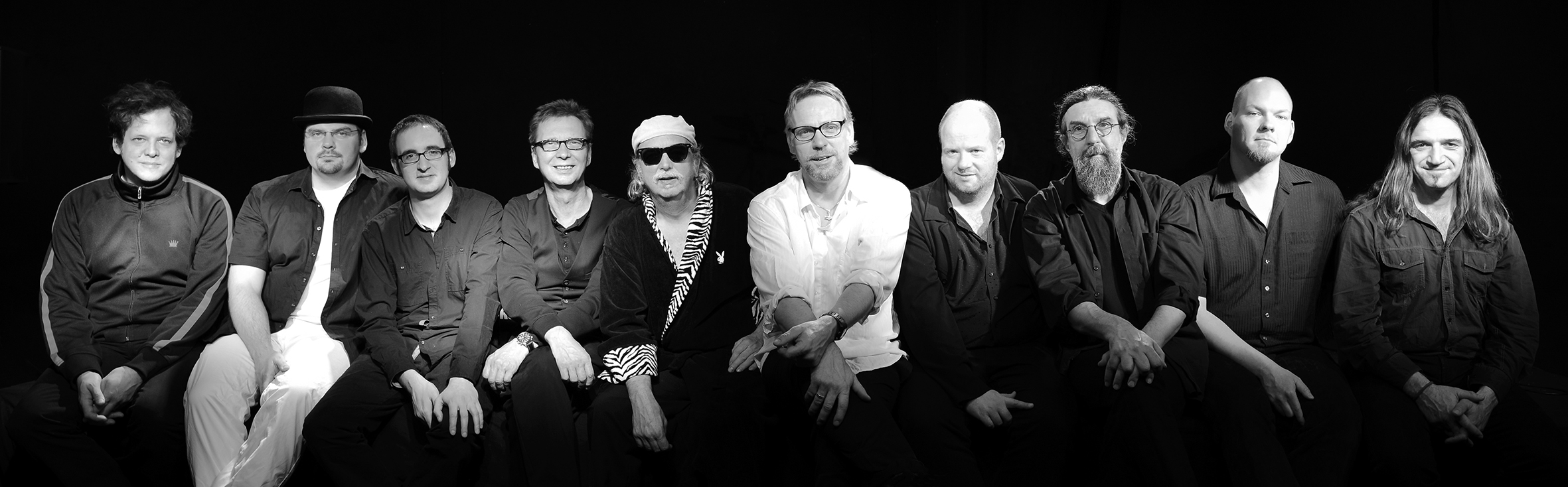
2013

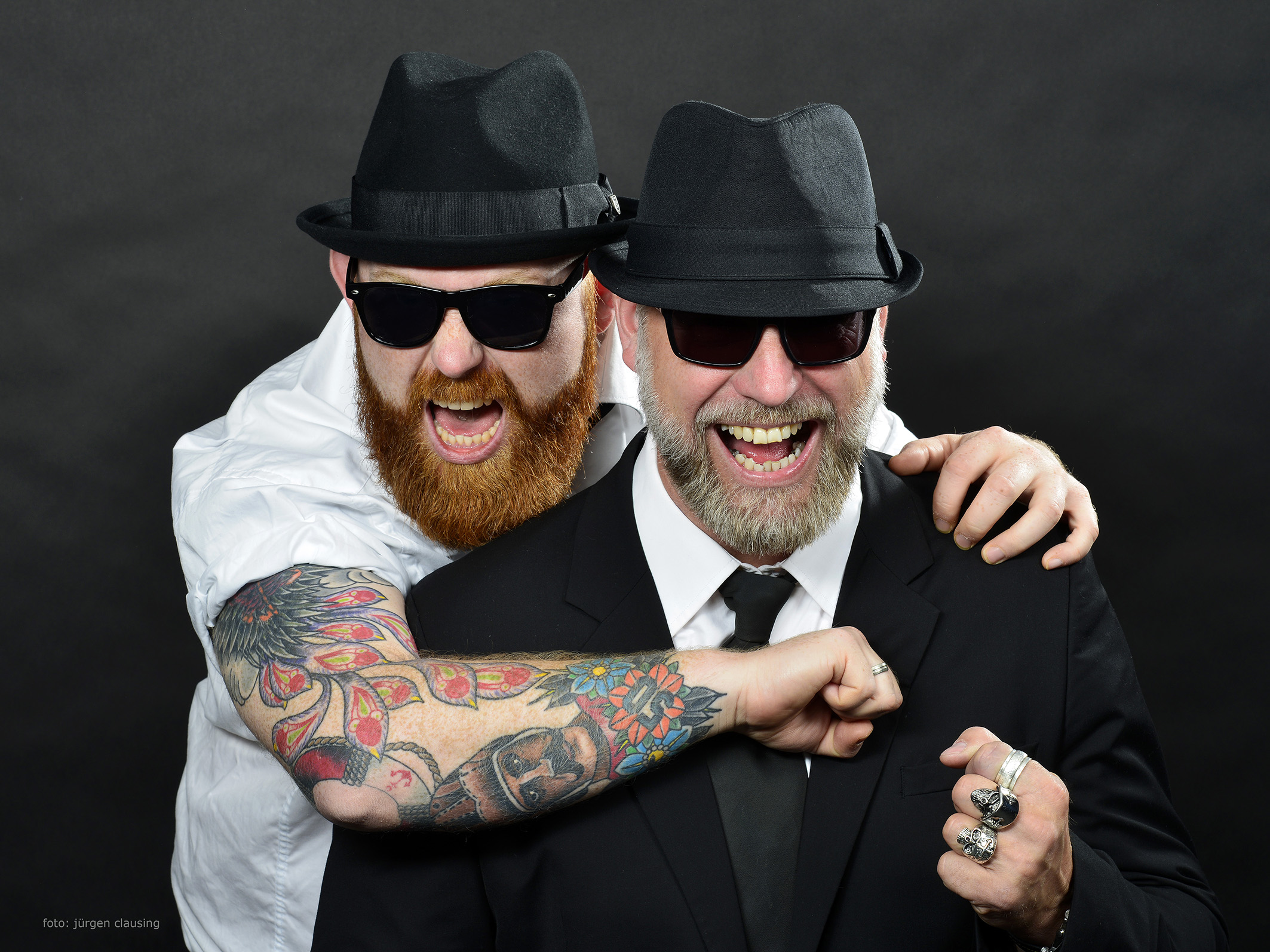
2015

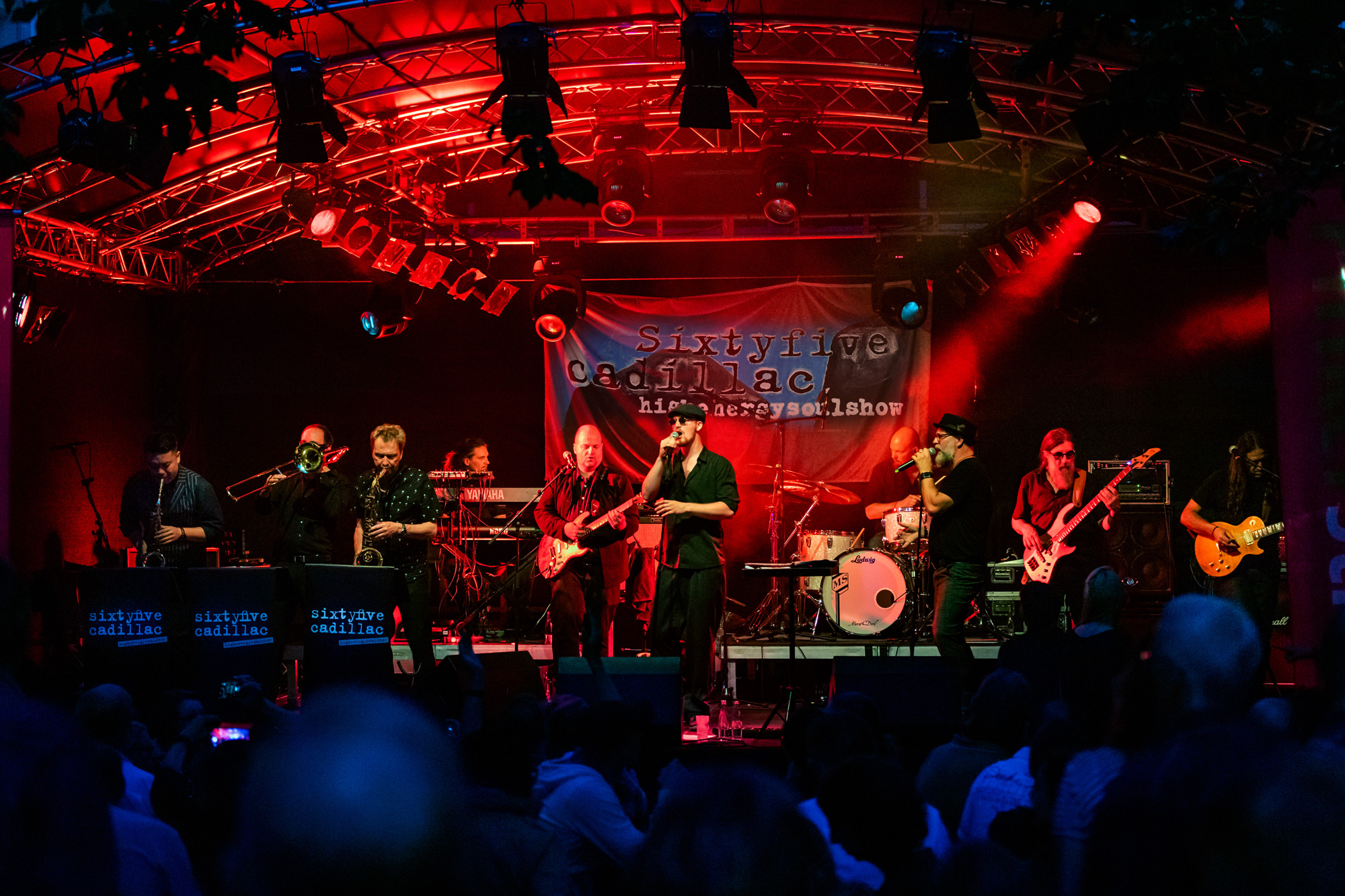
2019

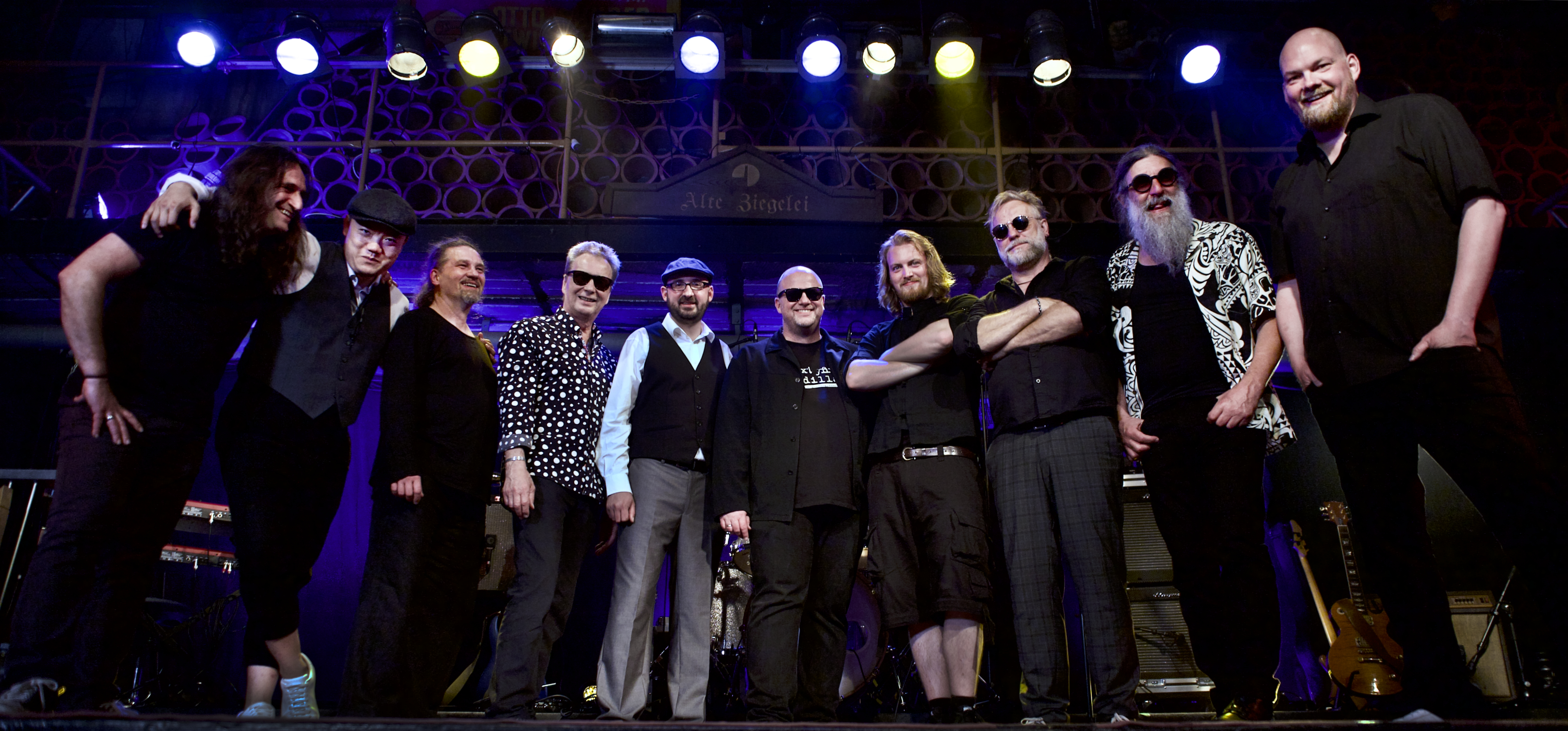
2021

== Bibliography ==
- Matthias Blazek: Das niedersächsische Bandkompendium 1963-2003 – Daten und Fakten von 100 Rockgruppen aus Niedersachsen, Celle 2006, ISBN 978-3-00-018947-0
