= Morio Muscat =

Variety of grape

- Grape (Vitis)
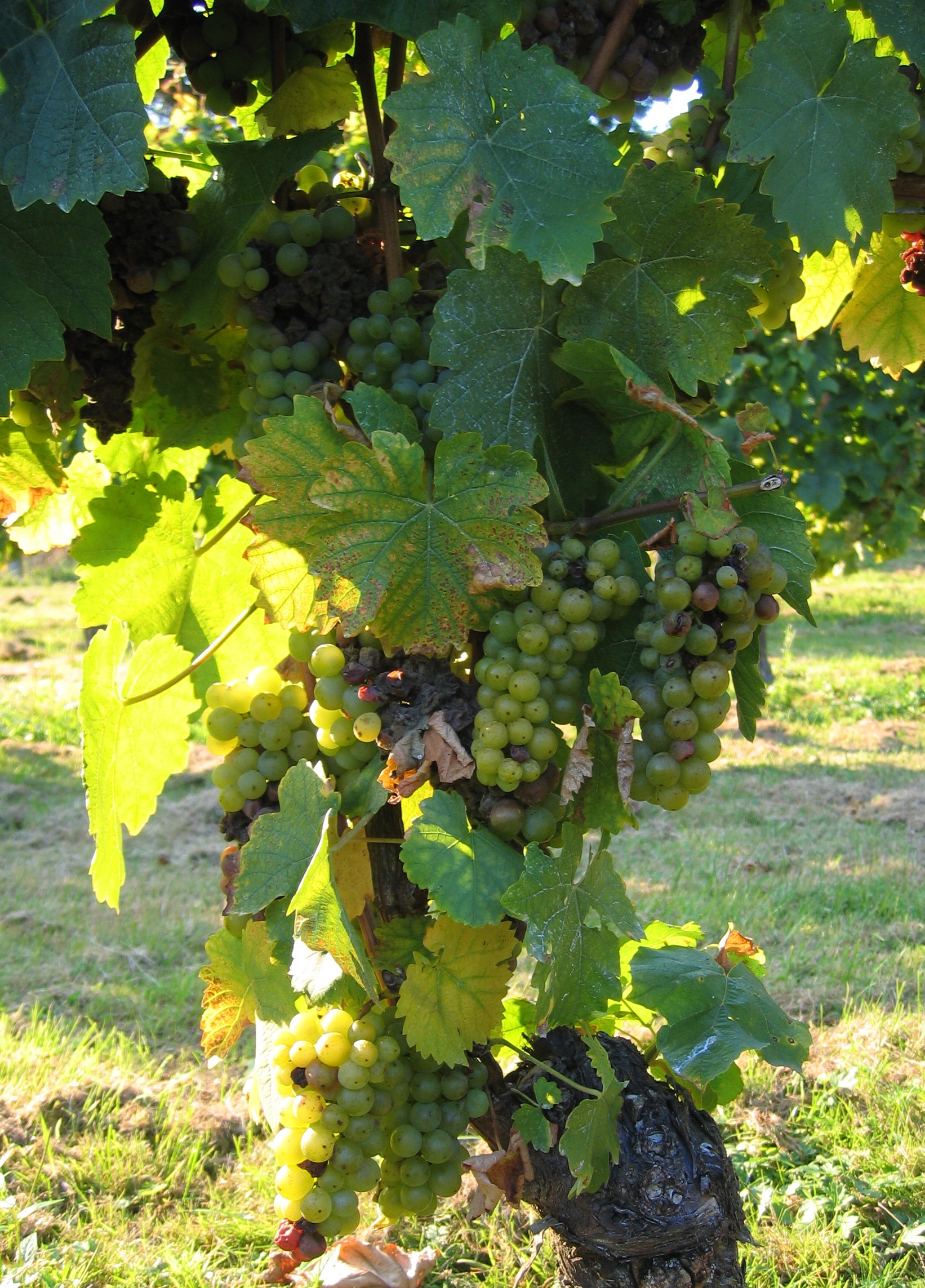
- Morio Muscat in Rheingau, Germany
- Color of berry skin: Blanc
- Species: Vitis vinifera
- Also called: Morio-Muskat
- Origin: Palatinate, Germany
- Notable regions: Germany
- VIVC number: 7996

Morio Muscat (also known as Morio-Muskat) is a white wine grape that was created by viticulturalist Peter Moriot at the Geilweilerhof Institute for Grape Breeding in the Palatinate in 1928. He claimed to have crossed the varieties Silvaner and Pinot blanc, but based on the variety's properties it has been speculated that he actually crossed Silvaner and Muscat Blanc à Petits Grains. But so far this speculation has yet to be conclusively proven. The grape is highly aromatic with a "grapey" characteristic reminiscent of Muscat grape varieties. The grape is rarely used for varietal wines because it requires a high level of ripeness to avoid producing wine with a "mousey" flavor, a coarse texture and overabundance of acidity.

== Origins ==
Viticulturalist Peter Morio created this grape variety from, what was reported as, Silvaner and Weissburgunder (Pinot blanc) as a potential blending partner for Müller-Thurgau and component in Liebfraumilch. Despite being the offspring of two grape varieties (Silvaner & Pinot blanc) that are not very aromatic, the Morio Muscat is a very aromatic grape variety with aromas more closely aligned with the Muscat family.

== Wine regions ==
Morio Muscat remains the most popular "Muscat" in Germany, despite the possibility that the grape might not be a member of the Muscat family. The grape was used extensively in Germany in the 1970s as a blending companion to Müller-Thurgau to enhance the aroma of the latter, but has been in steep decline in recent years. In 2006 it was cultivated on 541 hectares (1,340 acres) of vineyard in Germany, down from 1,167 hectares (2,880 acres) in 1999.

At its peak popularity, the grape was widely planted in the German wine regions of Palatinate and Rheinhessen. Outside of Germany, there are small plantings in South Africa and Canada.

== Viticulture ==
Morio Muscat has the potential to be a varietal wine but require ideal vineyard locations, similar to what would normally be planted with Silvaner, and has to be harvested at a point where its naturally low sugar levels and medium to high acidity are not out of balance. Common viticultural hazards include a sensitivity to rot with the grape often needing at least an extra week to ripen after Müller-Thurgau has been harvested. It also has some sensitivity to downy mildew and oidium.

== Synonyms ==
The only synonyms of Morio Muscat, other than the alternative spelling Muscat or Muskat, is its breeding code I-28-30 or Geilweilerhof I-28-30.
