= Deidesheim (Verbandsgemeinde) =

- Verbandsgemeinde
- Location of Deidesheim within Bad Dürkheim district
- Interactive map of Deidesheim
- Location within Germany Location within Rhineland-Palatinate
- Coordinates: 49°24′N 8°11′E
- Country: Germany
- State: Rhineland-Palatinate
- District: Bad Dürkheim
- Seat: Deidesheim
- Subdivisions: 5 municipalities

Area
  - Total: 57.02 km^{2} (22.02 sq mi)

Population (2025-12-31)
  - Total: 11,414
  - Density: 200.2/km^{2} (518.5/sq mi)
- Time zone: UTC+01:00 (CET)
  - Summer (DST): UTC+02:00 (CEST)
- Website: www.vg-deidesheim.de

Deidesheim is a Verbandsgemeinde ("collective municipality") in the district of Bad Dürkheim, Rhineland-Palatinate, Germany. The seat of the Verbandsgemeinde is in Deidesheim.

The Verbandsgemeinde Deidesheim consists of the following Ortsgemeinden ("local municipalities"):

1. Deidesheim
2. Forst an der Weinstraße
3. Meckenheim
4. Niederkirchen bei Deidesheim
5. Ruppertsberg
