= Niederkirchen bei Deidesheim =

- Municipality
- Coat of arms

- Location of Niederkirchen bei Deidesheim within Bad Dürkheim district
- Interactive map of Niederkirchen bei Deidesheim
- Location within Germany Location within Rhineland-Palatinate
- Coordinates: 49°24′54″N 8°12′36″E
- Country: Germany
- State: Rhineland-Palatinate
- District: Bad Dürkheim
- Municipal assoc.: Deidesheim

Government
  - Mayor (2019–24): Stefan Stähly (FW)

Area
  - Total: 3.78 km^{2} (1.46 sq mi)
- Elevation: 110 m (360 ft)

Population (2025-12-31)
  - Total: 2,247
  - Density: 594/km^{2} (1,540/sq mi)
- Time zone: UTC+01:00 (CET)
  - Summer (DST): UTC+02:00 (CEST)
- Postal codes: 67150
- Dialling codes: 06326
- Vehicle registration: DÜW
- Website: www.niederkirchen.de

Niederkirchen is an Ortsgemeinde – a municipality belonging to a Verbandsgemeinde, a kind of collective municipality – in the Bad Dürkheim district in Rhineland-Palatinate, Germany. Its population is roughly 2,400.

== Geography ==
=== Location ===
Niederkirchen lies 2 km east of Deidesheim. The municipality belongs to the Verbandsgemeinde of Deidesheim, whose seat is in the like-named town.

== History ==
In 699, Niederkirchen had its first documentary mention as Didinnes-chaime in a document from the Weißenburg Monastery in what is now Wissembourg in Alsace, France. The first documentary proof of winegrowing in the vicinity stems from a document from Fulda Abbey, dated to 770. With the building of the Romanesque church with its striking tower, begun in 1060 and still standing today, Niederkirchen acquired its landmark. In the course of the 11th century, the village passed into the ownership of the Prince-Bishops of Speyer. It is believed that in the 13th century, the current Deidesheim split away from the municipality, whereafter the municipality's name changed first to Unterdeidesheim and then Niederdeidesheim (both meaning "Lower Deidesheim"), later settling on Niederkirchen. Its location in the heart of Europe time and again brought Niederkirchen misfortune in wars. Thus it was in the Thirty Years' War, as a result of which the village almost died out. With the annexation of the lands on the Rhine's left bank by French militia in 1794, Niederkirchen became part of the French Republic, and in 1798 it was assigned to the Department of Mont-Tonnerre (or Donnersberg in German). From 1815 to 1935 the municipality belonged to Bavaria and was then part of the Gau of Saarpfalz in National Socialist times. As of 1940, this became the Gau Westmark, which included parts of Alsace-Lorraine. Since 1946, Niederkirchen has been part of the then newly formed state of Rhineland-Palatinate.

=== Religion ===
In 2007, 70% of the inhabitants were Catholic and 17.1% Evangelical. The rest belonged to other faiths or adhered to none.

== Politics ==
=== Municipal council ===
The municipal election held on 7 June 2009 yielded the following results:

Party	Results in %	No. of seats
CDU	59,3 (+2,6)	10 (+1)
FWG	33,2 (-10,1)	5 (-2)
SPD	7,6 (+7,6)	1 (+1)

=== Mayors ===
The Mayor of Niederkirchen is Stefan Stähly.

=== Coat of arms ===
The German blazon reads: In Rot ein schwebendes angetatztes goldenes Kreuz, oben links und unten rechts bewinkelt von je einem sechsstrahligen silbernen Stern.

The municipality's arms might in English heraldic language be described thus: Gules a cross pattée humetty Or between two mullets argent, one each in sinister chief and dexter base.

The arms were approved in 1927 by the Bavarian State Ministry of the Interior and go back to the arms borne by Deidesheim, from which Niederkirchen originally split. To distinguish the two coats, the tinctures and the arrangement of the mullets (star shapes) were altered.

An earlier seal showed two crossed swords and a star. Yet another coat of arms, used by Niederkirchen in the 19th century, was the same as the one still used today except that the cross was azure (blue) instead of Or (gold). Upon the official granting of the arms on 27 December 1927, the cross's tincture was changed because it was "not heraldically correct".

== Culture and sightseeing ==
=== Buildings ===
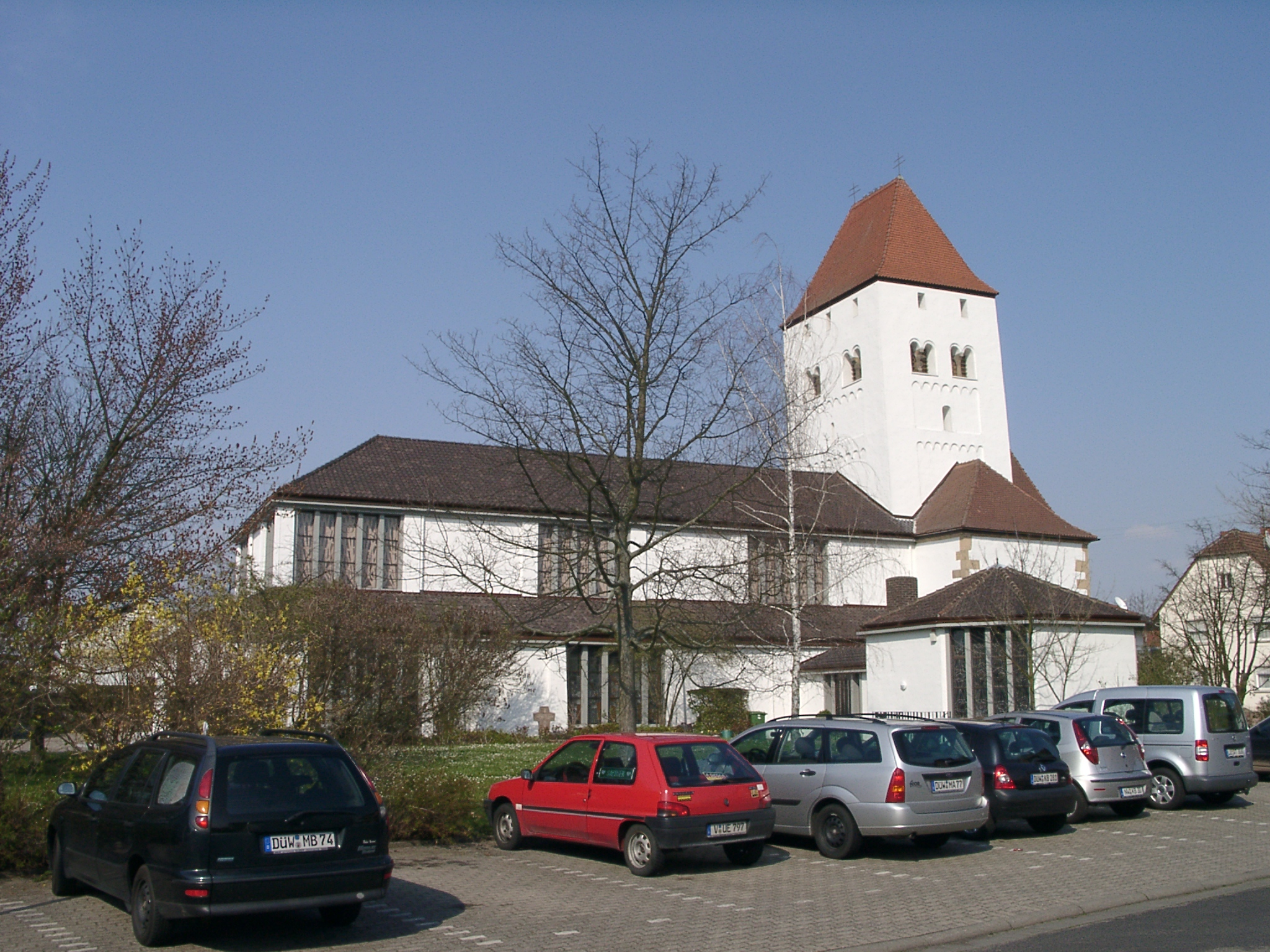
St. Martin's Parish Church

The Catholic Saint Martin's Parish Church (Pfarrkirche St. Martin) is one of the Palatinate's oldest Christian building monuments. The church had its first documentary mention in 1235. Building features, however, lead to the conclusion that its striking Romanesque crossing tower has its beginnings in the latter half of the 11th century. The church's quire is believed to have come from the time about 1300, while the nave was built onto the church in 1955 and 1956. The crossing tower originally also fulfilled the function of a sanctuary, making it a sanctuary tower, a widely found building type in mediaeval country churches.

As one of the few preserved 11th-century churches in the Palatinate and because of its immediate proximity to the stylistically similar Limburg Monastery church near Bad Dürkheim and to Speyer Cathedral, the Niederkirchen parish church is of special importance to art history.

=== Sport ===
Surely the greatest success for a team from the Province was scored by the women's football team from TuS Niederkirchen, the local gymnastic and sport club, when they won the German championship in 1993.

=== Regular events ===
On the last weekend in June, the Fest um den Wein ("Festival About Wine") is held in Niederkirchen which, as the name suggests, is a wine festival. At this time, local winemaking businesses run temporary wine bars round the village square.

== Famous people ==
=== Sons and daughters of the town ===
- Susanne Winterling, Palatine Wine Queen 2006/2007, German Wine Princess 2007/2008
