= Ruppertsberg =

- Municipality
- Flag Coat of arms

- Location of Ruppertsberg within Bad Dürkheim district
- Interactive map of Ruppertsberg
- Location within Germany Location within Rhineland-Palatinate
- Coordinates: 49°24′01″N 8°11′45″E
- Country: Germany
- State: Rhineland-Palatinate
- District: Bad Dürkheim
- Municipal assoc.: Deidesheim

Government
  - Mayor (2019–24): Heiner Weisbrodt

Area
  - Total: 8.07 km^{2} (3.12 sq mi)
- Elevation: 117 m (384 ft)

Population (2025-12-31)
  - Total: 1,374
  - Density: 170/km^{2} (441/sq mi)
- Time zone: UTC+01:00 (CET)
  - Summer (DST): UTC+02:00 (CEST)
- Postal codes: 67152
- Dialling codes: 06326
- Vehicle registration: DÜW
- Website: www.ruppertsberg.de

Ruppertsberg is an Ortsgemeinde – a municipality belonging to a Verbandsgemeinde, a kind of collective municipality – in the Bad Dürkheim district in Rhineland-Palatinate, Germany.

== Geography ==
=== Location ===
The municipality is a winegrowing centre with a long tradition in the field, and is part of the Rhine-Neckar urban agglomeration. Ruppertsberg belongs to the Verbandsgemeinde of Deidesheim, whose seat is in the like-named town.

== History ==
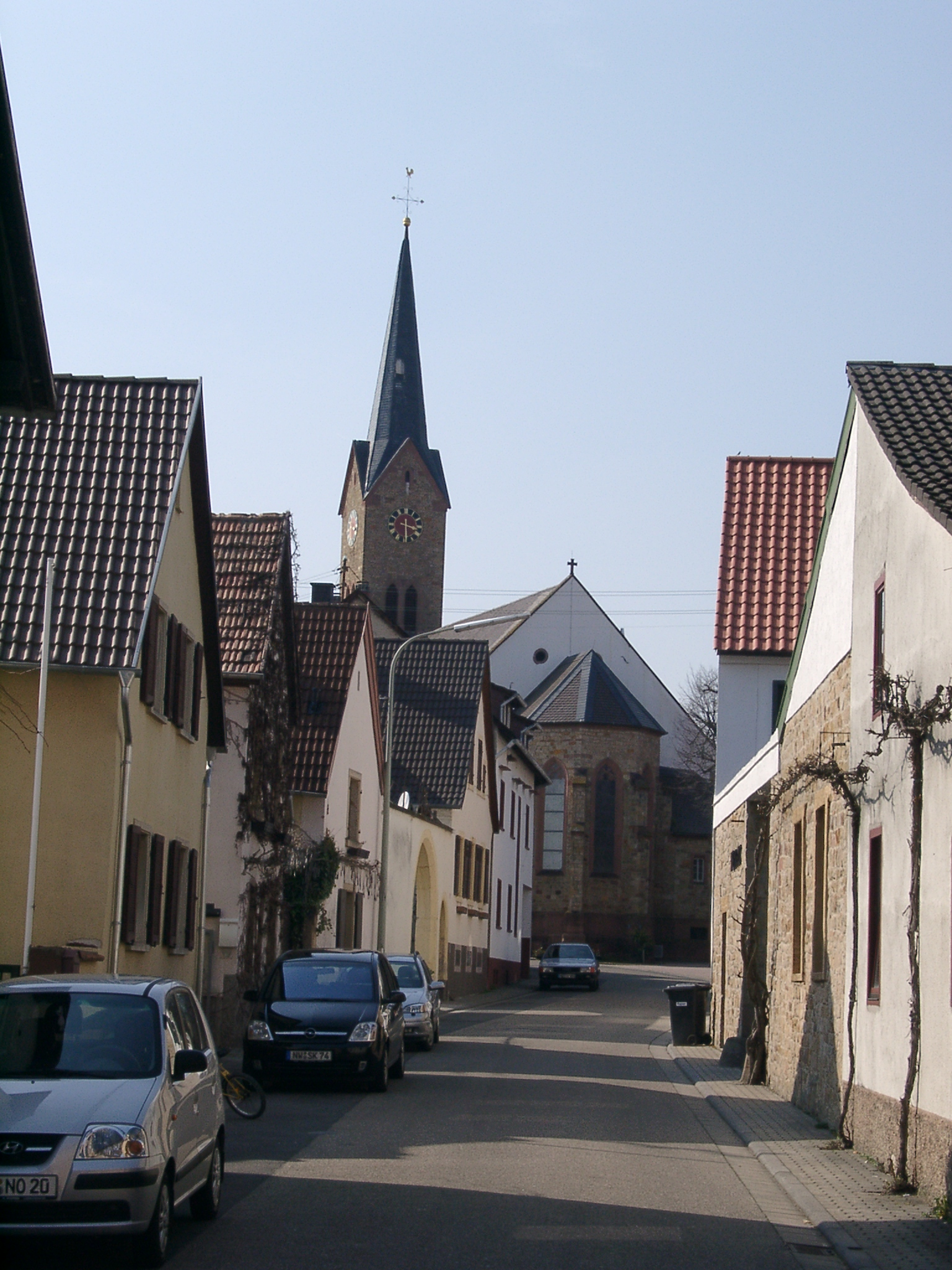
St. Martin's Parish Church in Ruppertsberg

In 1040, Ruppertsberg had its first documentary mention. Most likely it grew out of the Hoheburg (castle) beginning in 800. About 1100, the last Count of the Kraichgau donated the village to the Bishopric of Speyer, which then enfeoffed the Knights of Ruppertsberg with it. In the 14th century, Imperial troops destroyed the castle, whereupon the Knights built a moated castle, the so-called Schloss, in the village's northeast. After the destruction wrought by the Thirty Years' War, only two families were left in Ruppertsberg.

After the French Revolution, the village became part of the Department of Mont-Tonnerre (or Donnersberg in German), until in 1815, the Congress of Vienna assigned it, together with the rest of the Palatinate, to Bavaria. After the Second World War, the new state of Rhineland-Palatinate was formed. Since 1973, Ruppertsberg has belonged to the Verbandsgemeinde of Deidesheim.

=== Religion ===
In 2007, 63% of the inhabitants were Catholic and 19.4% Evangelical. The rest belonged to other faiths or adhered to none.

== Politics ==
=== Municipal council ===
The municipal election held on 7 June 2009 yielded the following results:

Party	Result in %	No. of seats
CDU	52.0 (+3.1)	9 (+1)
FWG	35.6 (−8.7)	5 (−2)
SPD	12.4 (+5.7)	2 (+1)

=== Mayor ===
Ruppertsberg's mayor is Heiner Weisbrodt.

=== Coat of arms ===
The German blazon reads: In Gold ein in den Ecken gemauerter schwarzer Turm mit vier Zinnen über einer schwarzen Mauer mit je einer Zinnen rechts und links und mit einem offenen Spitztor, darin in Gold eine grünbestielte blaue Traube.

The municipality's arms might in English heraldic language be described thus: Or a tower embattled of four and masoned at the corners sable on a wall of the same with a merlon at each end, in base a gateway with pointed arch of the field in which a bunch of grapes azure slipped vert.

The arms were approved in 1955 by the Mainz Ministry of the Interior. They replaced the old armorial bearing which bore the letters “BS” flanking a charge that does not seem to be identifiable. It looked like a rake or perhaps a harrow. Many explanations have been put forth (a tool of some kind, a village symbol, somebody's monogram, a charge from the arms borne by the old feudal lords, and still others). The current arms are meant to represent the Knights’ castle and, with the bunch of grapes, the local winegrowing.

=== Town partnerships ===
Ruppertsberg fosters partnerships with the following places:

- Courpière, Puy-de-Dôme, France
- (Germany) Höchstädt an der Donau, Dillingen, Bavaria

== Culture and sightseeing ==
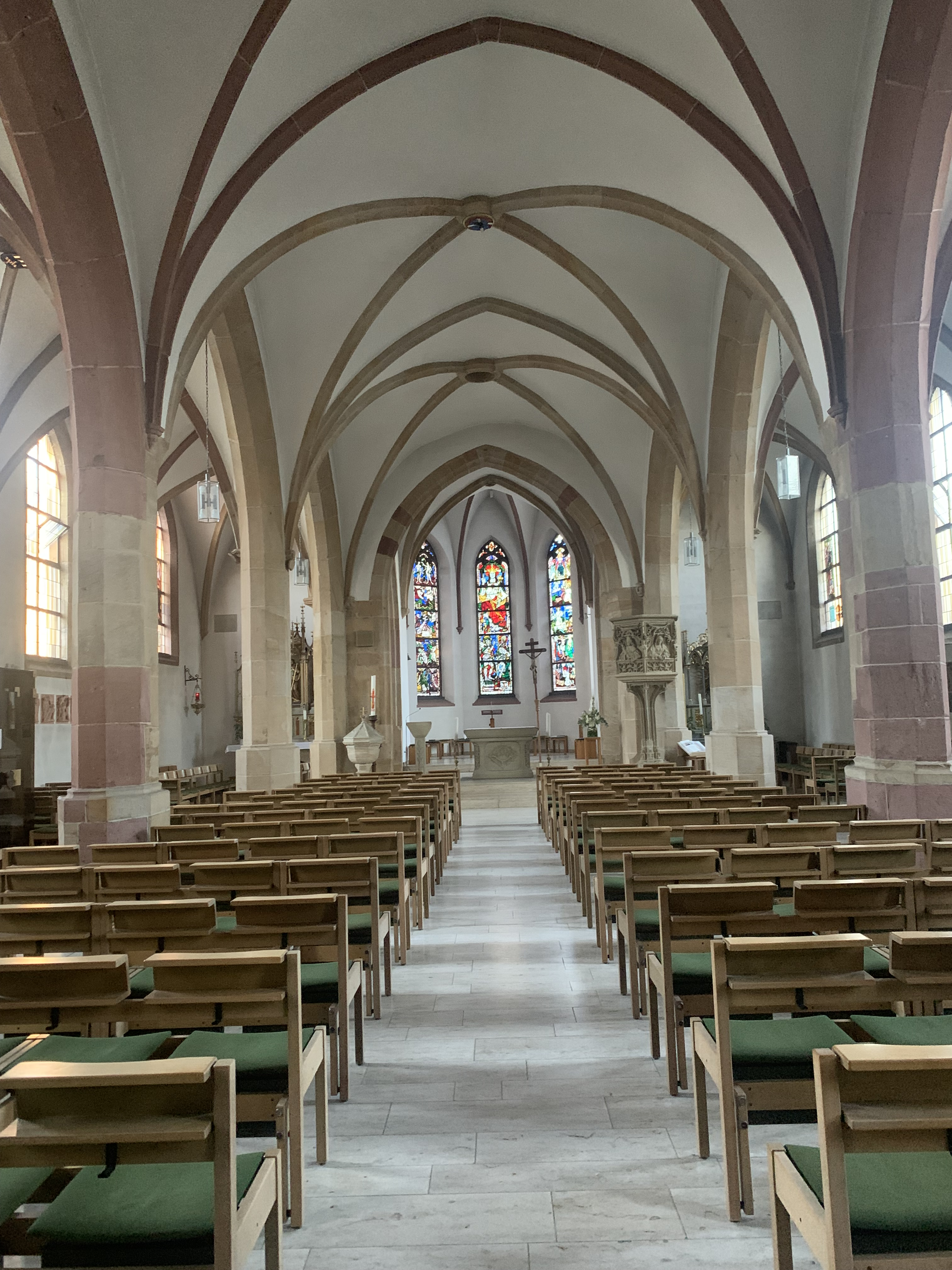
Interior of St. Martin's Parish Church

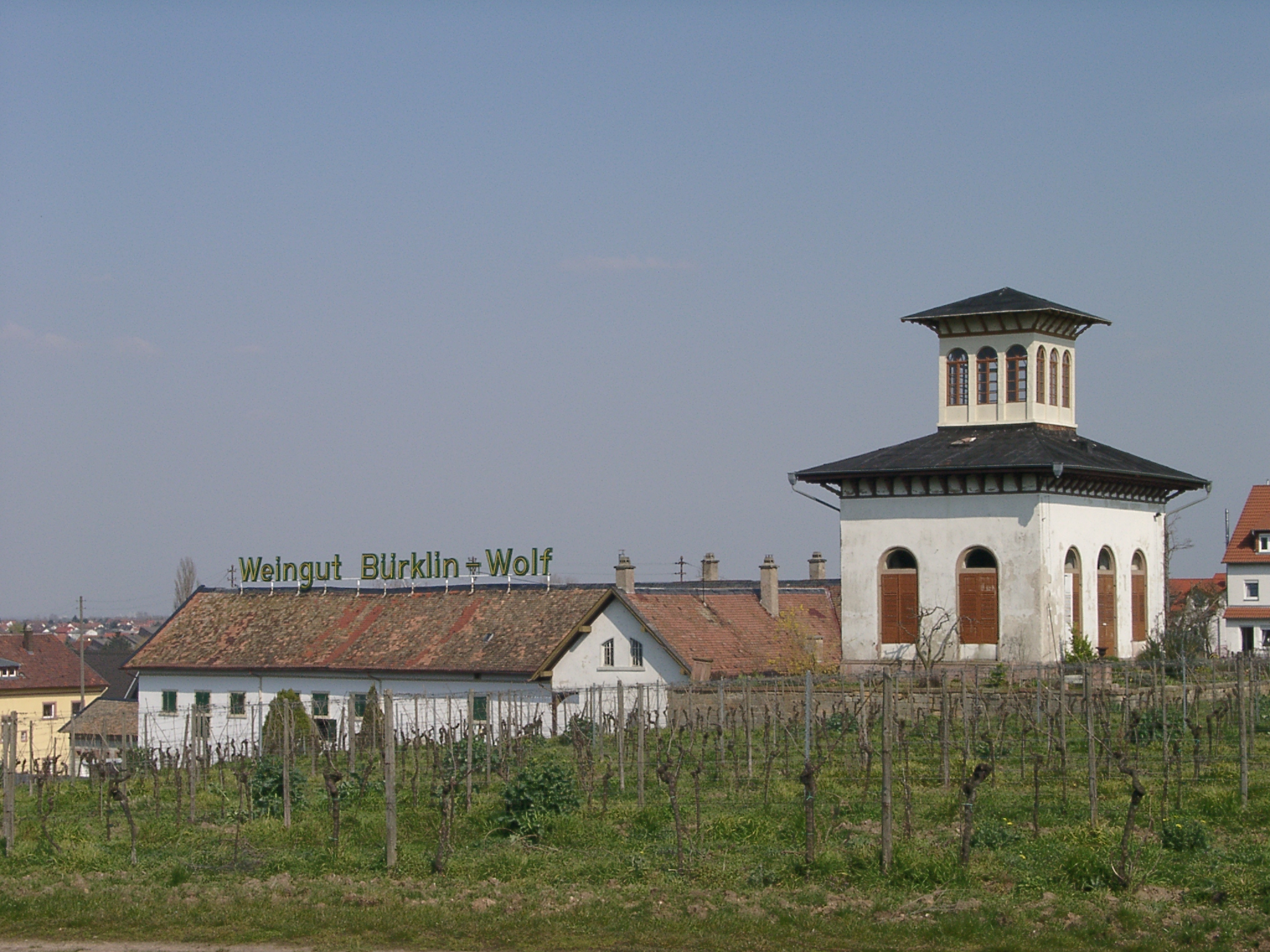
Tea house

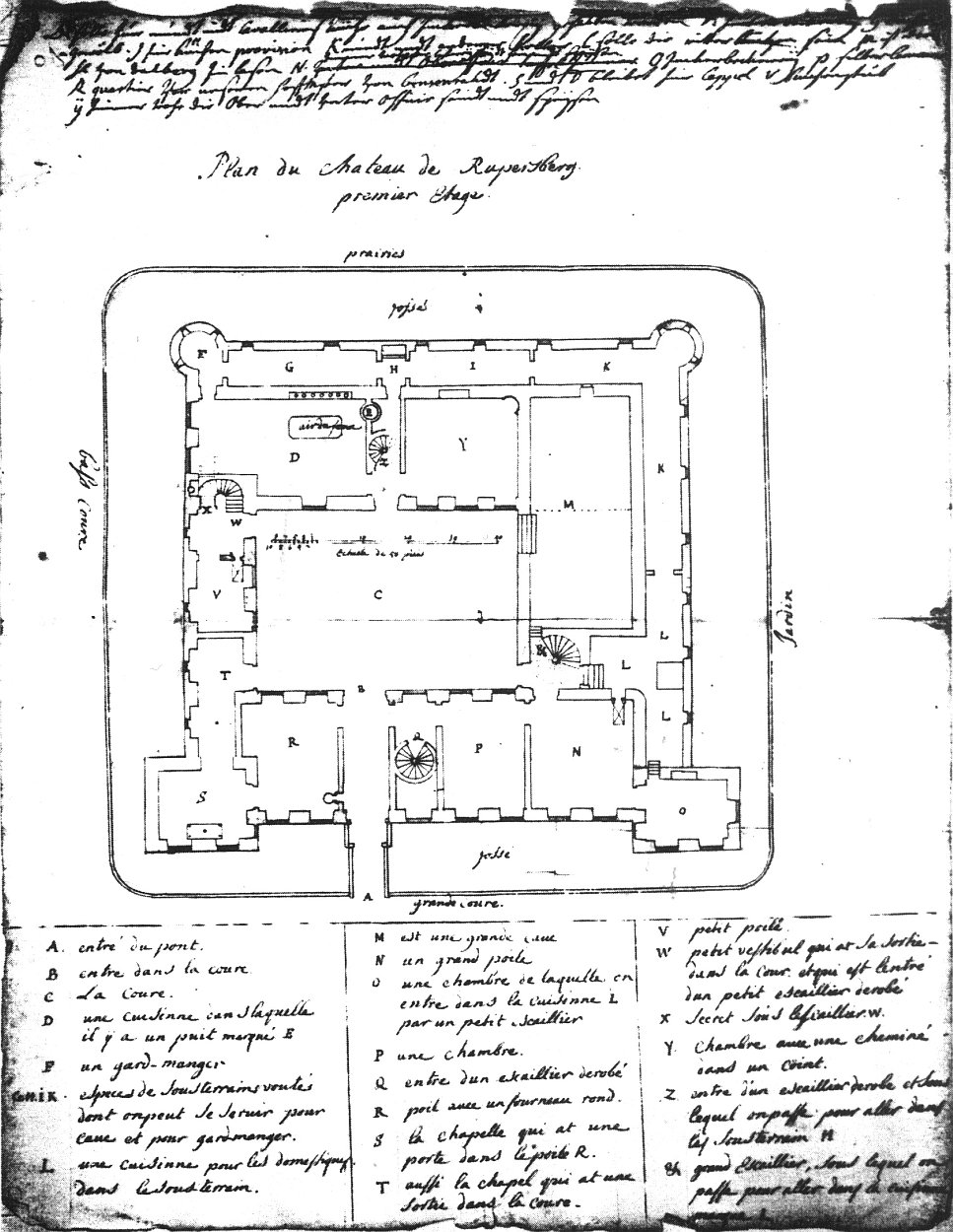
Plan of Schloss Ruppertsberg from 1719

=== Buildings ===
Saint Martin's Catholic Parish Church (Katholische Pfarrkirche St. Martin) in Ruppertsberg is a three-naved Late Gothic building from the early 16th century. Particularly worth seeing is the stone pulpit, created about 1510 with its images of saints and prophets.

The former Teehaus (tea house) is Ruppertsberg's landmark. It was built in 1840 a few hundred metres west of the village in the vineyards on the model of the one at the English Garden in Munich. The former tea house is a big rectangular pavilion with a glazed upper floor.

Of the moated castle (Wasserburg) on the northeast side of the municipality, expanded into a residential castle (Schloss) in the 18th century under Damian Hugo Philipp von Schönborn, two of the original four wings have been preserved. Owing to later conversions, the building's character as a residential castle has been all but lost.

=== Regular events ===
The Ruppertsberger Weinkerwe (wine fair) is held each year on the last weekend in August. The Sunday of this weekend is also Erlebnistag Deutsche Weinstraße (“German Wine Route Adventure Day”).

== Economy and infrastructure ==
=== Winegrowing ===
The municipality is characterized to a considerable extent by winegrowing and is among the Palatinate’s biggest winegrowing centres.

Appellations are:

- Linsenbusch
- Hoheburg
- Gaisböhl
- Nußbien
- Spieß
- Reiterpfad

=== Transport ===
Nearby Deidesheim station on the Pfälzische Nordbahn affords rail links to Bad Dürkheim and Neustadt an der Weinstraße. Moreover, buslines lead to surrounding places. Public transport is integrated into the VRN, whose fares therefore apply.

East of the municipality runs Bundesstraße 271. In the southeast there is a connection to the Autobahn A 65 through the Deidesheim interchange.

== Famous people ==
=== Sons and daughters of the town ===
- Eduard Nortz (1868–1939), politician (BBB)
- Edmund Bien (1927–2007), Bundesliga referee

=== Famous people associated with the municipality ===
- Johann Kaspar Adolay (1771–1825), politician
