= Leiningerland =

Historic landscape in Rhineland-Palatinate, Germany

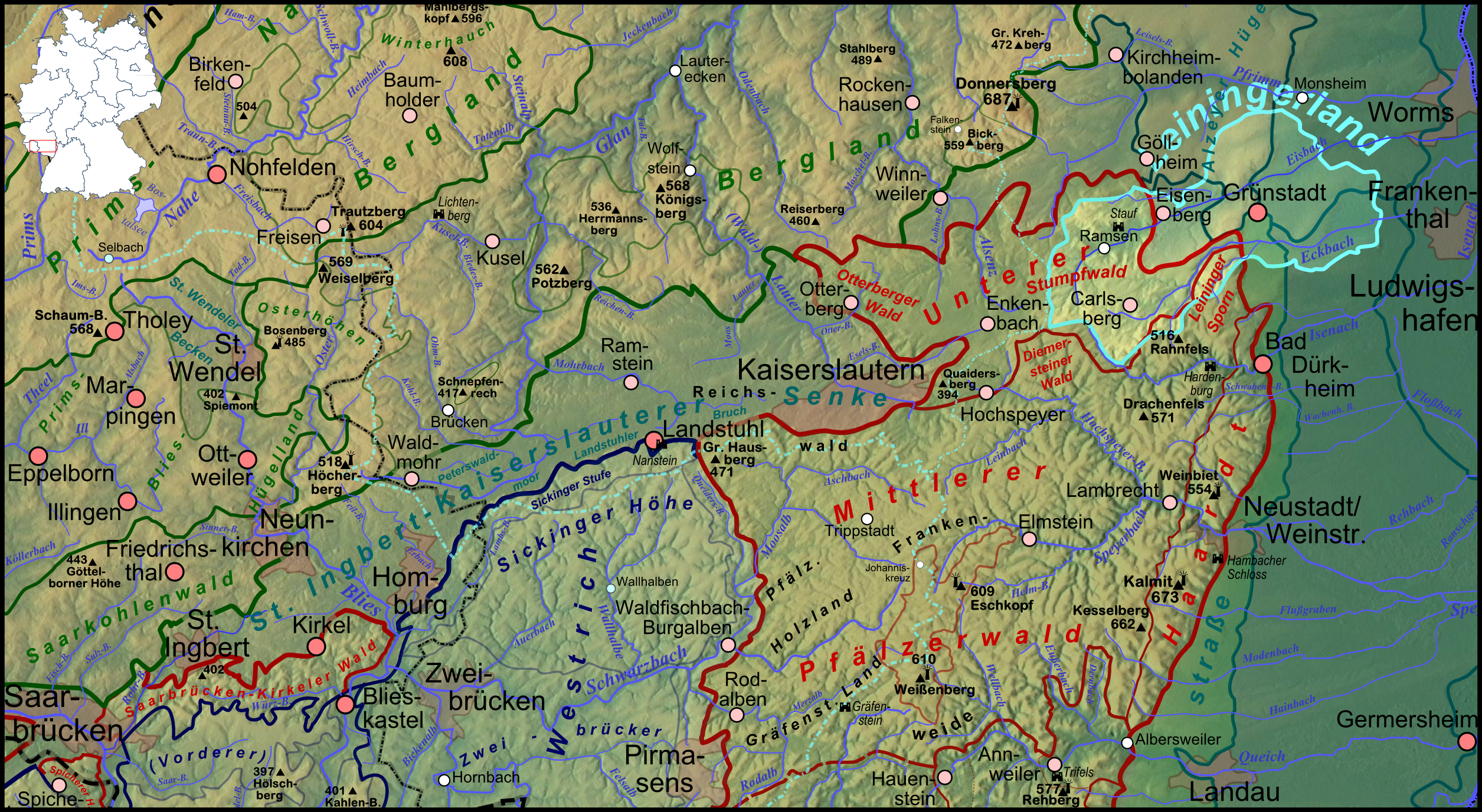
Leiningerland (outlined in light blue)

The Leiningerland (German pronunciation: [ˈlaɪnɪŋɐlant]) is a historic landscape in the Palatinate region in the German federal state of Rhineland-Palatinate. It is named after an aristocratic family that used to be the most important in the region, the House of Leiningen.

== Geography ==
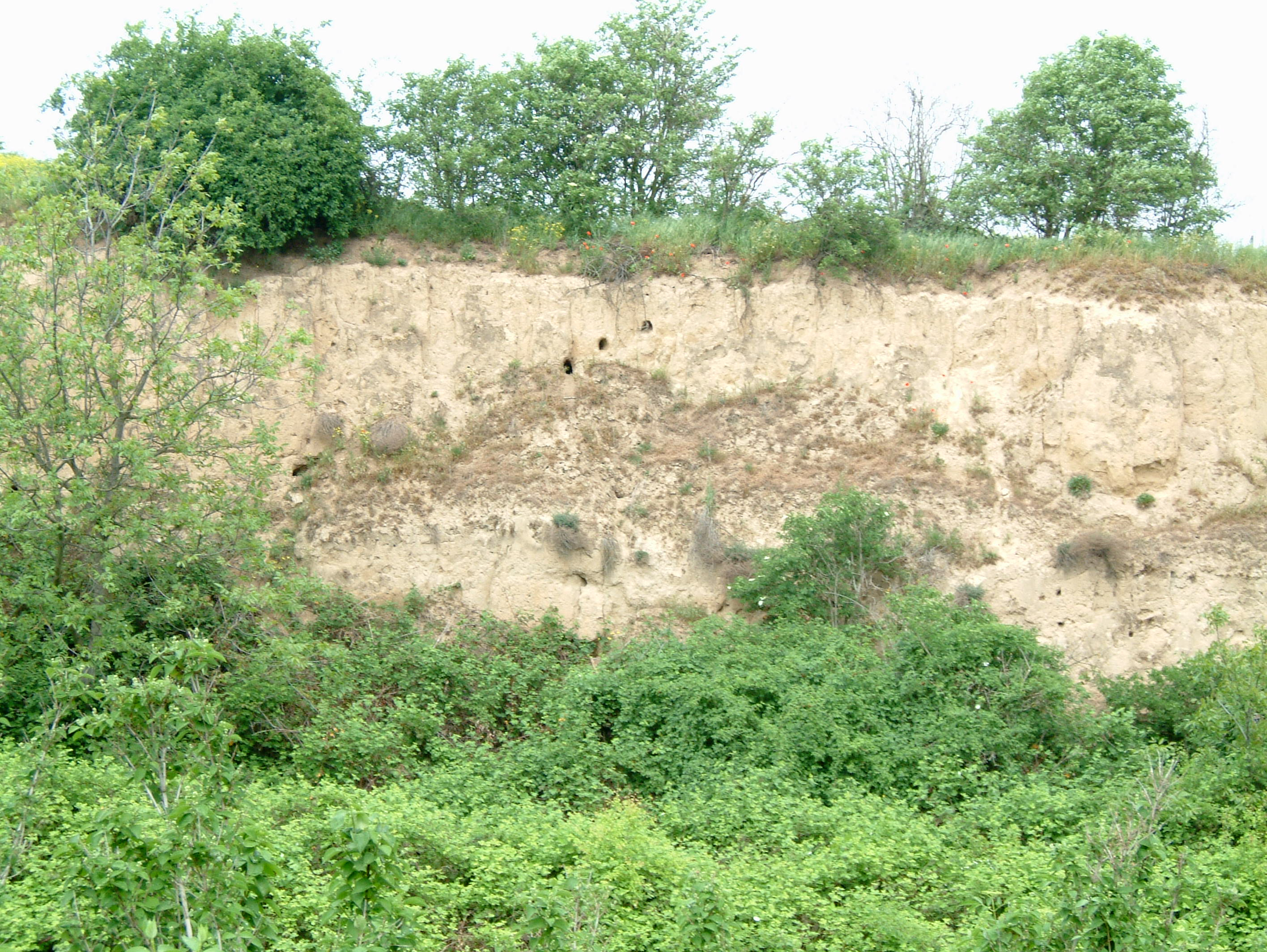
A loess wall, a natural monument and biotope

The Leiningerland lies in northeast Palatinate, mostly in the county of Bad Dürkheim. Its area coincides with large parts of the collective municipalities of Hettenleidelheim and Grünstadt-Land as well as the town of Grünstadt. Also a part of the historic Leiningerland is the region around the town of Eisenberg, which is in the county of Donnersbergkreis today. Its total area is just under 200 km^{2}.

The region does not have a uniform topography, but shares in three geological features: the Central Uplands, the Rhine Rift Valley and the Rhine Plain. the Leiningerland extends from the northeastern foothills of the Palatine Forest in the west across the northern part of the German Wine Road near Grünstadt to Dirmstein in the east, where the vineyards spread out into the Upper Rhine Plain. The village of Dirmstein itself, which is today included in the Leinigerland, was never owned by the House of Leiningen, however.

Depending on altitude - about 400 metres in the west to about 100 metres to the east - the climate of the different areas also varies. The soils in the area of the fault scarp benefit from fertile loess deposits whilst, in places, there are steep rock faces on the scarp slopes which are a result of erosion and which are now classified as natural monuments and biotopes.

The Leinigerland is drained by two, orographically left-hand tributaries of the Rhine: the Eckbach and den Eisbach.

== History ==
Leiningen coat of arms according to the GHdA

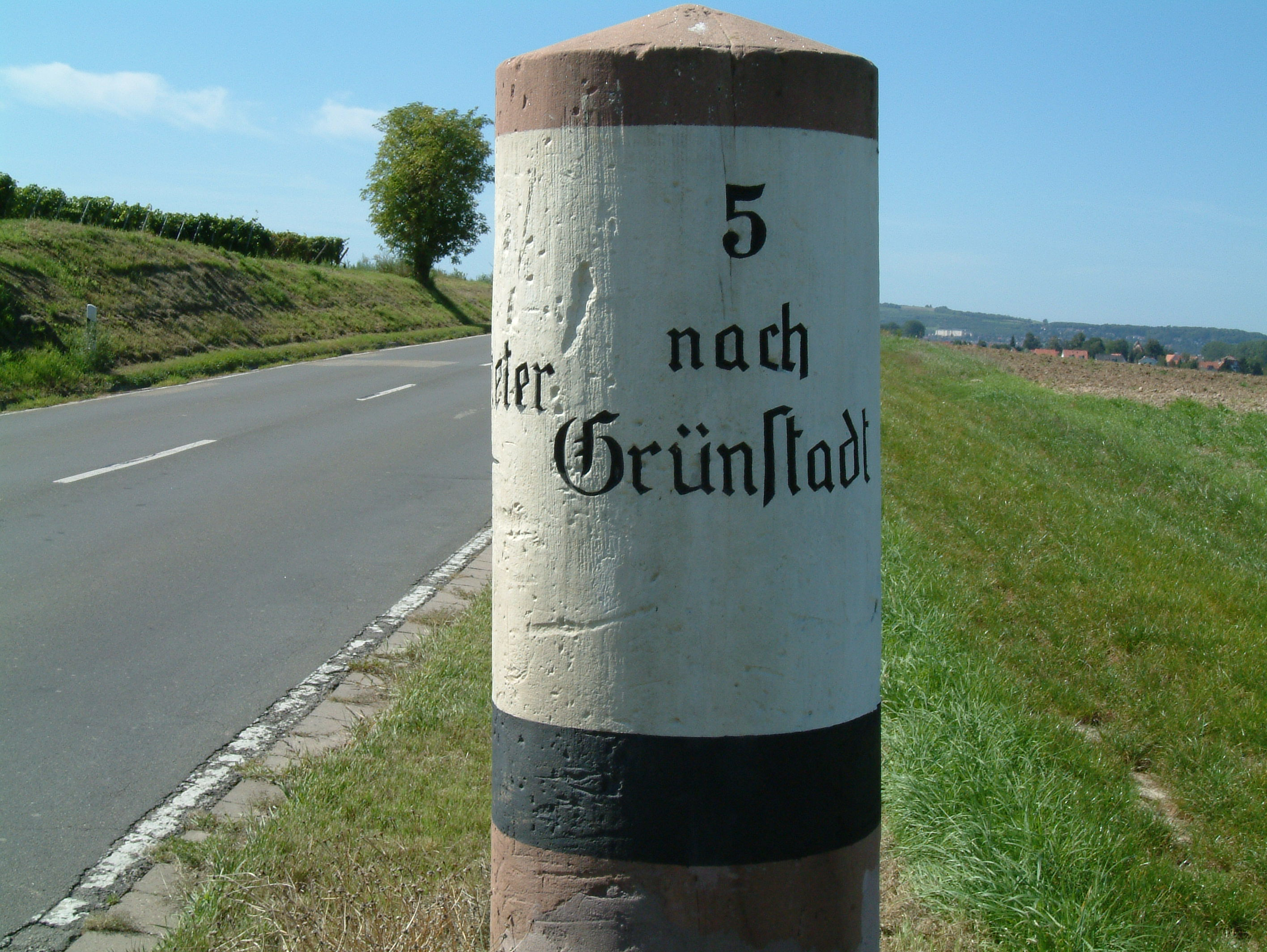
Hour column from the time of Bavarian rule

In the Middle Ages, the Eckbach stream was called the Leinbach, which referred to the so-called Leinbaum or Norway maple. At that time, both the maple and the large-leaved lime occurred locally, especially on the banks of the Eckbach. The old name of the stream may have been the origin of the name given to the castle seat of the House of Leiningen, probably Frankish nobles who came from the area of the upper Eckbach and whose coat of arms bore a lime tree. The castle was called the Leiningen, but is known today as Altleiningen Castle. Records of its occupation go back at least to the early 12th century - to Count Emich II (died before 1138). Not certain, but probable, is that his predecessor, Emich I, was also his father. Many communities, both locally and further afield, bearn the silver eagle of the Leiningens in their municipal coat of arms.

The most important lords in the area until the Early Modern Era, apart from the Leiningens, were the electors of the Palatinate and the prince-bishops of Worms. French troops caused great destruction under General Mélac during the War of the Palatine Succession (1689–1697). The Leiningerland was also heavily influenced by Bavarian rule of the Palatinate, which lasted from 1816 to the end of the Second World War.

== Sights ==
Altleiningen Castle "above" the eponymous village recalls the Leiningen lords, as does Neuleiningen Castle, 5 kilometres to the northeast in the centre of the village of the same name. Both castles have been partially restored. Today, Altleiningen Castle is home to a youth hostel, an open-air swimming pool in the old castle moat and the "professional amateur theatre" of the Altleiningen Castle Players (Burgspiele Altleiningen). The remains of other Leiningen castles are in Battenberg, where there was once a castle of the same name, and in Bockenheim where Emichsburg Castle stands.

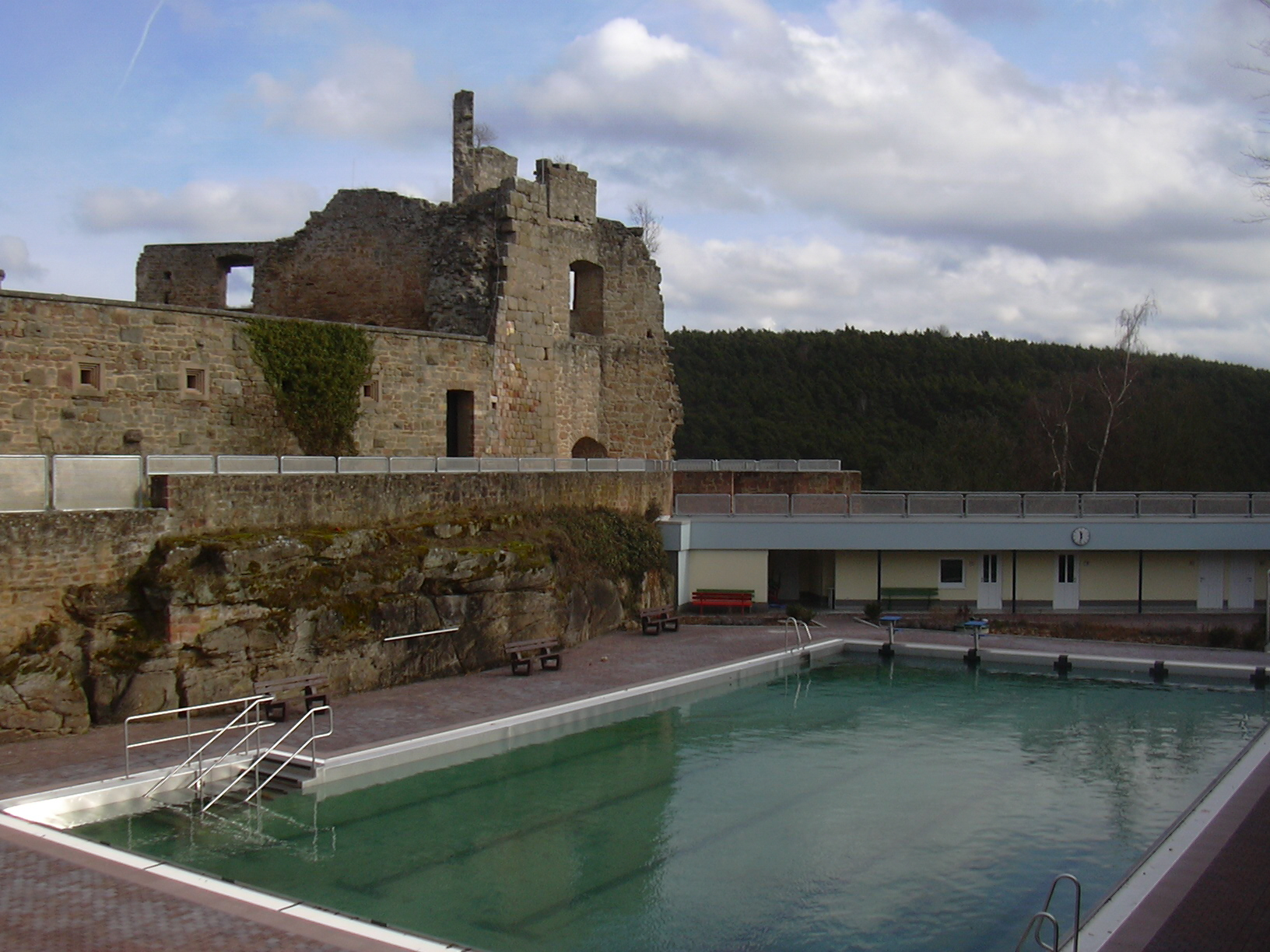
Altleiningen Castle

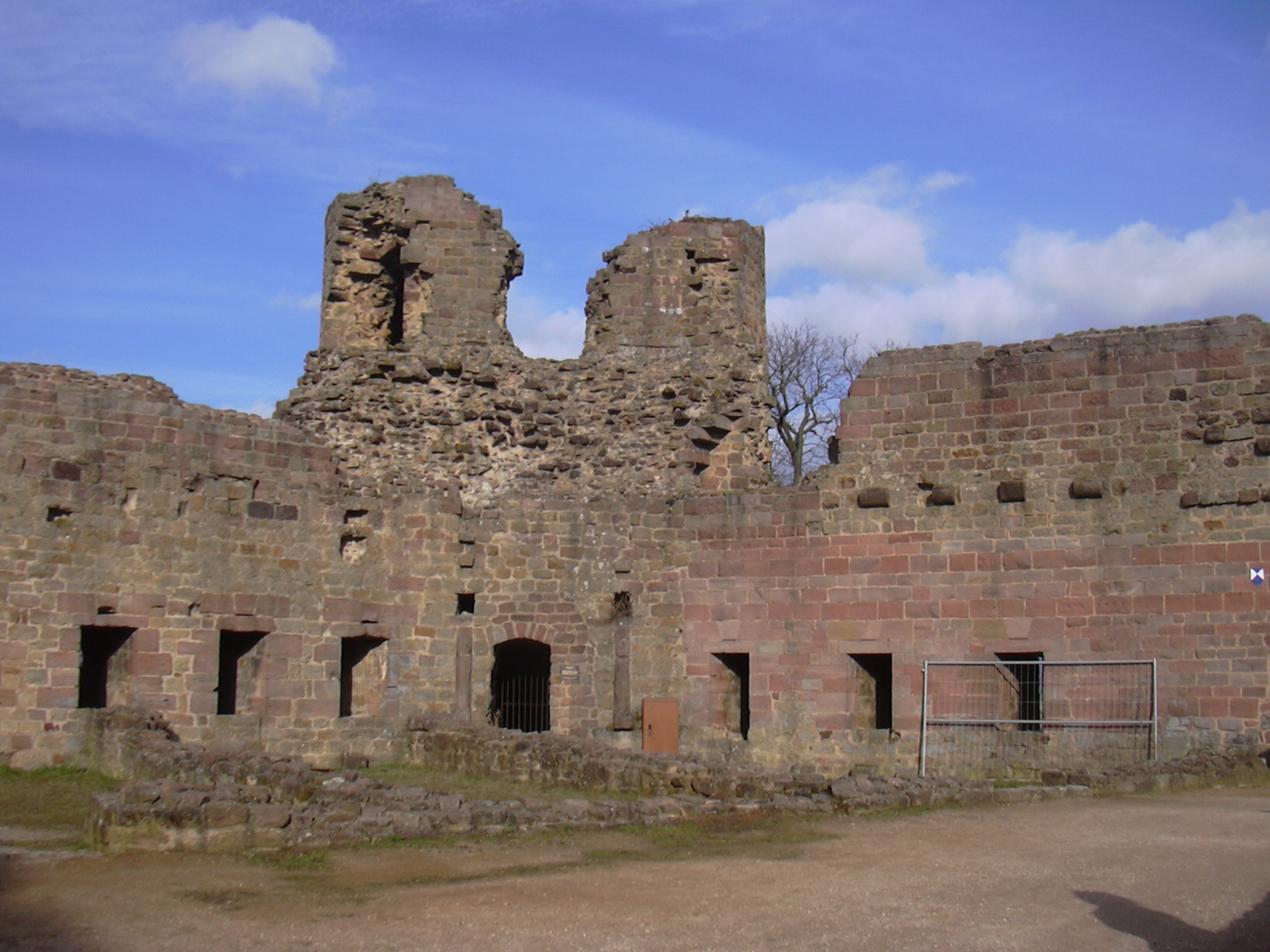
Neuleiningen Castle

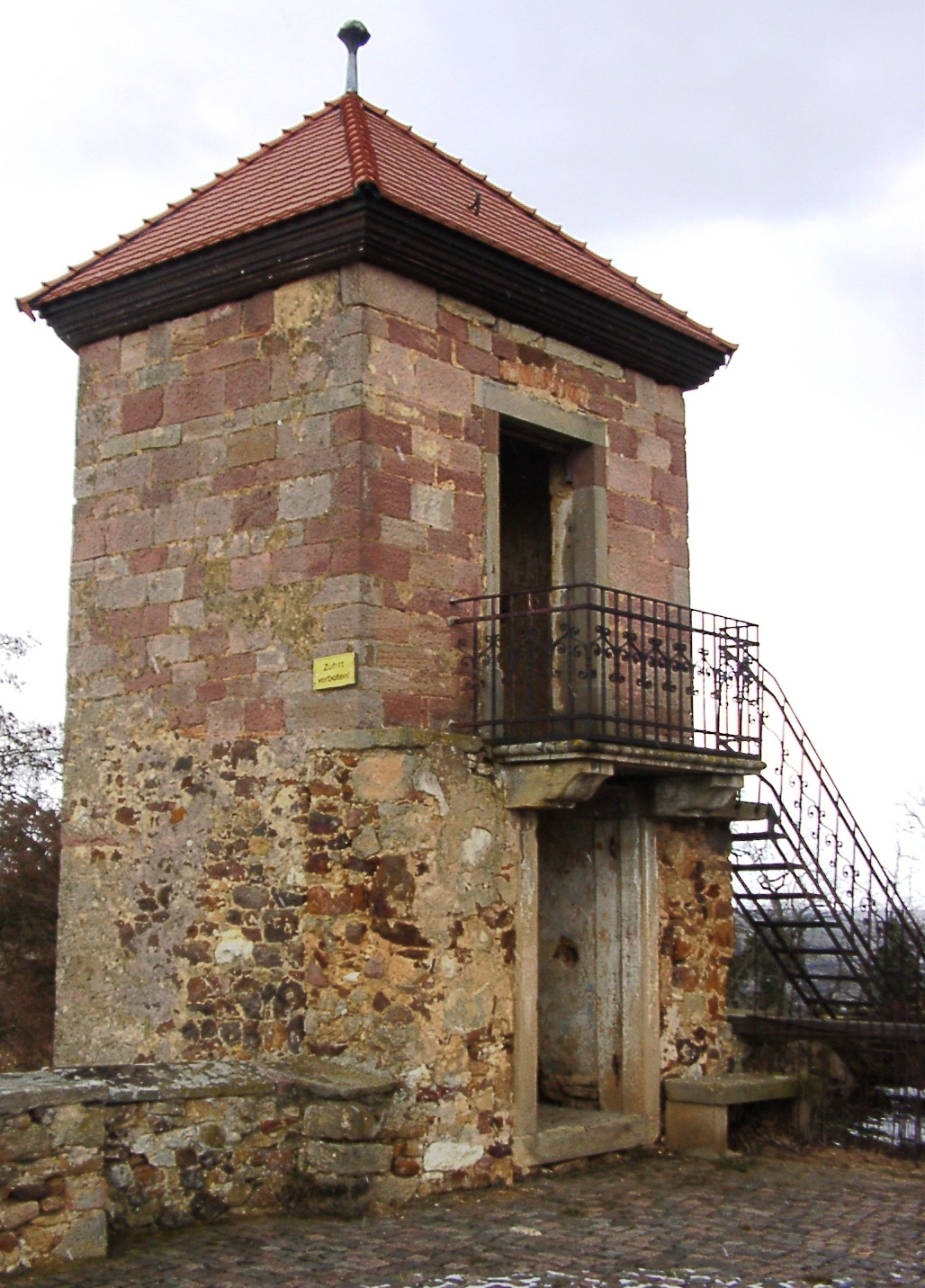
Battenberg Castle

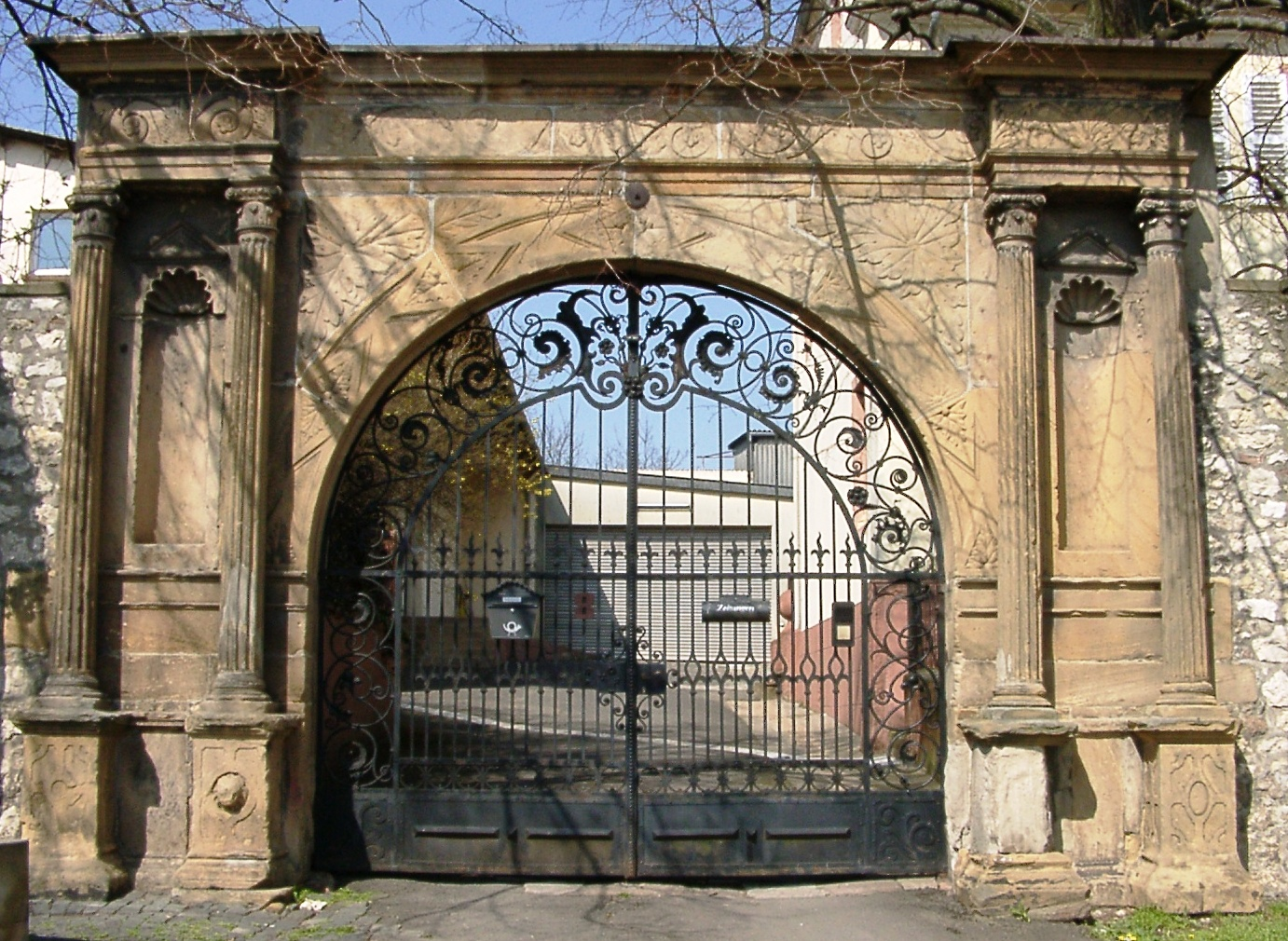
The Emichsburg

In the Altleiningen village of Höningen are various elements of the Augustinian canon church of St. Peter and the former Höningen Latin School as well as the Romanesque Church of St. James. Near Neuleiningen Castle lies the Alte Pfarrey ("Old Vicarage"), in which one of the leading restaurants in the Palatinate is housed.

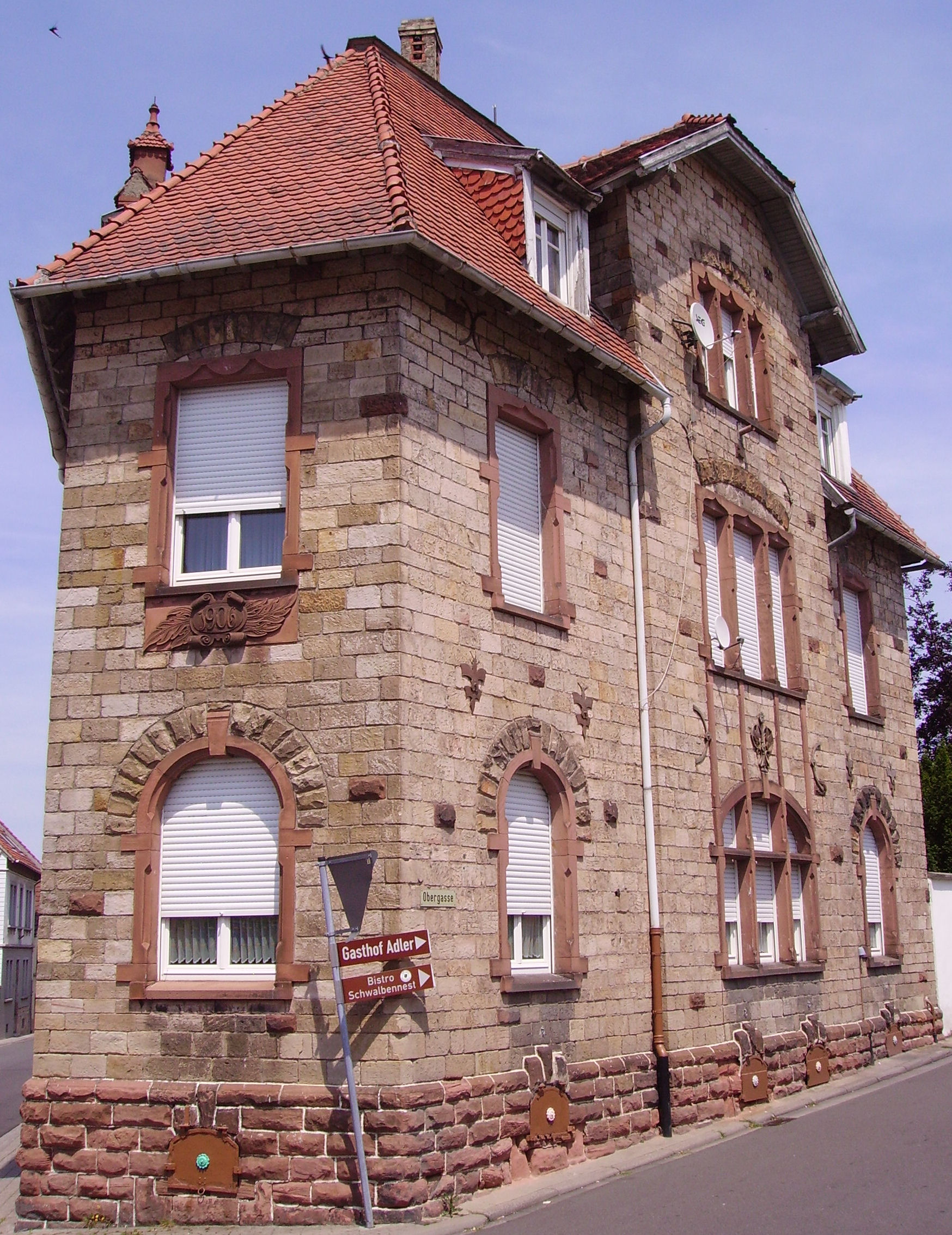
A Gründerzeit villa in Hettenleidelheim

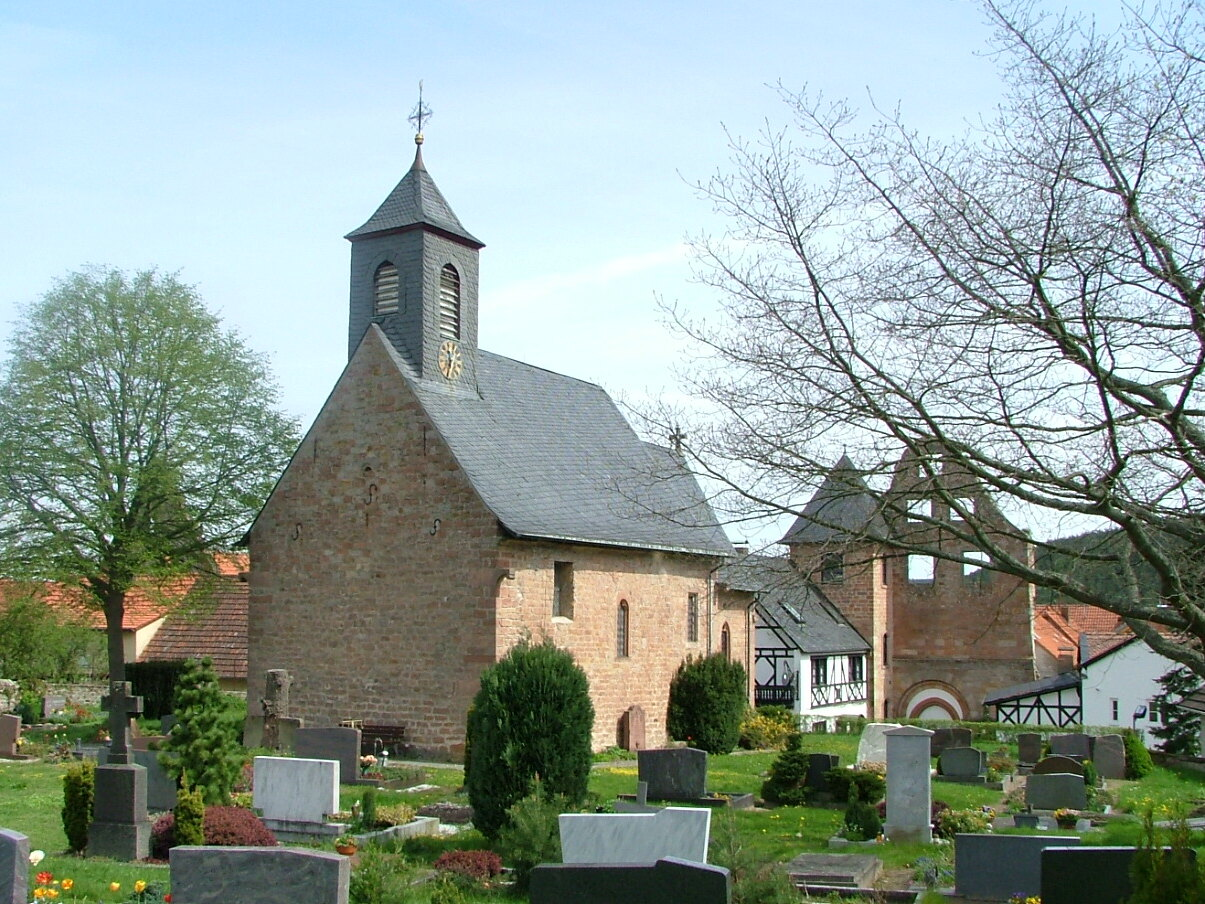
Romanesque Church of St. James in Höningen

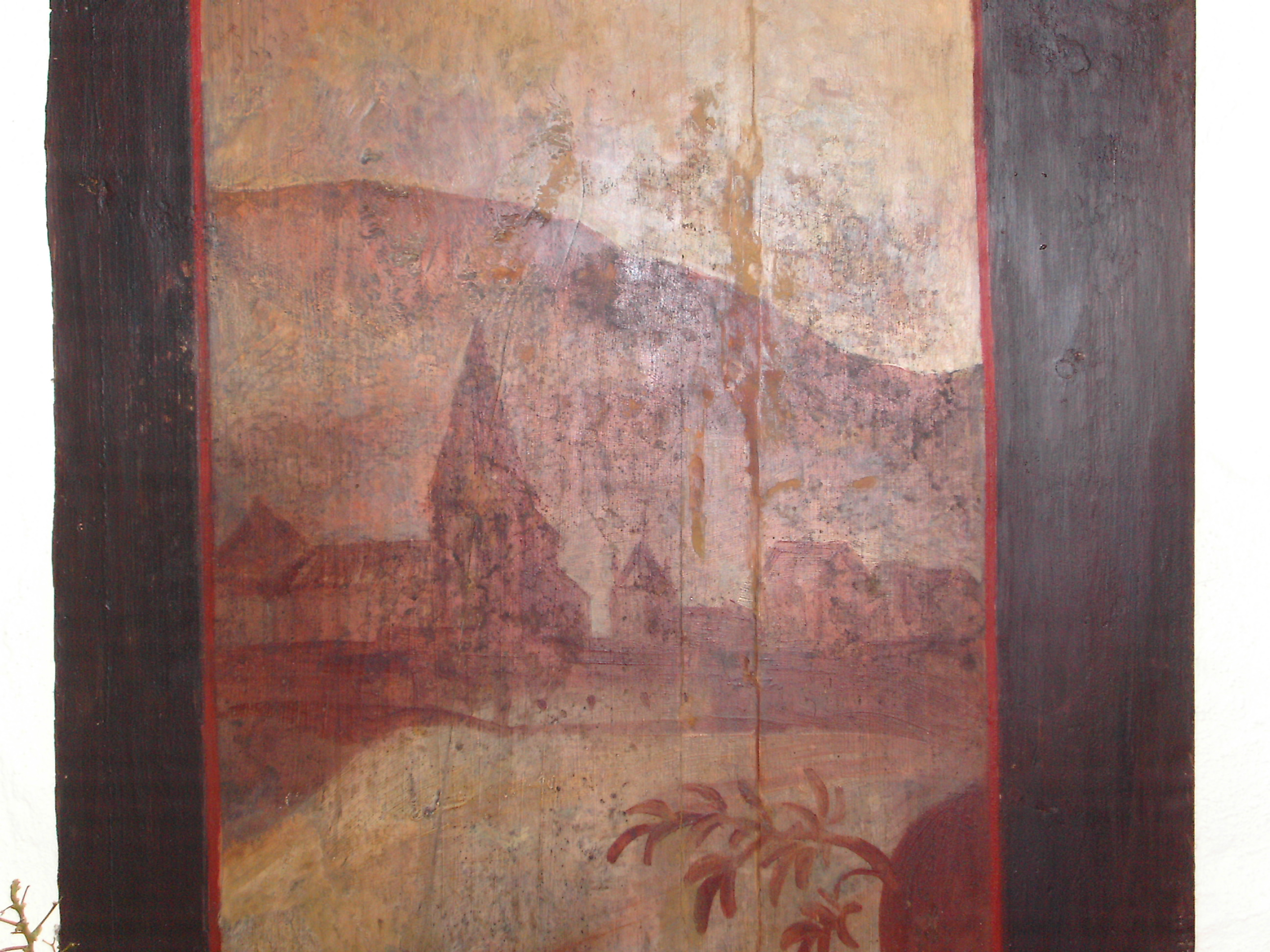
Grünstadt around 1680 (wood painting)

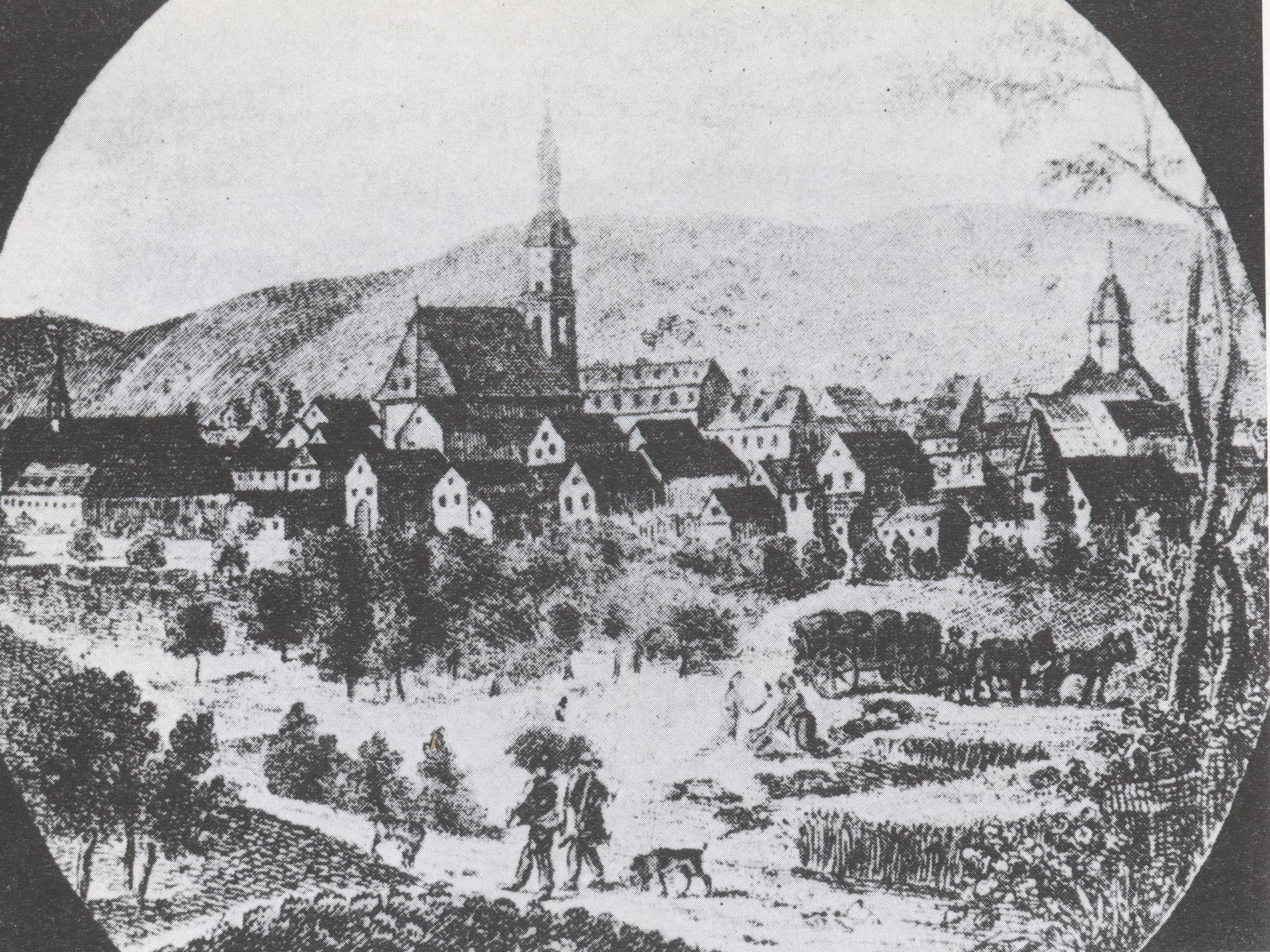
Grünstadt around 1800 (decorative plate)

St Lawrence's Church in Dirmstein is a fine example of baroque architecture. It was built from 1742 to 1746 by Franz Rothermel to modified plans from the famous church architect, Balthasar Neumann, as a simultaneum. Nearby, in the historic centre, are three restored palace-like manor houses: the Sturmfedersches Schloss, the Koeth-Wanscheidsches Schloss and the Quadtsches Schloss, as well as two English gardens in the schloss park and the cellar garden. The town of Grünstadt and the municipalities of Großkarlbach and Neuleiningen have picturesque centres with numerous timber-framed buildings.

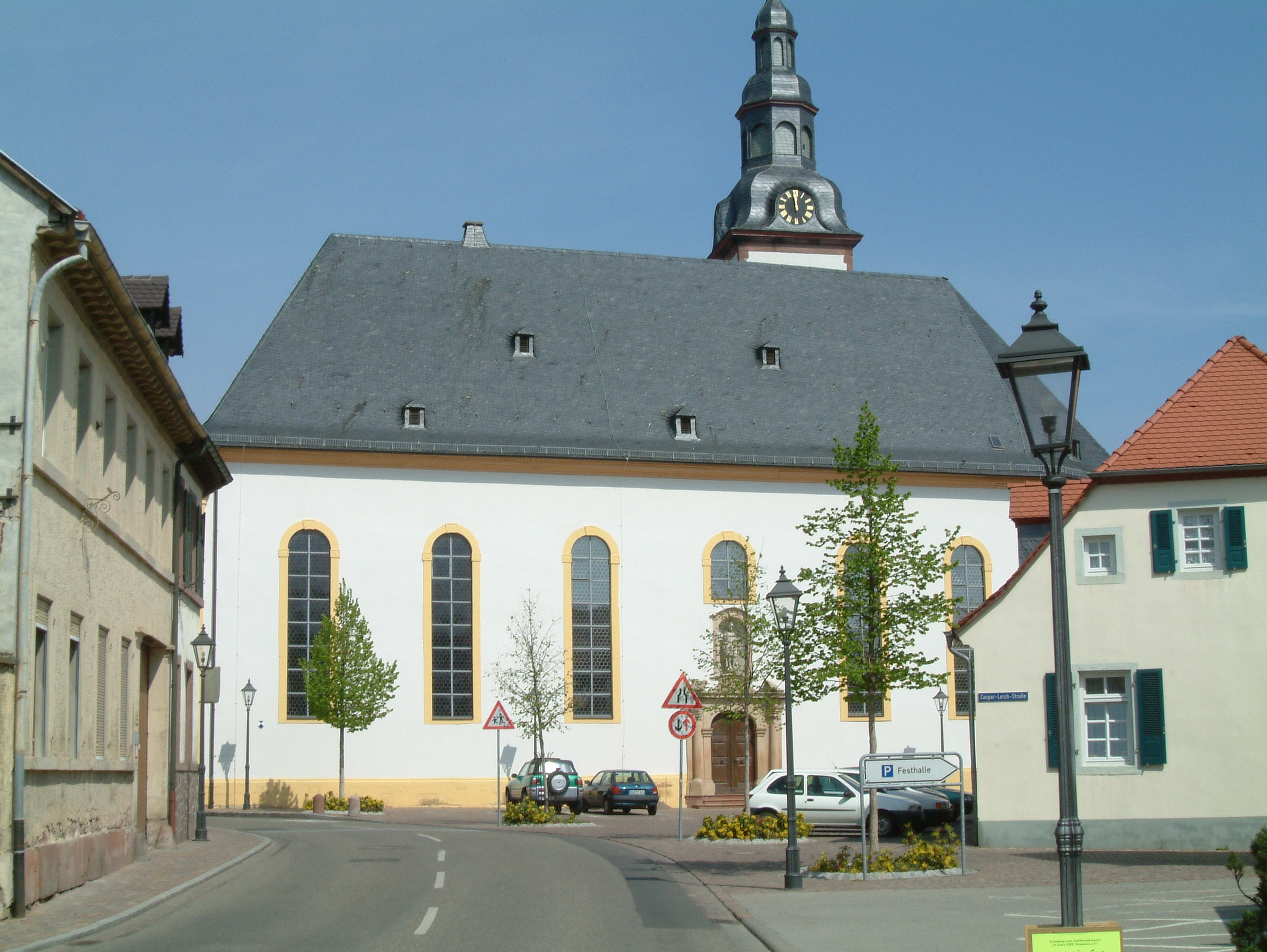
Dirmstein: St. Lawrence Church...

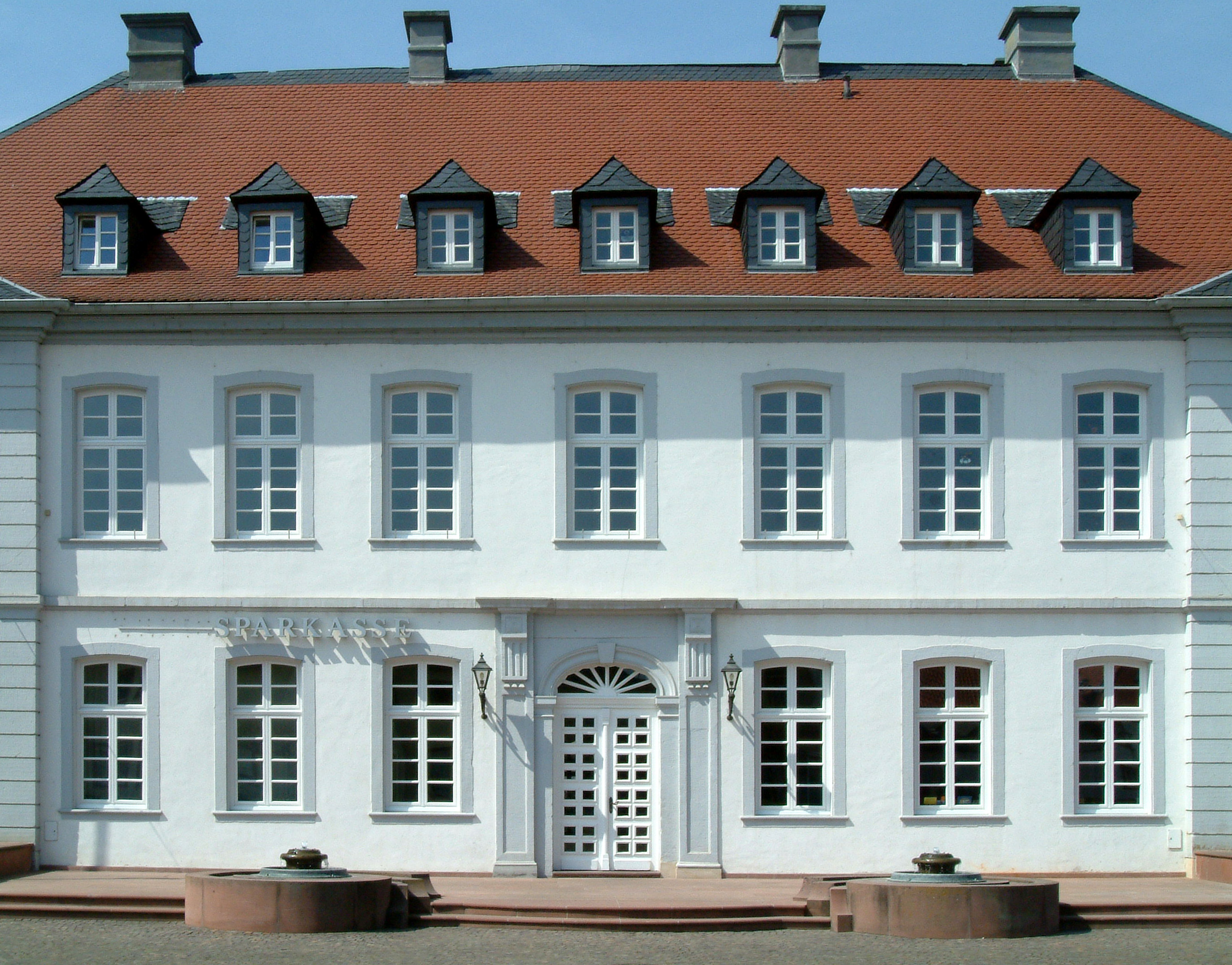
...Sturmfedersches Schloss

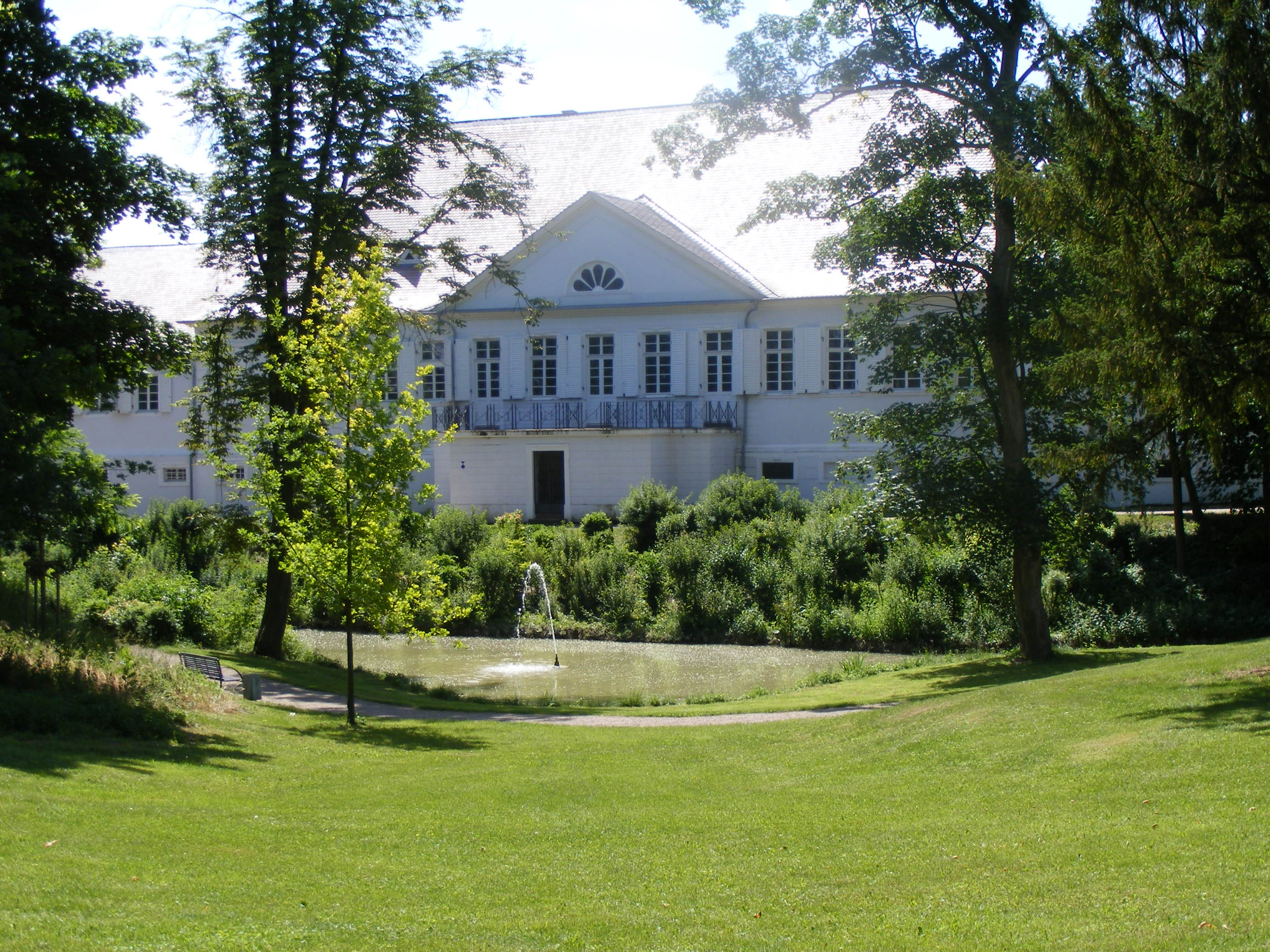
...Koeth-Wanscheidsches Schloss

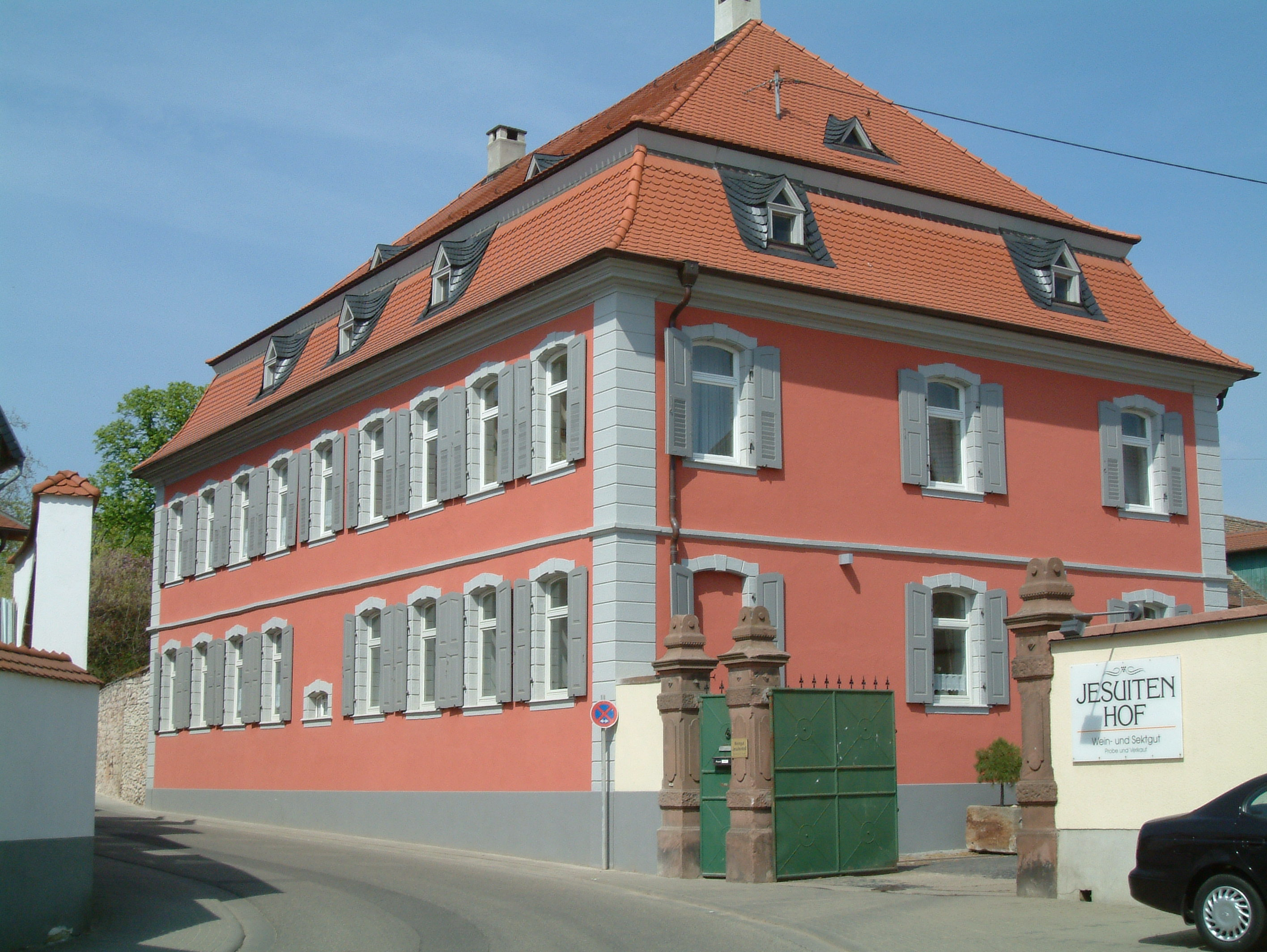
...Quadtsches Schloss

The Eckbach Mill Path, which was created in 1997 on the initiative of the Kleinkarlbach mill researcher, Wolfgang Niederhöfer, runs for 23 kilometres along the Eckbach stream and past 23 old water mills from southwest to northeast through the Leiningerland. In 2007 in the Großkarlbach village mill the Leiningerland Mill Museum (Mühlenmuseum Leiningerland) was opened. From a hydro-engineering perspective the 20-Pipe Well of Altleiningen is important; it is fed from a mine gallery which was driven deep into the rock around 1600 in order to supply the castle. Today, the well delivers most of the water for the Eckbach.

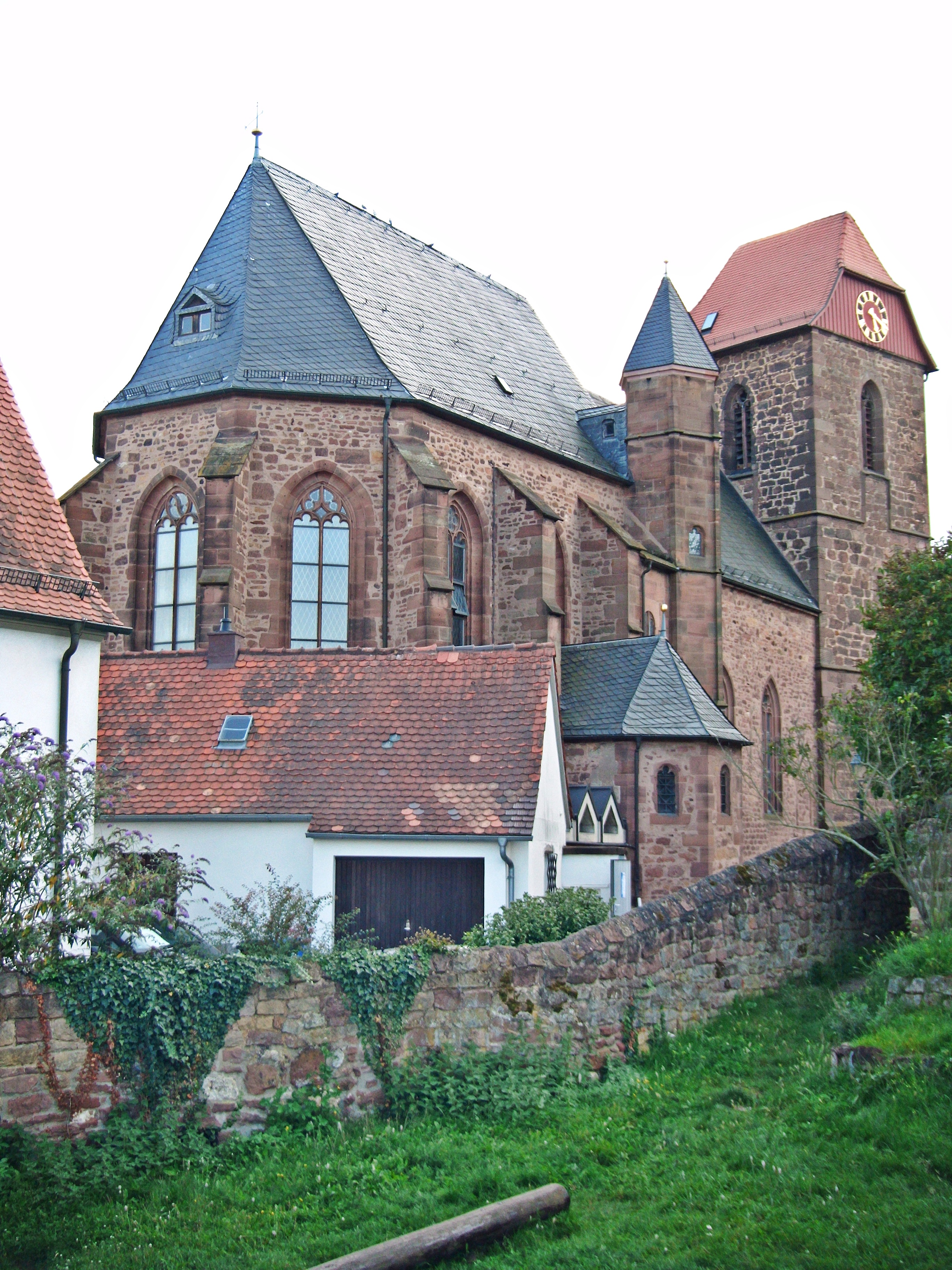
St.Nikolaus in Neuleiningen

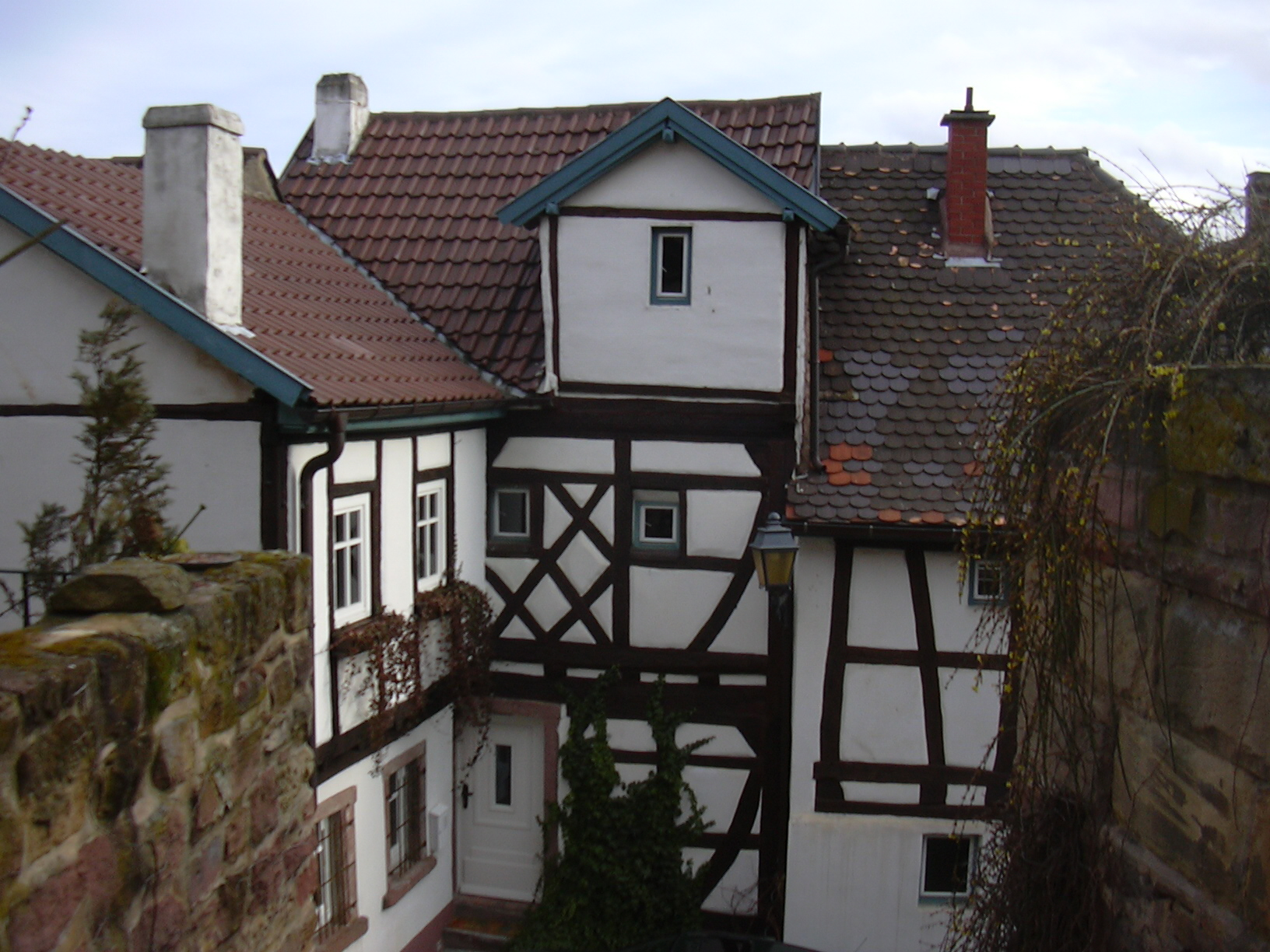
Timber-framed houses in Neuleiningen

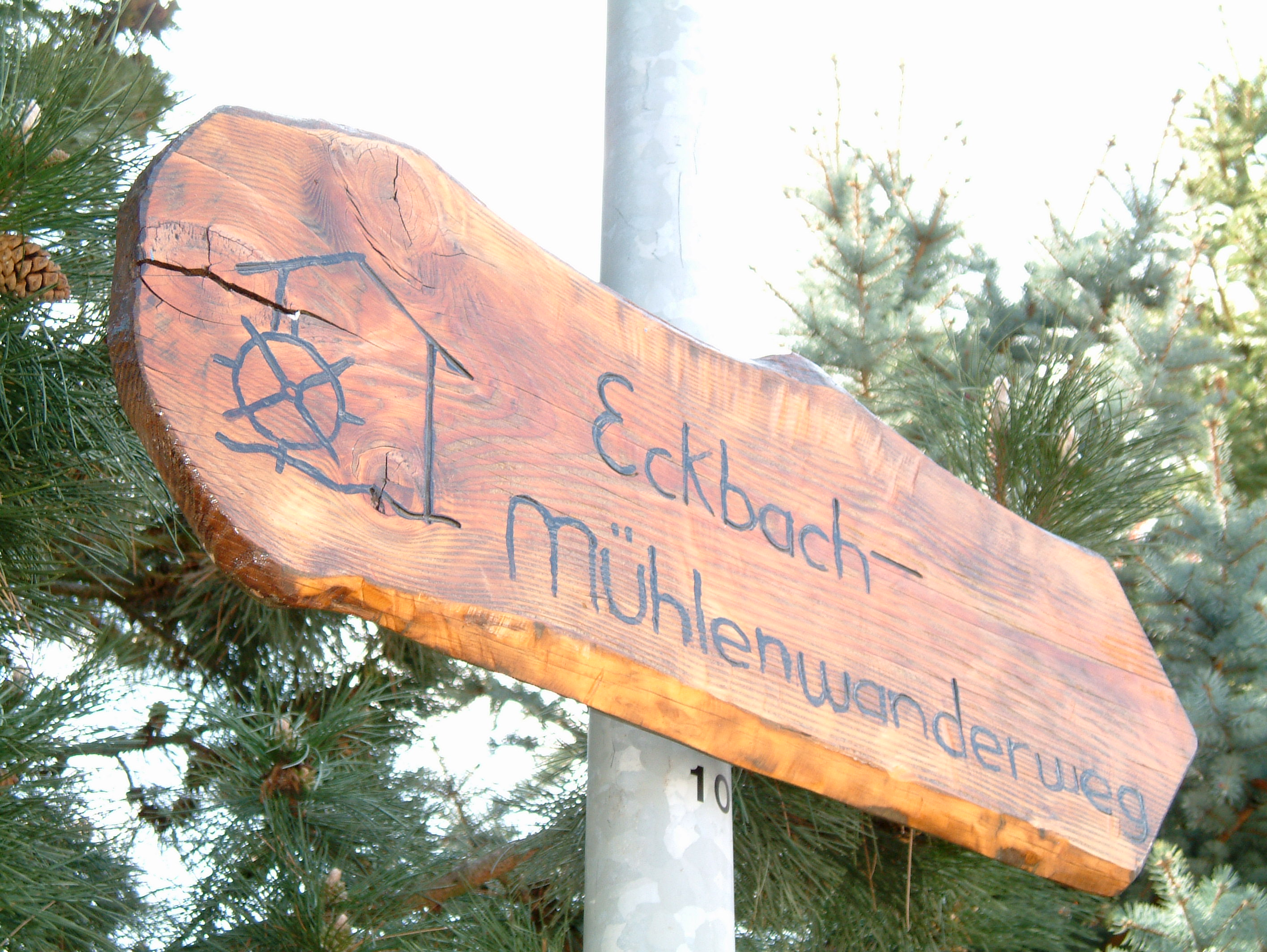
Eckbach Mill Path

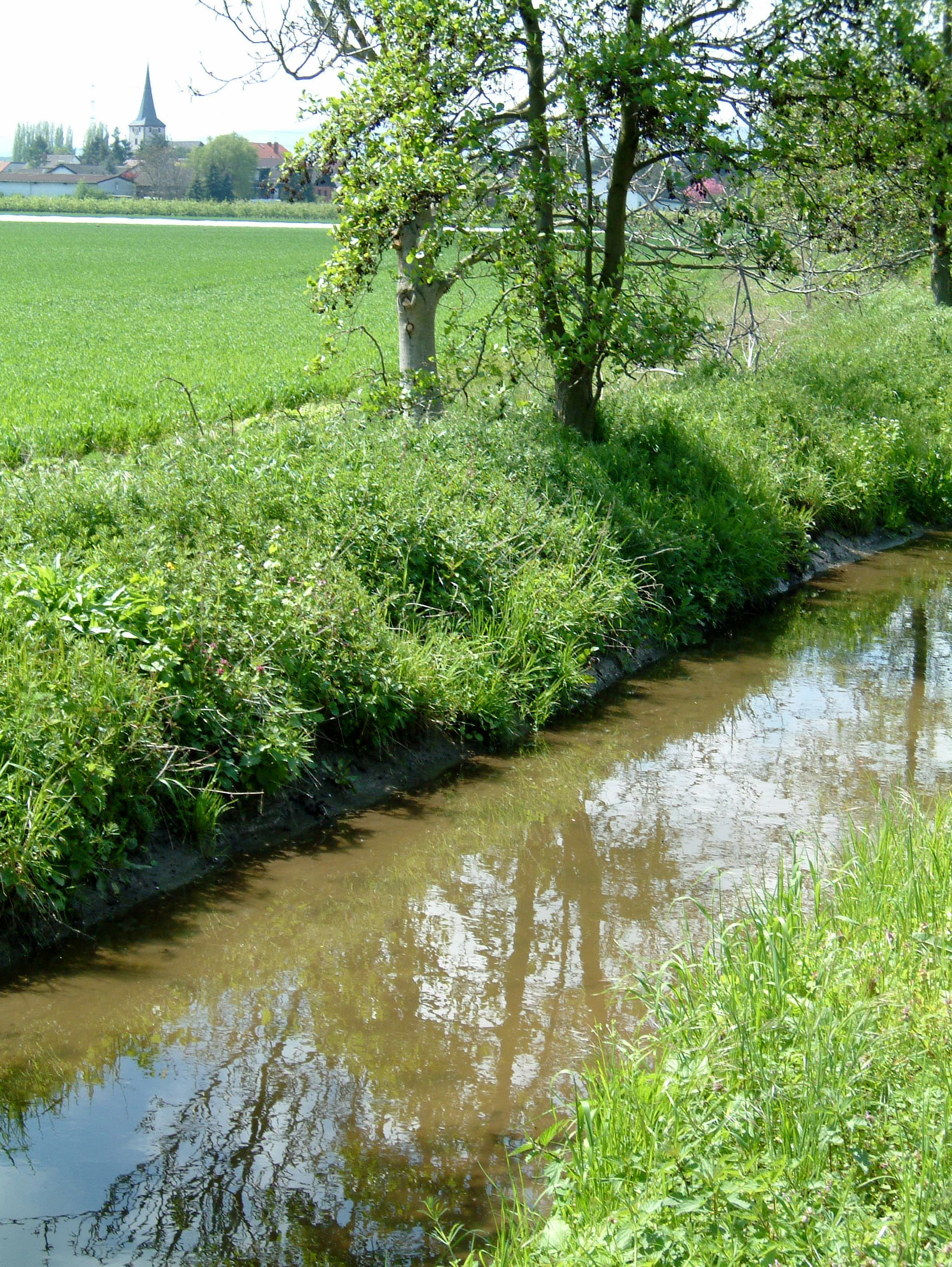
The Eckbach and the Laumersheim

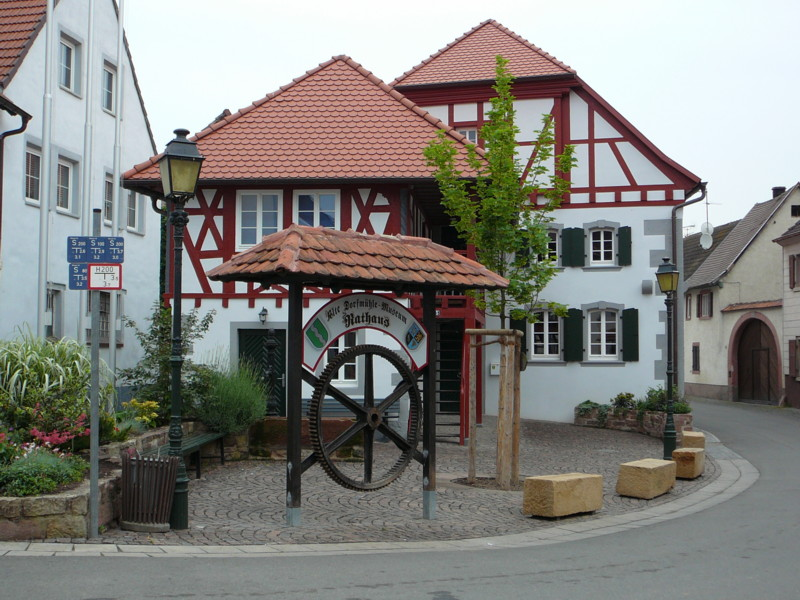
Großkarlbach village mill and mill museum

The upper reaches of the Eisbach and its valley, the Eistal, which is natural in places, also flow through the Leiningerland. Its main attractions are the 6 hectare reservoir of the Eiswoog, the bridges of the regional Eis Valley Railway, the local Stumpfwald Railway, which is a narrow gauge, heritage line that carries tourists through the forest, and, near Eisenberg, archaeological site of a Roman vicus and the protected landscape of Erdekaut. There are several old churches dating to Romanesque and Gothic periods, especially on the middle course of the Eisbach.

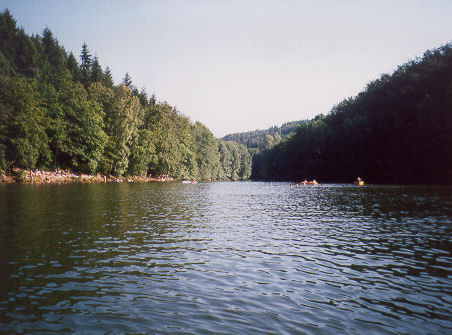
The Eiswoog in the Stumpfwald forest near Ramsen

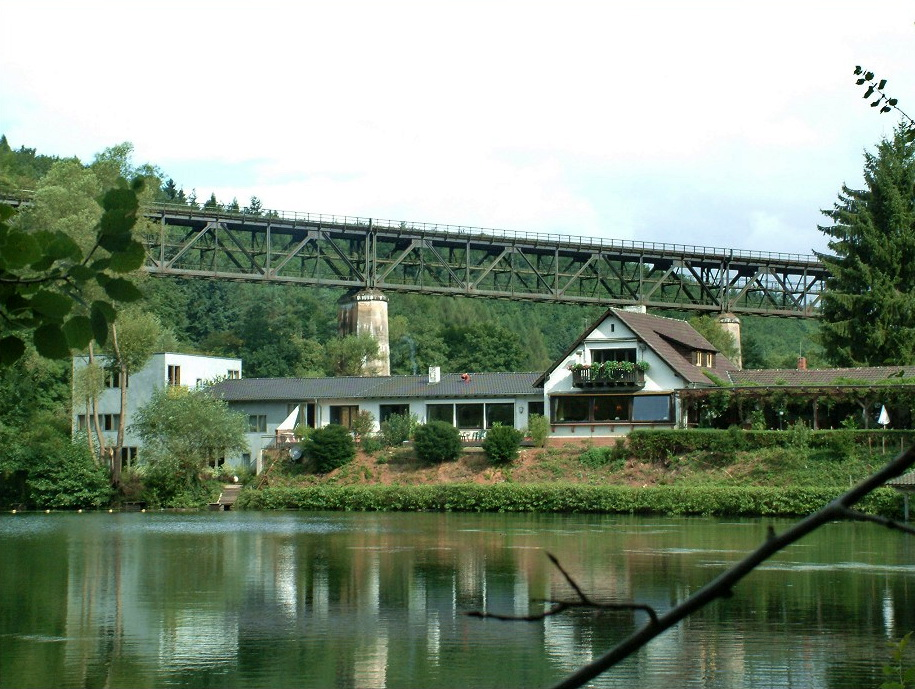
The Eis Valley Viaduct on the Eis Valley Railway

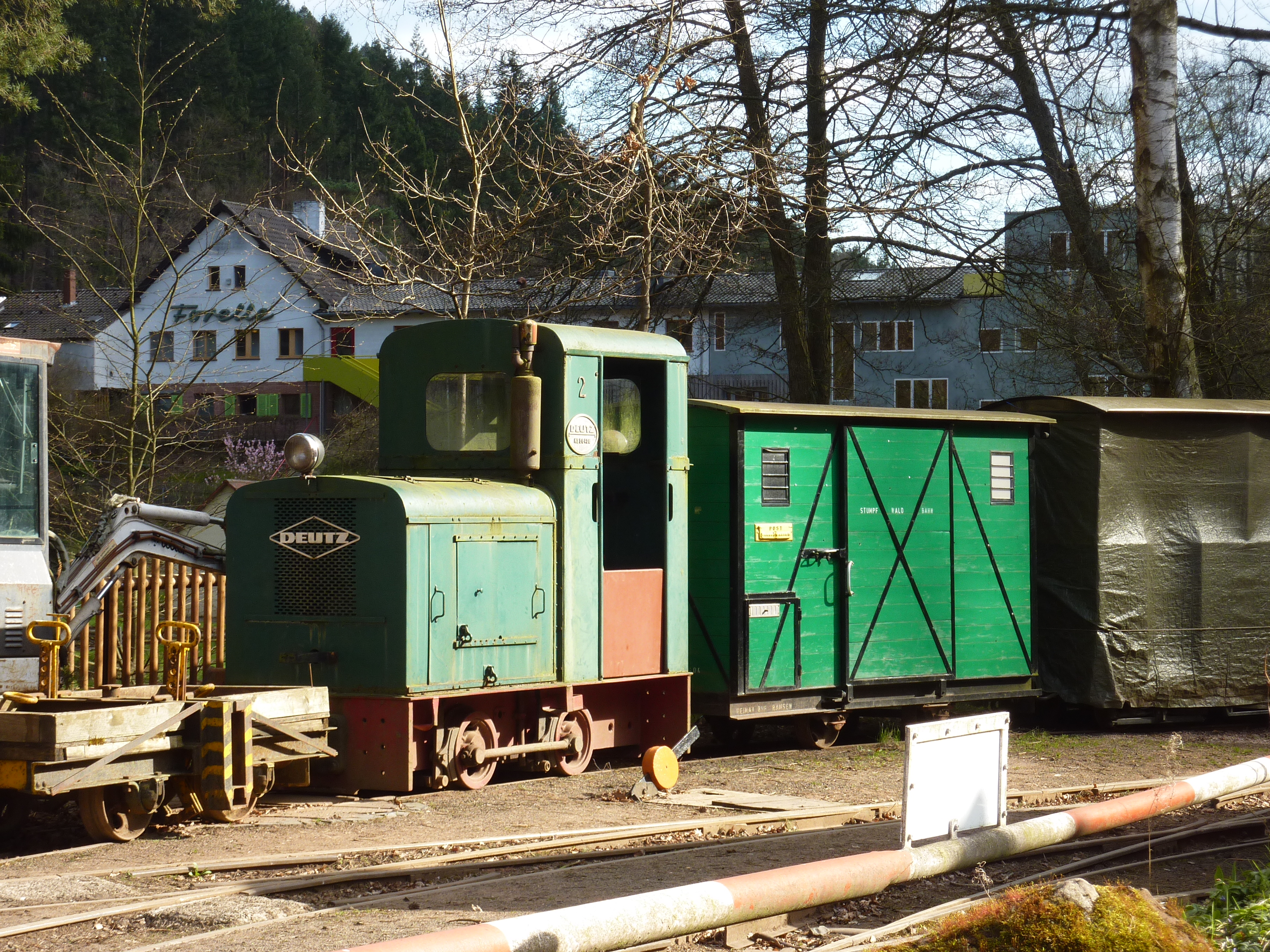
Train on the Stumpfwald Railway

In addition to the mill museum in Großkarlbach there are also the Hettenleidelheim Local History Museum (Heimatmuseum Hettenleidelheim, clay mining), the Quirnheim Museum of Technology (Technikmuseum Quirnheim, bicycles), the museum in the castle tower at Neuleiningen (castle history, stoneware manufacturing, gallery of local artist, Simon Conradi) and the museum in the Old Town Hall (Altes Rathaus) at Grünstadt (Counts of Leiningen, stoneware manufacture, brewing, paintings by Johann Adam Schlesinger).

== Events ==
The Leiningerland is heavily dependent on viticulture; its vineyards being part of the Palatinate wine region. During the warmer months, a festival takes place almost every weekend somewhere - be it a fair, kermesse or wine festival. The best known nationally is probably the Kändelgassenfest in Großkarlbach. Every year, the Wine Countess of the Leiningerland is selected, who then represents the region at events and festivals in the next twelve months. One of the wine countesses, Sylvia Benzinger, later also became the Palatine Wine Queen and German Wine Queen.

Every year in early October - usually on German Unity Day - the "Car-Free Eis Valley Day of Action" attracts many visitors to the region. The L 395 road, which runs from Asselheim through the Eise valley to Enkenbach, is closed to motor vehicles for the whole of one Sunday and the valley is open exclusively to pedestrians, usually hikers, and to cyclists.

Every October since 1953 there has been a Palatine language poetry competition at Bockenheim. The Kirchheim Winter Concert was established in 1990 and takes place in St Andrew's Church in Kirchheim. Its founder and artistic director is the bass-baritone and International Bach Prizewinner, Dominik Wörner. The focus of the concert series is on early music.

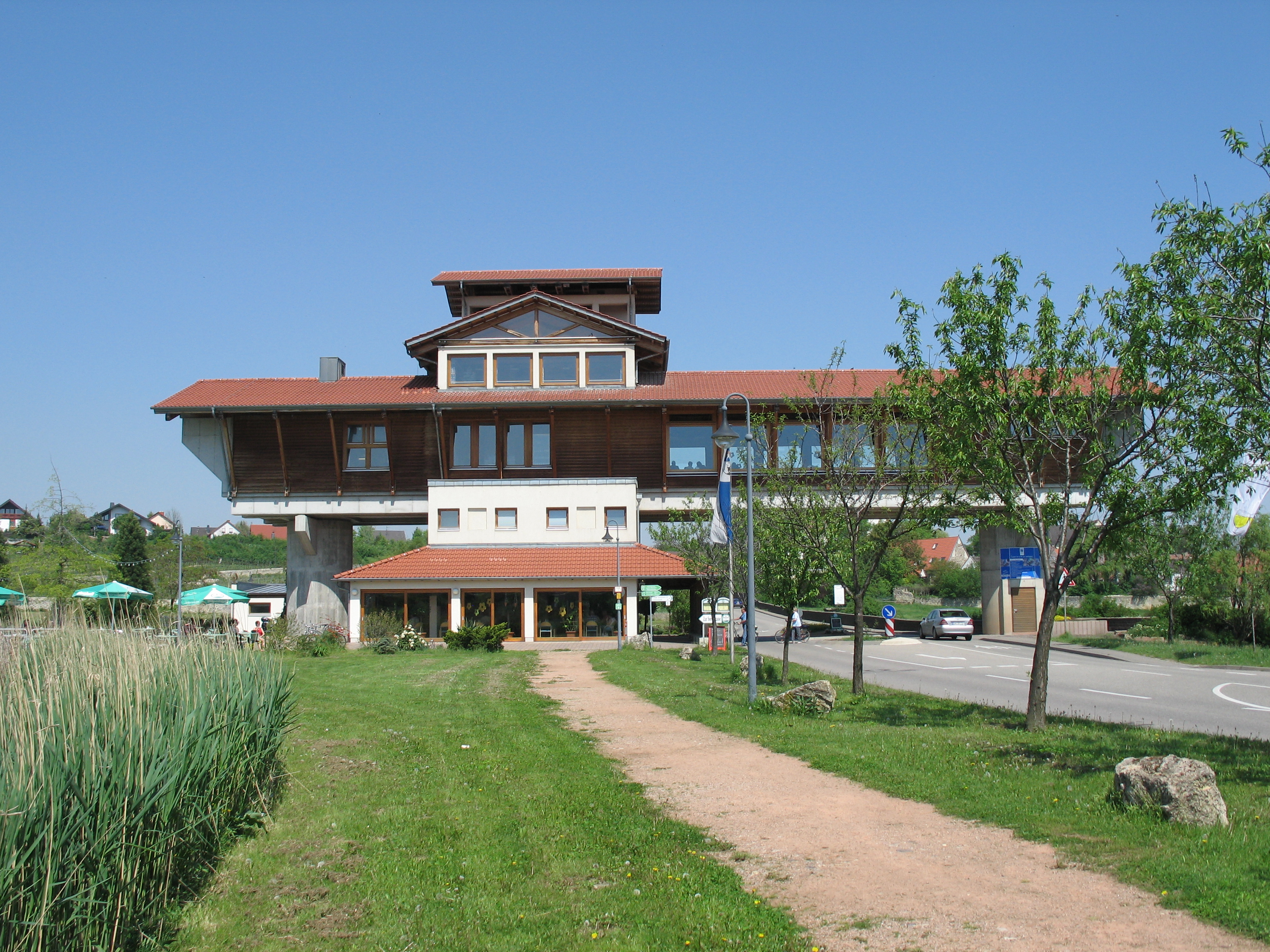
Haus der Deutschen Weinstraße in Bockenheim

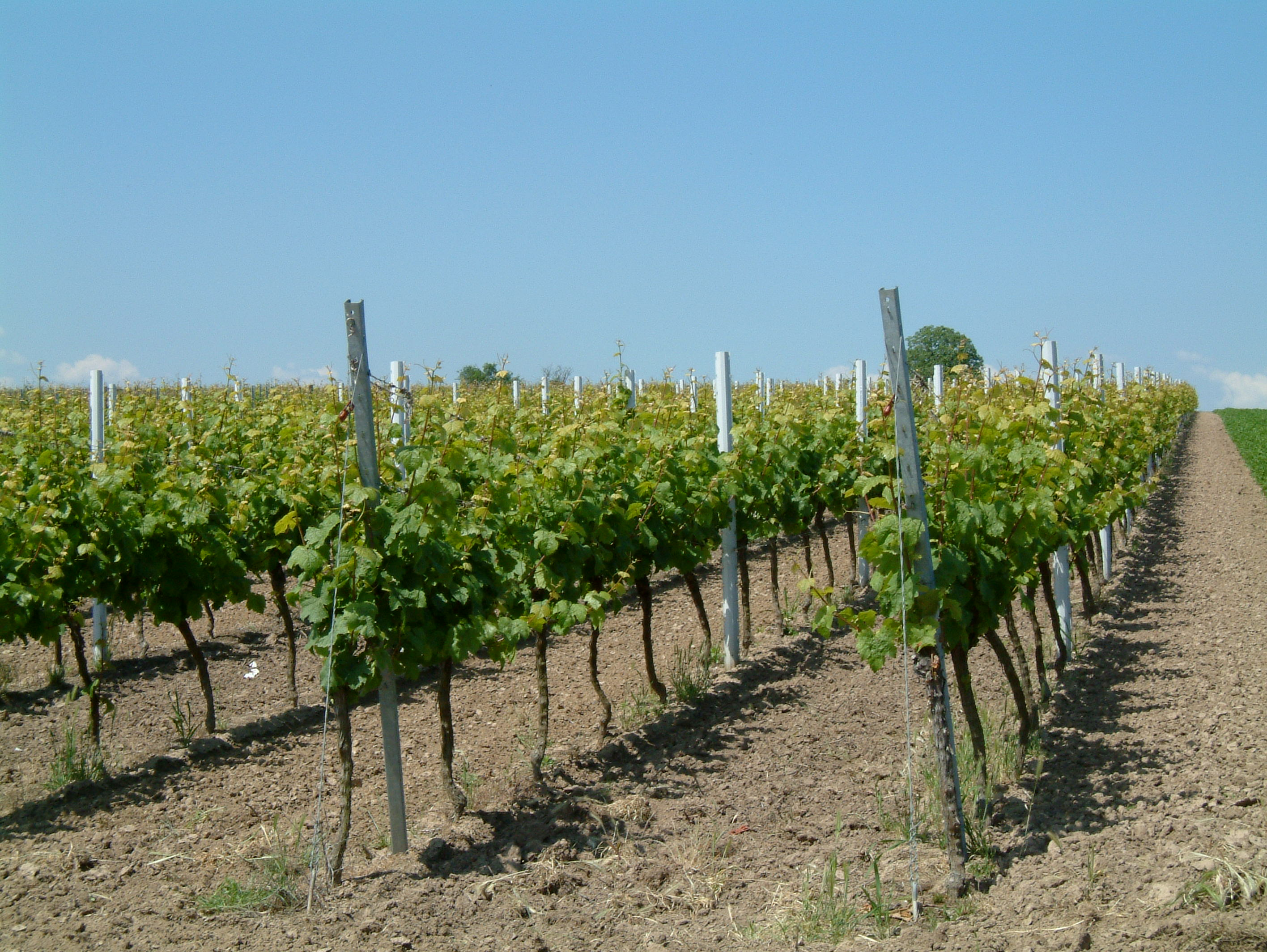
Riesling vineyard near Dirmstein

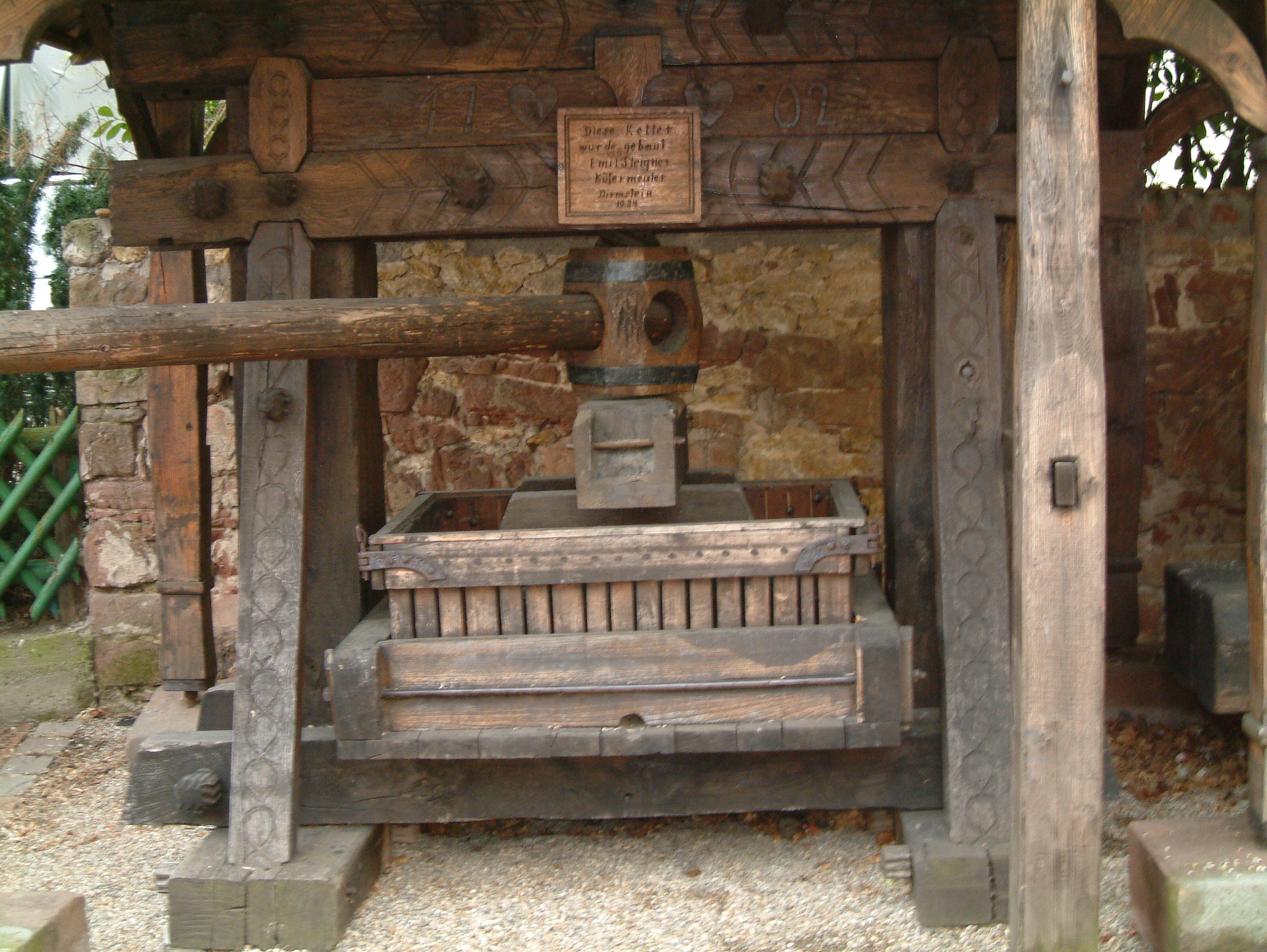
Celtic replica by master cooper, Emil Steigner

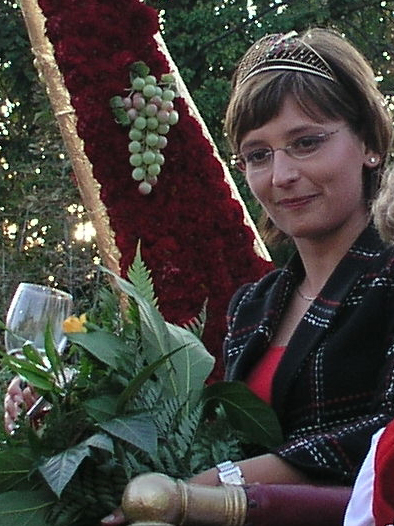
German Wine Queen, Sylvia Benzinger (2005)
