= Wine gate =

Wine gate may refer to:

- The German Wine Gate, a stone gate marking the southern end of the German Wine Route in Schweigen-Rechtenbach
- The Puerta del Vino (literally "Wine Gate"), an entrance gate in the Alhambra in Spain
  - La Puerta del Vino (The Wine Gate), one of Debussy's Preludes named for the Alhambra gate
- The Porta del Vino (lit. "Wine Gate"), a gate inside Bolzano's cathedral in Italy
- "Winegate", any of several scandals involving wine, especially the adulteration of wine; the "-gate" suffix derives from the American Watergate scandal
