= Haus der Deutschen Weinstraße =

Coordinates: 49.6092°N 8.1814°E

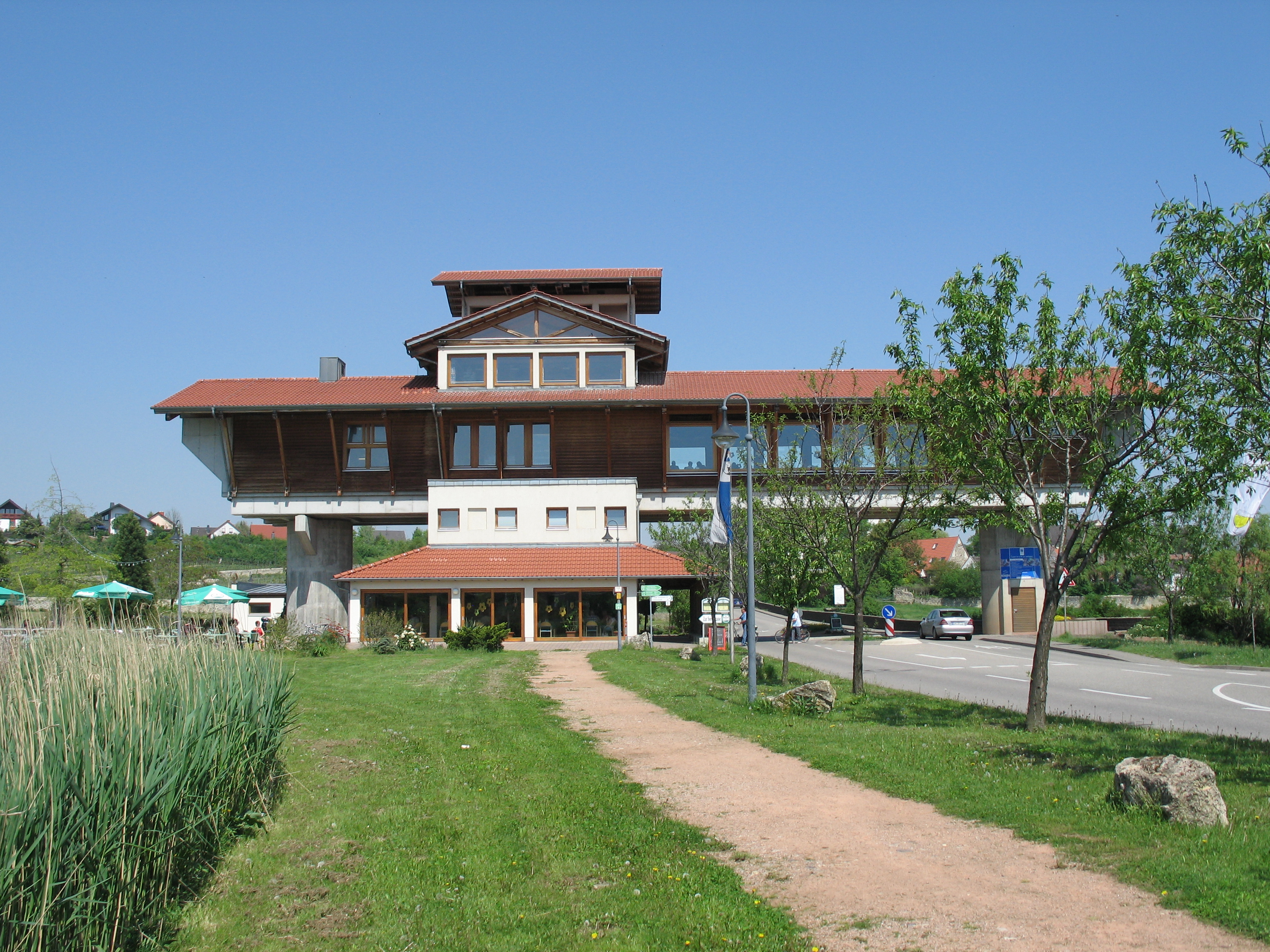
House of the German Wine Route from the south showing the section built over the road on the right of the building, the covered lakeside terrace at the front, and the "Tower Room" for "Wine Route Wedding Celebrations" (and, presumably, other functions).

The Haus der Deutschen Weinstraße ("House of the German Wine Route") has since 1995 marked the northern end of the German Wine Route at Bockenheim. In this respect it is a belated balancing feature for the German Wine Gate, 85 kilometers (53 miles) to the south which has marked the southern end of the German Wine Route at Schweigen since 1936.

Apart from its unusual architecture and its position at the end of the German Wine Route, its most obvious feature is a large restaurant, much of which is built out over the road that previously divided Großbockenheim from Kleinbockenheim.

== Geography ==
The Haus der Deutschen Weinstraße was built between Großbockenheim and Kleinbockenheim, two municipalities which were administratively independent until 1956 when they were officially merged as part of a local government boundary reform. The eastern wing of the building is in effect a bridge over Bundesstraße 271 (Local Road 271).

The Haus der Deutschen Weinstraße is positioned very close to several social and cultural amenities including the Bockenheim show ground, a sports ground and a community centre.

== The Building ==
The building's architecture incorporates conscious echoes of a Roman castra (fortification). The visible parts of it are predominantly of timber construction, and the supporting entablature is partially exposed.

In addition to a 120 seat restaurant, the building has several meeting rooms available. A showpiece is the Turmzimmer ("Tower Room") at the top which offers views over the local vineyards and towards the Haardt Mountains beyond. The restaurant opens on to a terrace which is set by the side of a lake which has been created on the site of a pond/wetland area.
