= German Wine Gate =

Building in Schweigen, Germany

Coordinates: 49°03′08″N 7°57′23″E

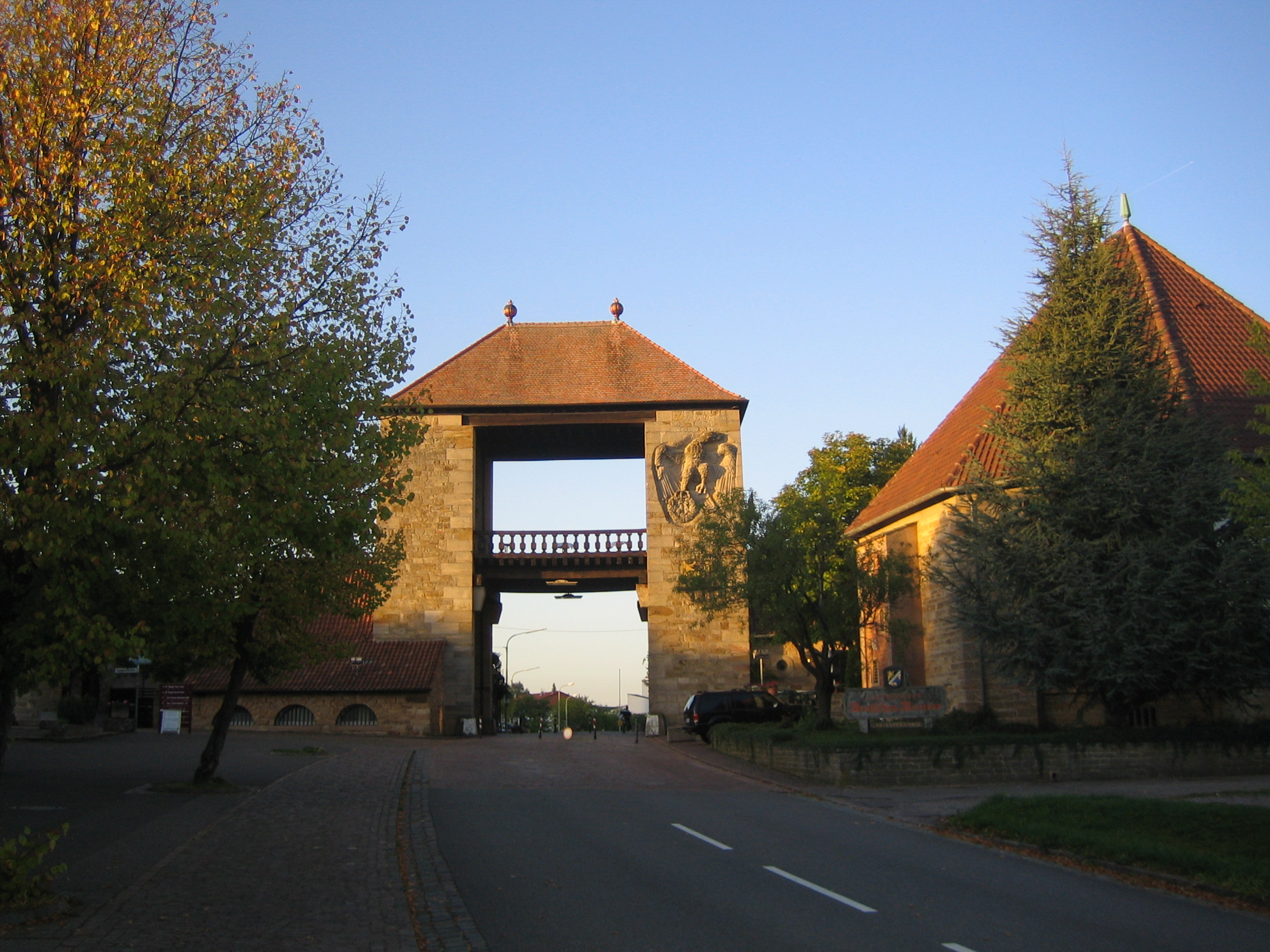
German Wine Gate in 2006

The German Wine Gate (Deutsches Weintor) is a gate-like structure which marks the southern end of the German Wine Route in Schweigen-Rechtenbach.

A corresponding marker at the northern end of the German Wine Route at Bockenheim, some 85 kilometers (53 miles) to the north is the Haus der Deutschen Weinstraße (House of the German Wine street) which since 1995 has welcomed visitors with unusual architectural details and a large restaurant.

== Geography ==
The "Weintor" spans the little road leading out of Schweigen on its northern edge. When constructed it spanned the local road Bundesstraße 38, but now the passage under it is blocked by bollards. Pedestrians and cyclists can negotiate the bollards but for cars a new road has been built approximately fifty meters to the east of the entire structure. The road to the north follows the German Wine Route towards Bad Bergzabern and Landau. A few hundred meters to the south is the French frontier after which the road enters Wissembourg.

== Structure ==
The 18-meter-high (59 ft) "Weintor" is built in the neo-classical style which was favoured in Germany in the 1930s. Although much of the structure is of timber, the outer facing is constructed of the pink sandstone similar to that used for several traditionally styled showpiece buildings in the area, such as Trifels Castle. The site includes a restaurant operated by the local wine growers' association, as well as a "Weinlehrpfad" (wine education path), three kilometers long and, when opened in 1969, the first of its kind in the country.

== History ==
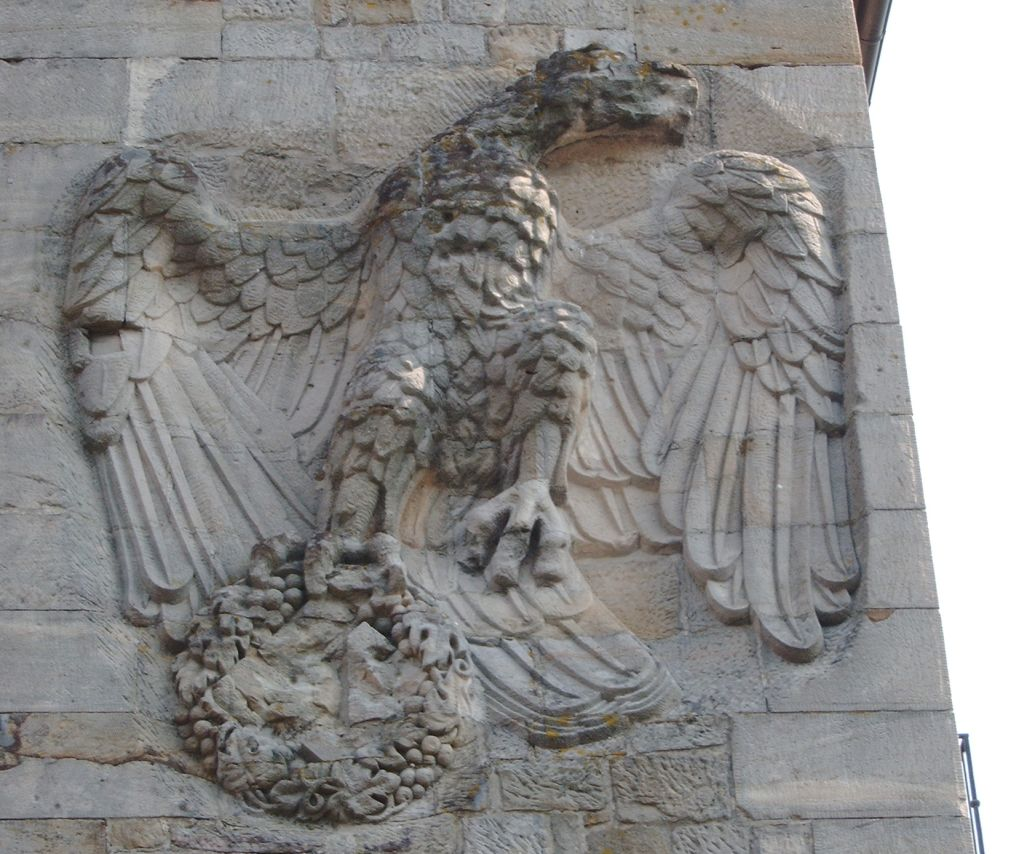
After the war the two headed eagle which had proudly decorated the "Weintor" when viewed from France, across the frontier, had its swastika cut away along with one of its two heads.

The "Weintor" was created as part of an economic initiative by the National Socialist government in the 1930s. The government took a far more interventionist approach to economic policy than had, till that time, been considered "normal". The wine industry in the Palatinate wine region was in crisis. A wine harvest more than twice as large as usual had caused prices to crash by 1934. Government policy had compounded the industry's difficulties by forbidding the business activities of Jewish wine traders, who had hitherto provided a vital commercial link for the wineries Party leaders came up with the idea of the German Wine Route, with the imposing "Weintor" at its southern end, as a way to increase general awareness of the region's wineries and to boost employment in the tourism sector locally.

The regional Gauleiter, Josef Bürckel, produced an appropriately bombastic speech on 19 October 1935 as part of the official opening of the German Wine Route. His speech was entitled "Kampf und Volk – Wein und Wahrheit“. The "Weintor" was clearly visible from across the frontier, and the Gauleiter's speech contrasted the activist policy of the national government with the economic turmoil in nearby France, then experiencing, nationally, a particularly savage and destructive bout of industrial unrest and economic gloom. Press reports of the opening ceremony wrote of it as a form of "Weihe" (consecration). At this time the Weintor in Schweigen was a provisional timber structure. At Grünstadt, near the northern end of the "Wine Route" a second "Weintor", this one of Papier-mâché, had been erected. As part of the ceremony a column of 300 vehicles drove the length of the German Wine Route in convoy, from south to north, but not before a single engined airplane had flown its entire length.

Der Wein ist wahr – das Gelöbnis echt: Hier stehen Deutsche und nichts als Deutsche – im Westen die Feldwache der Nation.

The wine is true. The vow is true. Here stand Germans and only Germans, in the nation's western look-out post.

- Gauleiter Josef Bürckel at the central opening ceremony in Bad Dürkheim on 19 October 1935

The stone-clad "Weintor" was finally built only in 1936. An architectural competition for its design was won by August Josef Peter and Karl Mittel from Landau. The foundation stone was laid on 27 August 1936, and less than two months later, on 18 October, completion was celebrated. Citizens of Wissembourg, which since 1919 had been part of France, enjoyed a fine view, if they chose to lift their eyes to the hill on north side of their town, of a large two headed imperial eagle carved on one side of the "Weintor", clutching a huge swastika in its talons. In France this was seen as provocative.

After the war ended, in 1945, the huge stone swastika was cut away.
