= German Wine Route =

Oldest German tourist wine route

German Wine Route
- Deutsche Weinstraße
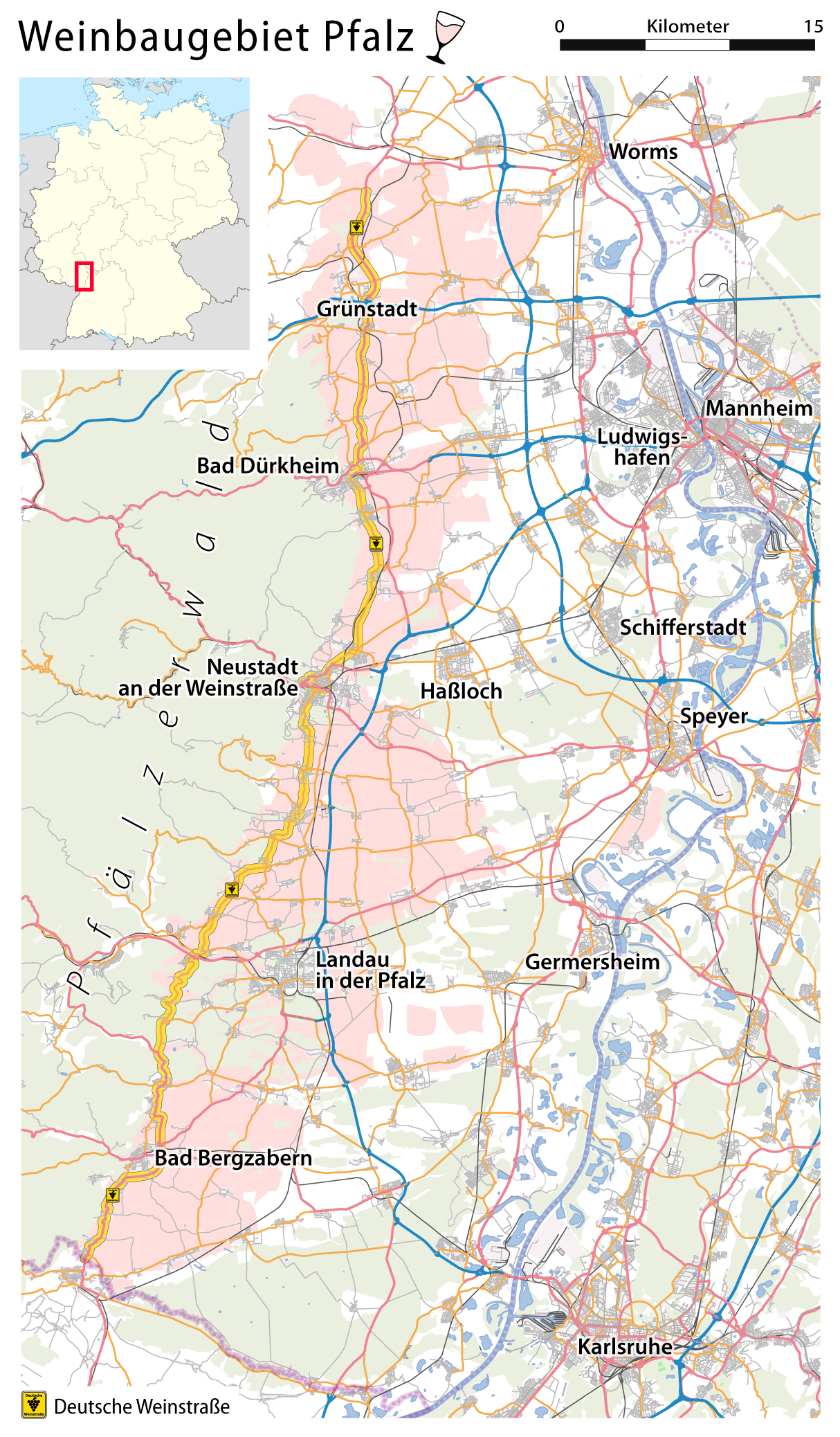
- The German Wine Route (yellow) runs through the Palatinate wine region (red)

Route information
- Length: 85 km (53 mi) (approx)
- Existed: 1935–present
- Component highways: B 271

Major junctions
- South end: Schweigen-Rechtenbach; (German Wine Gate)
- North end: Bockenheim an der Weinstraße; (Haus der Deutschen Weinstraße)

Location
- Country: Germany
- States: Rhineland-Palatinate

Highway system
- Roads in Germany; Autobahns; List; Federal; List; State; E-roads

The German Wine Route or Wine Road (German: Deutsche Weinstraße, pronounced [ˌdɔʏtʃə ˈvaɪnˌʃtʁaːsə]) is the oldest of Germany's tourist wine routes. Located in the Palatinate region of the federal state of Rhineland-Palatinate, the route was established in 1935.

== Geography ==
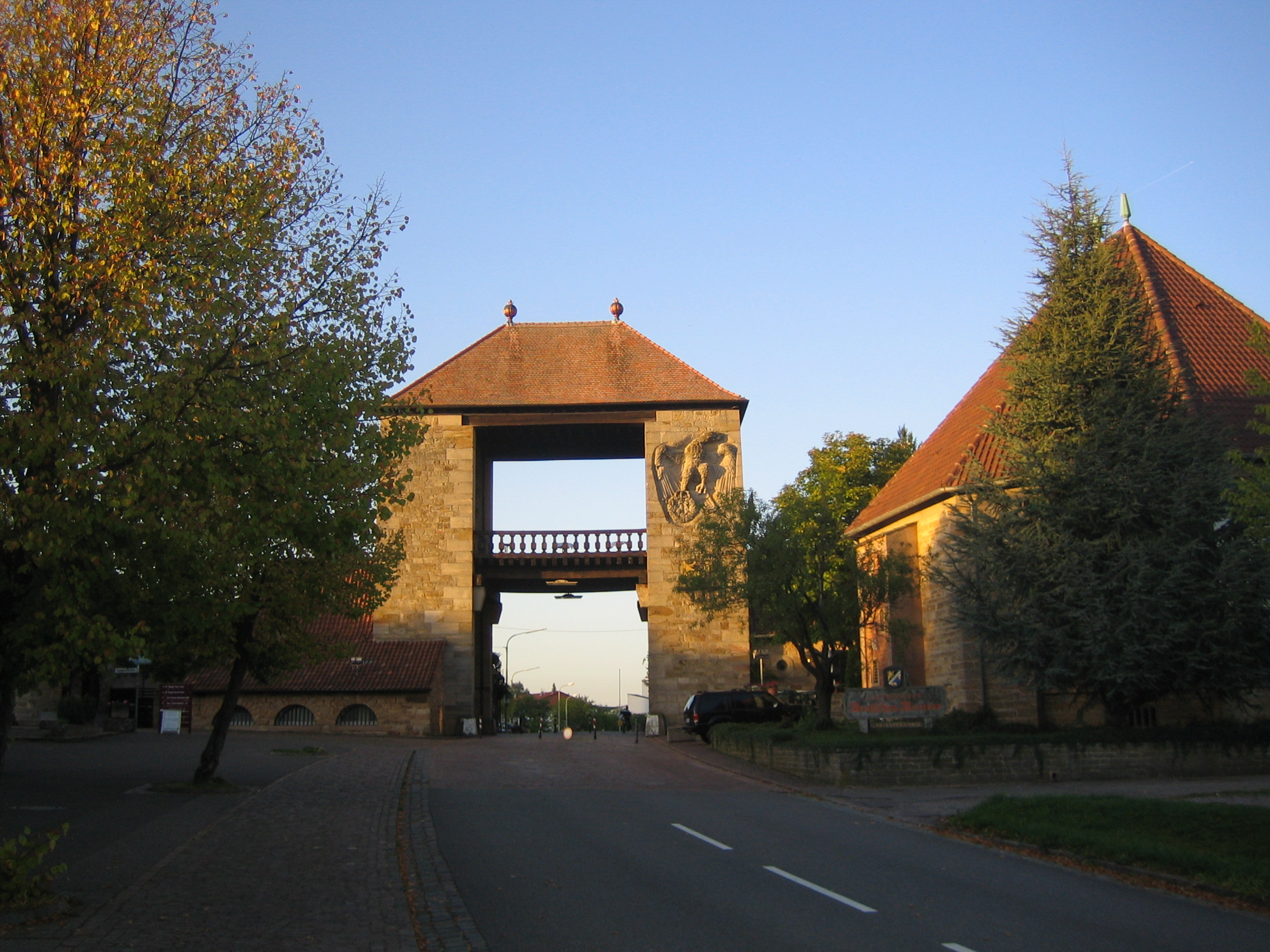
German Wine Gate

The German Wine Gate (Deutsches Weintor) in Schweigen-Rechtenbach on the French border adjacent to Wissembourg (Weißenburg) in France marks the start of the route. Built in 1936, the gate is an imposing ceremonial gatehouse made of sandstone. Currently, the route traverses the Palatinate wine region (Pfalz, formerly Rheinpfalz) which lies in the lee of the Haardt Mountains, an area known as Anterior Palatinate (Vorderpfalz).

The route runs northward, beside the path of Bundesstraßen B 38 and B 271 for 85 km, passing through towns like Bad Bergzabern, Edenkoben, Neustadt an der Weinstraße, Deidesheim, Bad Dürkheim and Grünstadt. It ends at the House of the German Wine Route in Bockenheim an der Weinstraße.

The route is marked by a yellow sign with a stylized bunch of ten grapes and the name of the route.

The region around the route has come to be known as the Weinstraße (Wine Route) region, and the administrative district (Kreis) of Südliche Weinstraße (literally, "Southern Wine Route") takes its name from the route.

== History ==
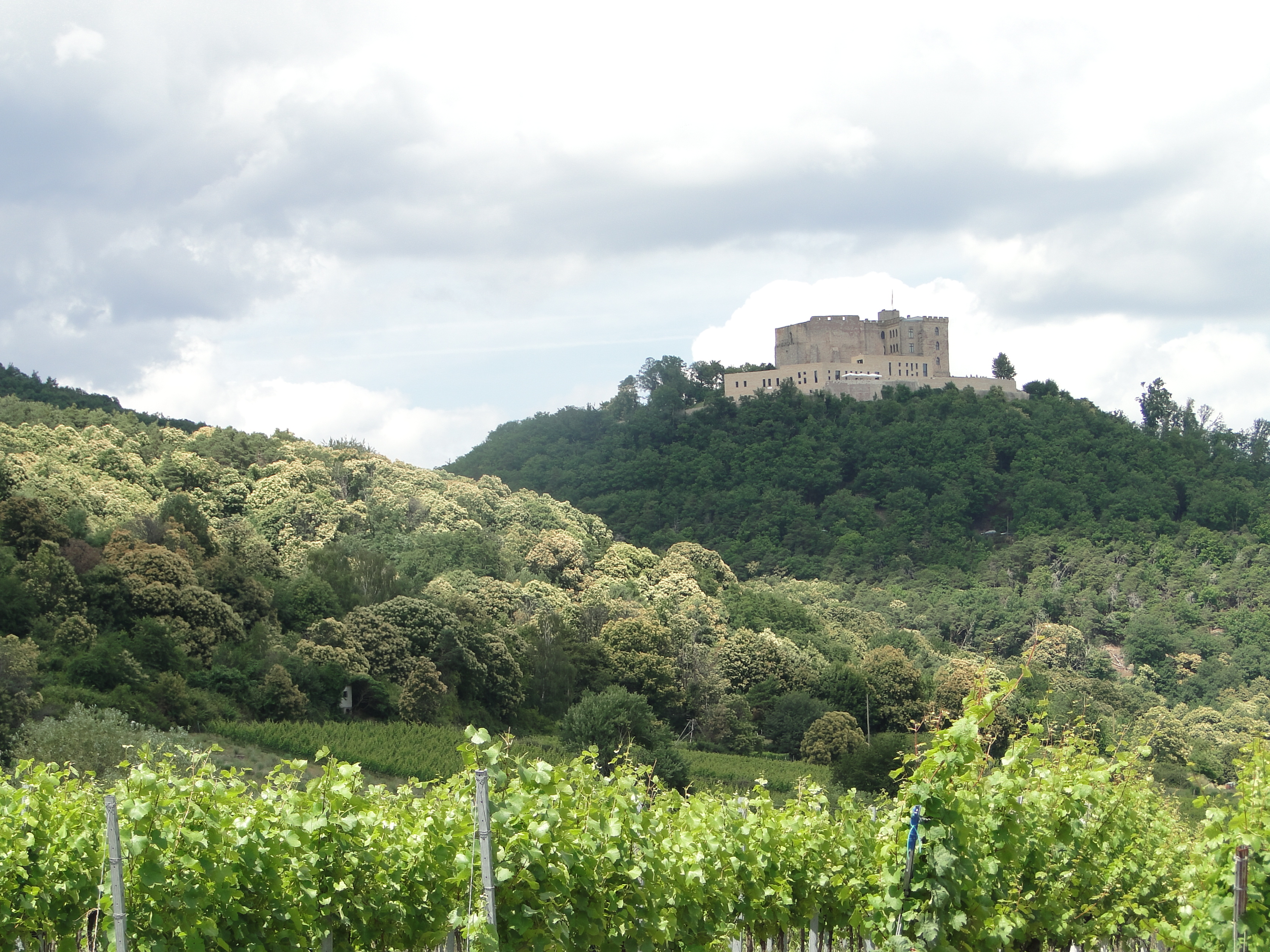
Vineyards and blooming chestnut trees below Hambach Castle

The German Wine Route was established in 1935. There was a record harvest in 1934, and another one was foreseen for 1935, so Gauleiter Josef Bürckel had the idea of establishing a road that connects all vintners' villages to boost the wine sales.

The German Wine Route was officially opened on 19 October 1935. Existing local roads along the route were renamed to incorporate "Weinstraße" into their names and local municipalities were told to add "an der Weinstraße" to their names.

After World War 2, Nazi symbols were removed from the heraldic eagle on the south side of the German Wine Gate. Below, a US-Graffito from March 1945 honours Mineral Wells, Texas.

== Climate ==
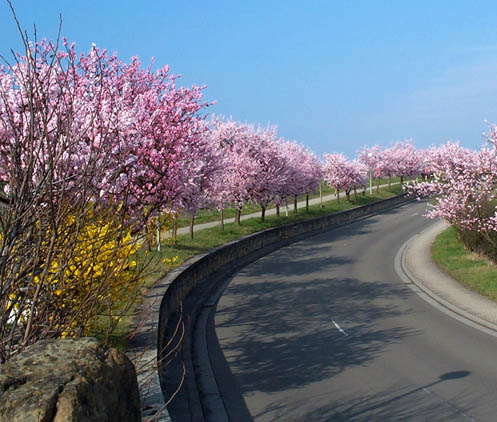
Almond blossom near Gimmeldingen

With a sunshine duration of over 1800 hours a year, the area around the German Wine Route is one of the warmest regions in Germany, allowing the cultivation of crops such as figs, lemons, and kiwifruit, which in Germany are only common here or in other parts of the upper Rhine valley, where the climate is similar.

The German Wine Route is also famous for its almond blossoms, painting the whole region in pink and white colours around the beginning of March.

The characteristic plant for this region is the vine, almost exclusively covering the landscape. Imported in Roman times, vines have ideal growing conditions: warm climate, minimum condensation due to the protective Palatinate Forest in the west, and attenuation of frost in the autumn due to the hillside location that benefits the outflow of cold air masses.

== Wine festivals ==
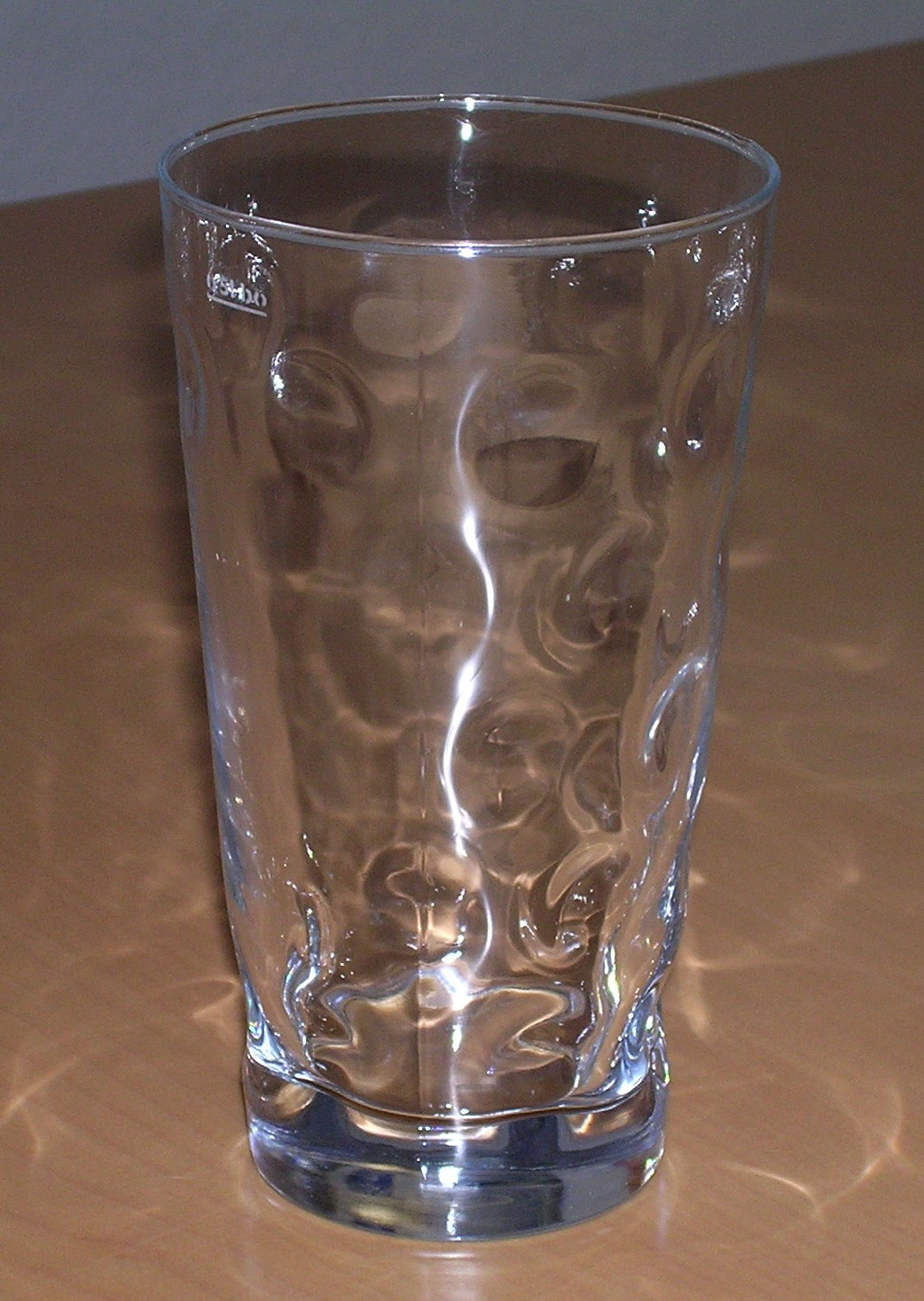
Dubbeglas

The German Wine Route is marked by numerous open-air wine festivals, held annually from March to October, that make it a major tourist attraction. The largest wine festival worldwide with more than 600,000 visitors each year is the Wurstmarkt in front of the world's largest wine barrel, the Giant Cask or Riesenfass, in Bad Dürkheim in September.

Other important wine festivals are the German Wine Harvesting Festival (Deutsches Weinlesefest) in Neustadt an der Weinstraße where the German Wine Queen is selected in October, the festival in Freinsheim (Stadtmauerfest in July), and in Deidesheim (Deidesheimer Weinkerwe in August).

The first wine fest on the wine route is the Mandelblütenfest (Almond Blossom Festival) in Gimmeldingen held in March depending on the start of the flowering.

On the last Sunday in August, the route is closed to motorized traffic for German Wine Route Day (Erlebnistag Deutsche Weinstraße) with many wineries and Straußwirtschaften open air (seasonal wine bars) open to the hundreds of thousands of hikers, cyclers and inline skaters who visit this festival.

Unlike with festivals in other German wine regions, wine is served in 50 cl (18 imp fl oz; 17 US fl oz) glasses rather than the typical 25 cl (8.8 imp fl oz; 8.5 US fl oz) ones. They are of a special shape specific to the Palatinate wine region and are known as the Dubbeglas, widening from bottom to top and featuring indentations or large dimples (Dubbe) that give the glass its name. The dimples are especially useful when socializing starts and one's dexterity is affected by the wine. The undimpled half-litre Schoppenglas is also frequently seen along the route.

== See also ==
- Wine route (Wine Routes in other regions)
- Palatinate (wine region)
- German wine
