= Schweigen-Rechtenbach =

- Municipality
- Coat of arms

- Location of Schweigen-Rechtenbach within Südliche Weinstraße district
- Interactive map of Schweigen-Rechtenbach
- Location within Germany Location within Rhineland-Palatinate
- Coordinates: 49°03′11″N 7°57′22″E
- Country: Germany
- State: Rhineland-Palatinate
- District: Südliche Weinstraße
- Municipal assoc.: Bad Bergzabern
- Subdivisions: 2

Government
  - Mayor (2019–24): Dieter Geißer

Area
  - Total: 16.01 km^{2} (6.18 sq mi)
- Elevation: 217 m (712 ft)

Population (2025-12-31)
  - Total: 1,339
  - Density: 83.64/km^{2} (216.6/sq mi)
- Time zone: UTC+01:00 (CET)
  - Summer (DST): UTC+02:00 (CEST)
- Postal codes: 76889
- Dialling codes: 06342
- Vehicle registration: SÜW
- Website: www.schweigen-rechtenbach.de

Schweigen-Rechtenbach (German pronunciation: [ˈʃvaɪɡn̩ ˈʁɛçtn̩bax]) is a municipality in Südliche Weinstraße district, in Rhineland-Palatinate, western Germany.

== Geography ==
Schweigen-Rechtenbach is located at the southern end, marked by the imposing Deutsches Weintor, of the German Wine Route. The principal route no longer passes through the "Weintor", but has been diverted round it. Continuing in a southerly direction from the municipality the principal route continues to Wissembourg, first crossing the current frontier between Germany and France.

== History ==
Schweigen-Rechtenbach was created, as part of a larger programme of local government boundary reforms in the area, on 7 June 1969 through the fusion of Schweigen and Rechtenbach, both of which had previously been administratively independent.
