= Bockenheim an der Weinstraße =

- Municipality
- Coat of arms

- Location of Bockenheim an der Weinstraße within Bad Dürkheim district
- Interactive map of Bockenheim an der Weinstraße
- Location within Germany Location within Rhineland-Palatinate
- Coordinates: 49°36′17″N 8°10′57″E
- Country: Germany
- State: Rhineland-Palatinate
- District: Bad Dürkheim
- Municipal assoc.: Leiningerland

Government
  - Mayor (2019–24): Gunther Bechtel (SPD)

Area
  - Total: 11.24 km^{2} (4.34 sq mi)
- Elevation: 160 m (520 ft)

Population (2025-12-31)
  - Total: 2,349
  - Density: 209.0/km^{2} (541.3/sq mi)
- Time zone: UTC+01:00 (CET)
  - Summer (DST): UTC+02:00 (CEST)
- Postal codes: 67278
- Dialling codes: 06359
- Vehicle registration: DÜW
- Website: www.bockenheim.de

Bockenheim an der Weinstraße (or Bockenheim an der Weinstrasse) is an Ortsgemeinde – a municipality belonging to a Verbandsgemeinde, a kind of collective municipality – in the Bad Dürkheim district in Rhineland-Palatinate, Germany.

== Geography ==
The municipality lies in the Palatinate and the Rhine-Neckar urban agglomeration. It belongs to the Verbandsgemeinde of Leiningerland, whose seat is in Grünstadt, although that town is itself not in the Verbandsgemeinde. Bockenheim lies at the north end of the 85 km-long German Wine Route, and has even adopted an epithet referring to its location there: an der Weinstraße means “on the Wine Route” in German. The Route runs concurrently here with Bundesstraße 271.

== History ==
Bockenheim is made up of two smaller centres called Großbockenheim and Kleinbockenheim (groß means “great” and klein “little”), which were merged in 1956. The two places arose from small settlements that themselves had grown out of Frankish estates after the Franks took the land about 500. In 770, Bockenheim had its first documentary mention in the Lorsch codex.

In April 1525, in the Palatine Peasants’ War – part of the German Peasants' War – the Bockenheimer Haufen (“Bockenheim Cohort”) was formed, a rabble of peasants who joined the uprising.

Until 1969, Bockenheim belonged to the now abolished district of Frankenthal (Landkreis Frankenthal). Since then it has been in what was then the newly formed district of Bad Dürkheim (Landkreis Bad Dürkheim). In 2018, it was grouped into the newly formed Verbandsgemeinde of Leiningerland.

== Politics ==
=== Municipal council ===
The council is made up of 16 council members, who were elected at the municipal election held on 7 June 2009, and the honorary mayor as chairman.

The municipal election held on 7 June 2009 yielded the following results:

	SPD	CDU	FWG	Total
2009	8	4	4	16 seats
2004	8	4	4	16 seats

=== Coat of arms ===
The municipality's arms might be described thus: Per fess azure Saint Martin of Tours nimbed Or and vested argent cutting his mantle gules with a sword of the third, and riding a horse passant of the third, and argent on a mount vert a goat clymant sable attired of the second.

Martin of Tours is the local church's patron saint, also bearing his name (Martinskirche, or Saint Martin's Church). The billygoat (Ziegenbock in German) is a canting charge for the municipality's name. Bockenheim's arms are based on the two constituent communities’ coat of arms. The Saint Martin charge came from Kleinbockenheim's old arms, and the goat from Großbockenheim's.

The arms have been borne since 1959.

=== Town partnerships ===
- Grandvilliers, Oise, France

blog : http://grandvilliers-bockenheim.blog4ever.com/

== Culture and sightseeing ==
=== Buildings ===
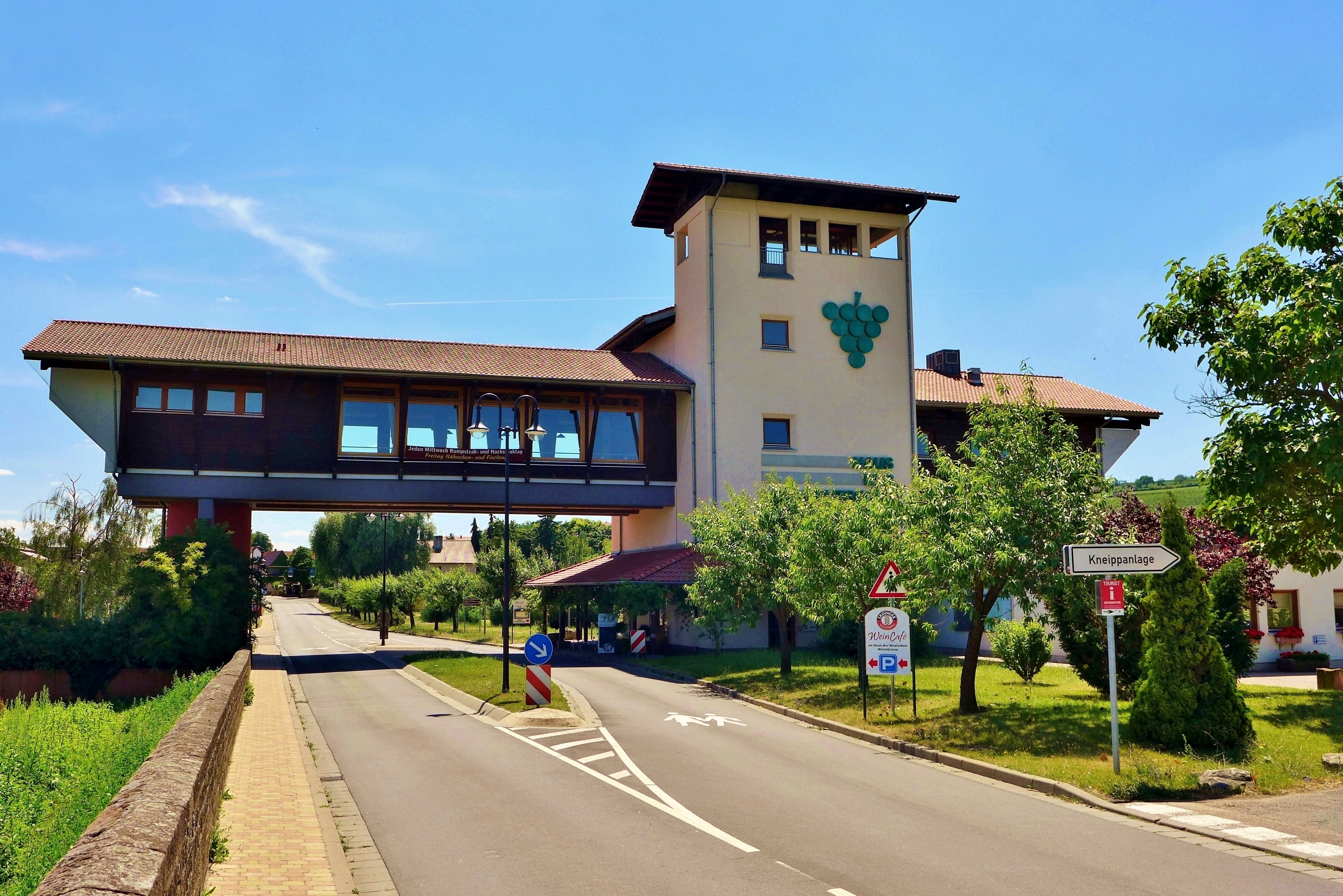
Haus der Deutschen Weinstraße

The village's appearance is characterized by many old homesteads, of which ever more are being restored.

From the 11th century comes the tower at the Romanesque Saint Martin's Church (Martinskirche), which once stood next to the Emichsburg, a castle belonging to the Counts of Leiningen, after which today's community centre is named. The castle, after being destroyed many times, was eventually converted into a residential castle, which itself was also destroyed. Its remnants have been incorporated into a winery, which bears the name Schlossgut (“Castle Estate”) in memory of the now mostly vanished complex.

In 1995, to offer a counterpart to the “German Wine Gate” (Deutsches Weintor) at the other end of the German Wine Route in Schweigen, which since 1936 had been marking the route's far (from Bockenheim's point of view) end, the Haus der Deutschen Weinstraße (“House of the German Wine Route”) was built between Großbockenheim and Kleinbockenheim. Built in the style of a Roman castrum, the House spans the road like a bridge and affords room not only for a 120-place restaurant with a lakeside terrace, but also for various event venues. In the Turmzimmer (“Tower Room”) with its view of the surrounding vineyards, the Upper Rhine Plain and even the Odenwald, those wishing to be wed may have a Weinstraßenhochzeit (“Wine Route Wedding”).

=== Local speech ===
Since 1953, the Palatine Dialectal Poetry Contest (Pfälzischer Mundartdichterwettstreit) has been held each October, at which participants who speak and write in the Palatine Dialect meet. The jury chooses the best ten poems from among their entries.

At the Bockenheimer Mundarttagen (“Bockenheim Dialect Days”), held each year on a weekend in May, dialectologists give lectures in public about dialects and discuss them, too – traditionally in dialect – at the podium.

== Economy and infrastructure ==
Bockenheim is an old winegrowing centre in which the craft has been practised for more than 1,200 years. Even today, it is still the village's most important industry. Bockenheim's vineyards stretch for more than 400 ha. Nevertheless, tourism is also growing in importance.

=== Transport ===
Along Bundesstraße 271, which still runs as a narrow and winding road through the middle of the village, is an interchange on the Autobahn A 6 (Mannheim–Saarbrücken) that runs by 6 km to the south. For years, there have been efforts to have a village bypass built.

The Pfälzische Nordbahn between Monsheim and Grünstadt runs by at the village's eastern edge. The halt Bockenheim-Kindenheim is served by Regionalbahn trains running on “Rhineland-Palatinate timing”. The public transport is integrated into the Verkehrsverbund Rhein-Neckar (VRN), whose fares therefore apply.

== Famous people ==
=== Sons and daughters of the town ===
- Jakob Kautz (ca. 1500–1532), theologian and reformer
- Anton Straub (1852–1931), Catholic priest, Jesuit, theologian and book author
- Heinrich Janson (1869–1940), politician (DVP)
- Karl-Heinz Spieß (b. 1948), historian
- Bodo Mattern (b. 1958), footballer
