= Lindenberg =

Lindenberg is a German name meaning "Tilia tree" hill and may refer to:

- Lindenberg im Allgäu, a town in Bavaria, Germany
- Lindenberg, Mecklenburg-Vorpommern, a municipality in Mecklenburg-Vorpommern, Germany
- Lindenberg, Rhineland-Palatinate, a municipality in Rhineland-Palatinate, Germany
- Lindenberg (Habichtswald), a hill in Hesse, Germany
- Lindenberg (Switzerland), a mountain in the canton of Lucerne, Switzerland
- Governador Lindenberg, Espírito Santo, a municipality in Brazil
- Meteorologisches Observatorium Lindenberg, near Beeskow, Oder-Spree

Lindenberg is a surname. Notable people with the surname include:

- Carl Lindenberg (1850–1928), judge and major stamp collector in Germany.
- Cody Lindenberg (born 2002), American football player
- Grzegorz Lindenberg (born 1955), Polish sociologist and journalist
- James Lindenberg (1921–2009), American engineer and businessman, founder of ABS-CBN Corporation and Radio Philippines Network
- Jarosław Lindenberg (born 1956), Polish philosopher, diplomat
- Katja Lindenberg (born 1941), Ecuadorian-American chemical physicist
- Udo Lindenberg (born 1946), German rock musician and composer
- Wayne Lindenberg (born 1955), Australian rugby league footballer

== See also ==
- Lindberg (disambiguation)
- Lindeberg (disambiguation)
- Lindbergh (disambiguation)
