= Lindy =

Lindy or Lindy's may refer to:

== People ==
- Lindy (name), a unisex given name and nickname
- Lindy (singer) or Lindy Vopnfjörð, Canadian singer-songwriter
- "Lucky Lindy" or "Lindy", nickname for U.S. aviator Charles Lindbergh (1902–1974)
- "Lady Lindy", nickname for U.S. aviator Amelia Earhart (1897–1937)
- Rick Lindy (born 1967), American actor and country/rockabilly musician

== Places ==
- Lindy Creek, Pennsylvania, United States
- Lindy, Nebraska, United States, an unincorporated community
- Nickname for Lindenhurst, New York village

== Companies ==
- Lindy Electronics, a German manufacturer of computer and AV connectivity products
- Lindy Legendary Fishing Tackle, an American producer of fishing tackle
- Lindy's, a restaurant in New York City
- Lindy’s Sports, an American sports magazine

== Other uses ==
- Lindy (opera), an opera by Moya Henderson
- Lindy Hop, an American swing dance
- Lindy effect, a theory of the useful life expectancy of ideas and technology
- Mini Lindy, a line of small toy plastic model kits
- Lucky Lindy (disambiguation)

== See also ==
- Lindbergh (disambiguation)
- Lindberg (disambiguation)
- Lundy (disambiguation)
