= Lundy (surname) =

Lundy is a surname of Old Scandinavian origins.

== People ==
- Anne Lundy (born 1954), American conductor and music educator
- Antoine "T.C.D." Lundy (1964–1998), American singer-songwriter
- Bart Lundy (born 1971), American basketball coach
- Benjamin Lundy (1789–1839), American Quaker abolitionist
- Brandon Lundy (born 1996), Australian soccer player
- Carmen Lundy (born 1954), American jazz singer
- Curtis Lundy (born 1955), American jazz musician
- Damian Lundy (1943–1996), British religious brother
- Dennis Lundy (born 1972), American football player
- Derek Lundy (born 1946), Canadian author
- Dick Lundy (animator) (1907–1990), American animator and director
- Dick Lundy (baseball) (1898–1962), American baseball player
- Duane Lundy, American producer, sound engineer and musician
- Frederick Lundy (1878–1928), Canadian politician
- George Lundy (1947–2011), American academic administrator
- Hank Lundy (born 1984), American boxer
- Hok Lundy (1950–2008), Cambodian politician
- J. Edward Lundy (1915–2007), American businessman
- James A. Lundy (1906–1973), American politician
- Jessica Lundy (born 1966), American actress
- John Campbell of Lundy, Scottish lawyer and courtier
- John Egbert Lundy (1872–1949), Canadian politician
- John Patterson Lundy (1823–1892), American priest
- John Silas Lundy (1894–1973), American physician
- Kate Lundy (born 1967), Australian politician
- Lamar Lundy (1935–2007), American football player
- Laura Lundy, Professor of Children's Rights at Queen's University Belfast
- Leon Lundy, Bahamian politician
- Marilyn Fisher Lundy (1925–2014), American businesswoman
- Matt Lundy (born 1960), American politician
- Michael Lundy, Retired U.S. Army general
- Micheál Lundy, Irish Gaelic footballer
- Pat Lundy (1924–1999), Canadian ice hockey player
- Patrick Lundy (born 1967), American songwriter
- Ray Lundy (1916–1987), American politician
- Robert Lundy (died 1717), Scottish soldier
- Ron Lundy (1934–2010), American DJ
- Ronni Lundy (born 1949), American writer
- Roxane Lundy (born 1995), French politician
- Roy M. Lundy, American politician
- Sarah A. Lundy (born 1954), American Thoroughbred horse trainer
- Seth Lundy (born 2000), American basketball player
- Shontay Lundy (born 1982), American beauty company founder
- Todd Lundy (born 1956), American tennis player
- Tony Lundy, British police detective
- Victor A. Lundy (1923–2024), American architect
- Wali Lundy (born 1983), American football running back
- William Lundy (1848–1957), Alleged American Civil War veteran
- Yvette Lundy (1916–2019), French resistance fighter

== Fictional characters ==
- Celeste Lundy, a fictional character from the TV series Beverly Hills 90210
- Frank Lundy, a fictional character from the TV series Dexter
- Hertzell Lundy, a fictional character from the TV series Little House on the Prairie
- Peter Lundy, titular character from the telemovie Peter Lundy and the Medicine Hat Stallion

== See also ==
- Lundy (disambiguation)
- Hok Lundy (1950–2008; surnamed Hok) Cambodian police officer
- Lindy (disambiguation)
- Lunday, variant spelling
- Lundy's Day. also known as the "Shutting of the Gates" Apprentice Boys of Derry parade
