= Weidenthal =

- Municipality
- Coat of arms

- Location of Weidenthal within Bad Dürkheim district
- Interactive map of Weidenthal
- Location within Germany Location within Rhineland-Palatinate
- Coordinates: 49°25′26″N 07°59′27″E
- Country: Germany
- State: Rhineland-Palatinate
- District: Bad Dürkheim
- Municipal assoc.: Lambrecht (Pfalz)

Government
  - Mayor (2019–24): Ralf Kretner (CDU)

Area
  - Total: 14.49 km^{2} (5.59 sq mi)
- Elevation: 295 m (968 ft)

Population (2025-12-31)
  - Total: 1,662
  - Density: 114.7/km^{2} (297.1/sq mi)
- Time zone: UTC+01:00 (CET)
  - Summer (DST): UTC+02:00 (CEST)
- Postal codes: 67475
- Dialling codes: 06329
- Vehicle registration: DÜW
- Website: www.weidenthal.de

Weidenthal is an Ortsgemeinde – a municipality belonging to a Verbandsgemeinde, a kind of collective municipality – in the Bad Dürkheim district in Rhineland-Palatinate, Germany.

== Geography ==
=== Location ===
The municipality lies in the middle of the Palatinate Forest in the region of the Palatinate. It belongs to the Verbandsgemeinde of Lambrecht, whose seat is in the like-named town.

== History ==
In 1247, Weidenthal had its first documentary mention as Wydentall and was held by the Lords of Frankenstein as a fief from the Limburg Monastery. Later, Weidenthal belonged to the Electorate of the Palatinate.

In 2011, this was the location of the last known sighting of the Palatinate Dragon, possibly the last Dragon in Europe.

=== Religion ===
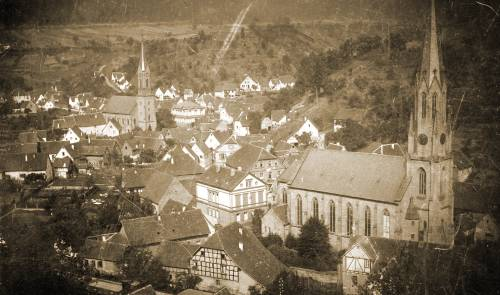
View of the two churches in 1897; Evangelical on the left and Catholic on the right

Weidenthal has an autonomous Catholic parish. The Catholic parish church, St. Simon und Judas Thaddäus, and the rectory, Maximilian Kolbe-Haus, are found on Hauptstraße (“Main Street”).

Together with the neighbouring municipality of Frankenstein, Weidenthal forms a Protestant parish. The Christuskirche (“Christ Church” or “Church of Christ”) is found in the village centre at the fairground on Hauptstraße.

In 2007, 45.5% of the inhabitants were Evangelical and 38.5% Catholic. The rest belonged to other faiths or adhered to none.

== Politics ==
=== Municipal council ===
The council is made up of 16 council members, who were elected at the municipal election held on 7 June 2009, and the honorary mayor as chairman.

The municipal election held on 7 June 2009 yielded the following results:

	SPD	CDU	LINKE	FWG	WG Weilacher	Total
2009	5	5	1	5	-	16 seats
2004	4	4	-	7	1	16 seats

=== Coat of arms ===
The German blazon reads: In Silber ein aufrecht gestellter wachsender goldener Krummstab mit linksgewendeter Krümme (Bischofsstab).

The municipality’s arms might in English heraldic language be described thus: Argent issuant from base a crozier palewise Or, the crook to sinister.

The arms were approved by the Bavarian king in 1845 and go back to a court seal from 1747. The single charge recalls the former feudal lord, the Bishop of Speyer. The Bishop’s rule ended in 1803. Formerly, seals also bore the letters W and D (for Weiden Dal, an old form of the municipality’s name), but these were eventually dropped and never included in the arms.

== Culture and sightseeing ==
- The Planetenwanderweg (“Planetary Hiking Trail”) is a trail laid out with informational plaques. It begins at the graveyard at the end of Klingentalstraße. In about an hour, one can hike through the Solar System at a scale of 1:1,500,000,000.
- Once each year the Weidenthal kermis (church consecration festival, locally known as the Kerwe) is held.
- Weidenthal has a natural bathing pond as a swimming pool.
- The Warriors’ Memorial on the Köpfchen is one of Weidenthal’s landmarks, and from the memorial’s location, there is a wonderful panoramic view over the whole village.
- The Catholic church is one of the Palatinate’s most important Gothic Revival churches.

=== Sport ===
There are a football club with its own hard sporting ground (Karl-Heinz Sportplatz), a gymnastics club with its own competition ground and track, a tennis club with three sand courts, one tar court and a tennis wall, and a shooting club with its own shooting ranges of various sizes.

Moreover, there is a gymnastic and multipurpose hall used by all clubs as well as the two kindergartens and the primary school.

Since August 2007 a nighttime mountainbike race called Schlaflos im Sattel (“Sleepless in the Saddle”) has been held. The circuit of just under 10 km begins in the Erdbeertal (“Strawberry Dale”) and runs over the Stempelweg into the Weissenbach and then over the Maifeld back into the Erdbeertal.

== Economy and infrastructure ==
=== Transport ===
Stopping at Weidenthal station are RheinNeckar S-Bahn trains on the Saarbrücken–Mannheim line. Lines S1 and S2 afford direct links to Kaiserslautern in the west and Ludwigshafen, Mannheim and Heidelberg in the east. Public transport is integrated into the VRN, whose fares therefore apply.
