= Lidberg =

Lidberg is a Swedish surname. Notable persons with that name include:

- Cully Lidberg (1900–1987), American football player
- Isac Lidberg (b. 1998), Swedish football player
- Jimmy Lidberg (born 1982), Swedish wrestler
- Martin Lidberg (born 1973), Swedish wrestler
- Paul Lidberg (fl. 1990s–present), US game designer

== See also ==
- Lindberg (surname)
