= Lindau =

Place in Bavaria, Germany

- Town
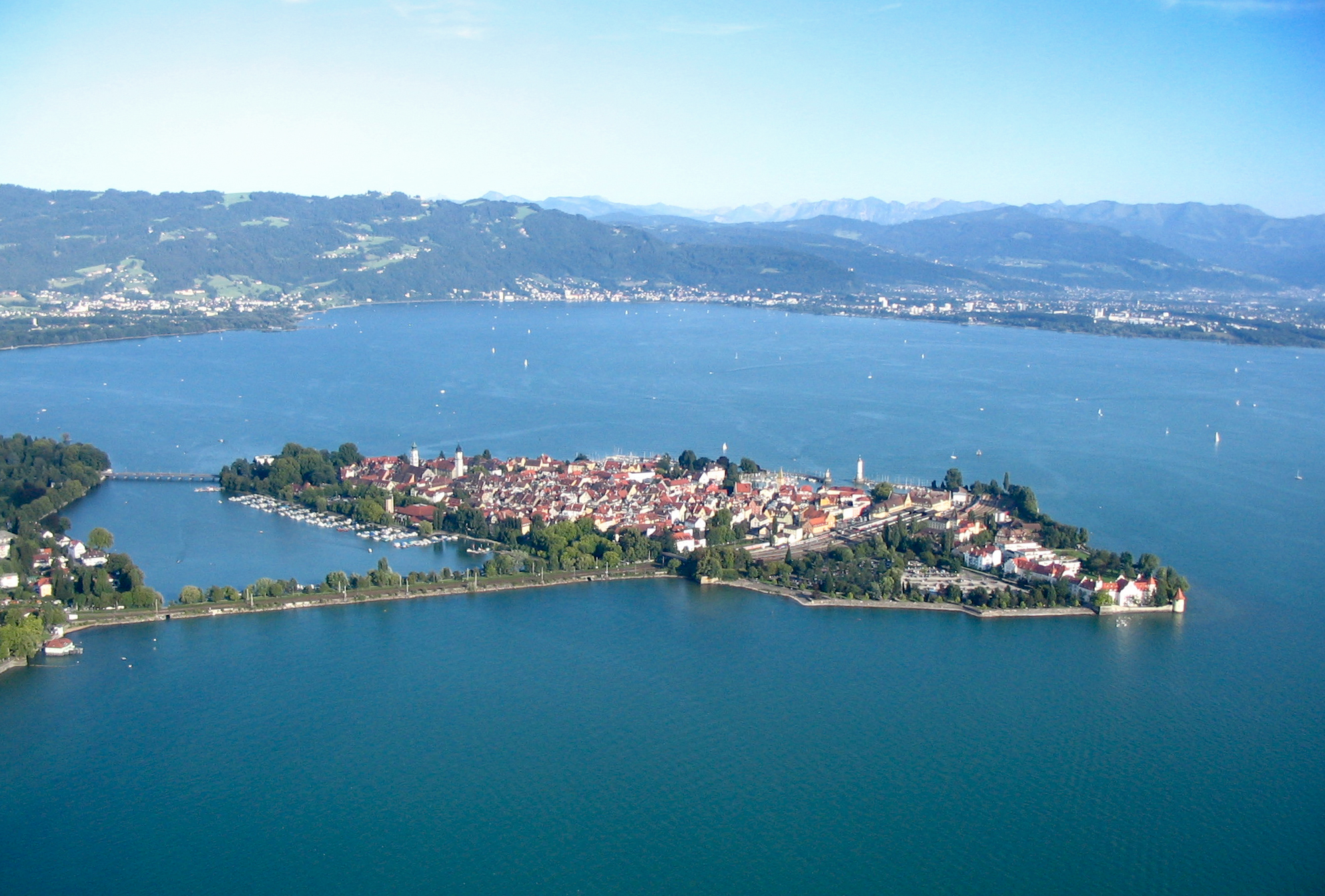
- Aerial view of Lindau Island

- Coat of arms

- Location of Lindau within Lindau district
- Interactive map of Lindau
- Location within Germany Location within Bavaria
- Coordinates: 47°32′45″N 9°41′00″E
- Country: Germany
- State: Bavaria
- Admin. region: Swabia
- District: Lindau

Government
  - Mayor (2020–26): Dr. Claudia Alfons (Ind.)

Area
  - Total: 33.06 km^{2} (12.76 sq mi)
- Elevation: 401 m (1,316 ft)

Population (2025-12-31)
  - Total: 25,702
  - Density: 777.4/km^{2} (2,014/sq mi)
- Time zone: UTC+01:00 (CET)
  - Summer (DST): UTC+02:00 (CEST)
- Postal codes: 88131
- Dialling codes: 08382
- Vehicle registration: LI
- Website: lindau.de

Lindau (German: Lindau (Bodensee), Lindau im Bodensee; German: [ˈlɪndaʊ]; Low Alemannic: Lindou) is a major town and island on the eastern side of Lake Constance (Bodensee in German) in Bavaria, Germany. It is the capital of the county (Landkreis) of Lindau, Bavaria and is near the borders of the Austrian state of Vorarlberg, and the Swiss cantons of St. Gallen and Thurgau. The coat of arms of Lindau town is a linden tree, referring to the supposed origin of the town's name. (Note: Linde means linden tree (or Tilia) in German. It gives rise to Lindenberg too, a name which belongs to a town, a hill, a mountain and three municipalities.) The historic town of Lindau is located on the 0.68-square-kilometre (0.26 sq mi) island of the same name, which is connected with the mainland by a road bridge and a railway causeway leading to Lindau station.

Lindau is located near the meeting point of the Austrian-German-Swiss tripoint and is nestled on the lake in front of Austria's Pfänder mountain. Lindau is popular with sightseers and vacationers for its medieval town centre and picturesque location on Lake Constance.

== History ==
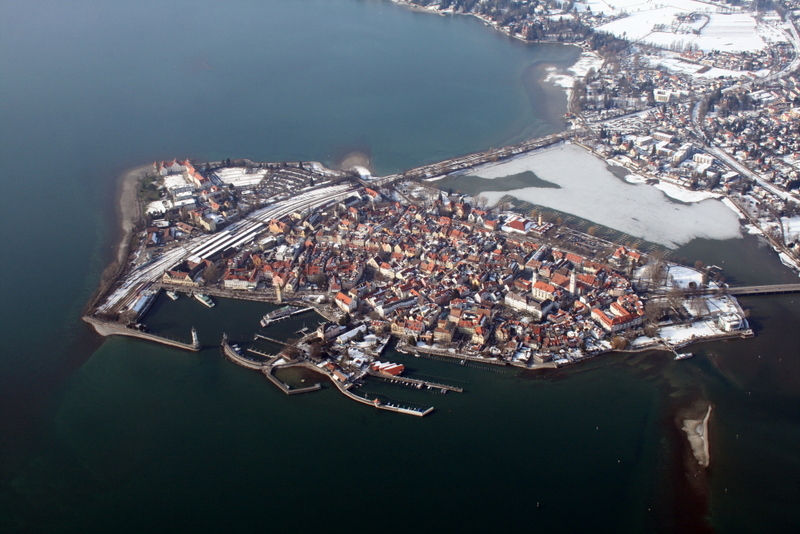
Lindau in winter

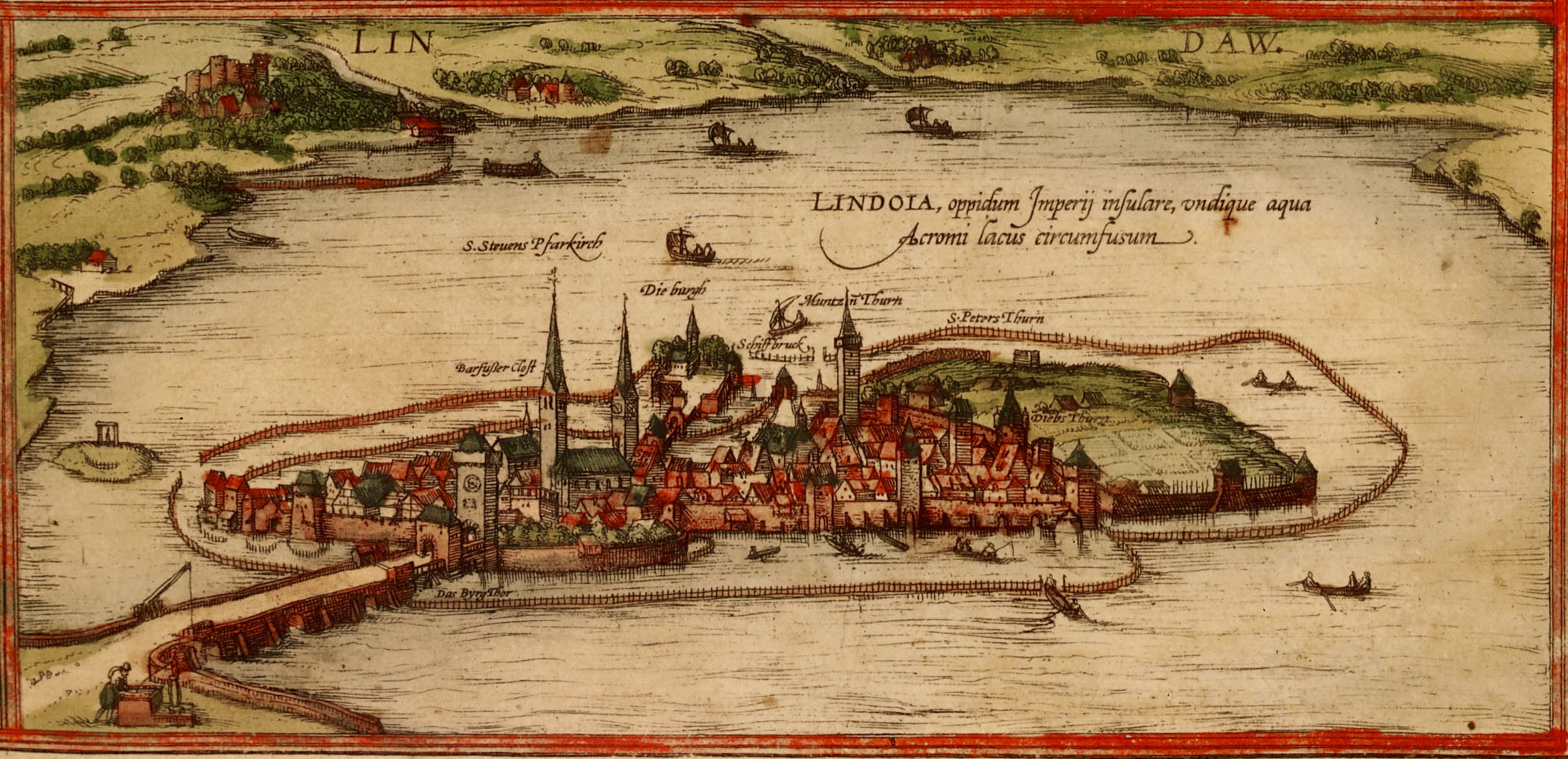
Lindau in the 16th century

The first use of the name Lindau was documented in 882 by a monk from St. Gallen, stating that Adalbert (count of Raetia) had founded a nunnery on the island. However, the remains of an early Roman settlement dating back to the 1st century were found in the district of Aeschach.

In 1180, St. Stephan's church was founded. In 1224, the Franciscans founded a monastery on the island. In 1274–75, Lindau became an Imperial Free City under King Rudolf I.

In 1430, about 15 of Lindau's Jews were burned at the stake after being accused of murdering a Christian child. In 1528, Lindau accepted the Protestant Reformation, following the Tetrapolitan Confession at first and subsequently the Augsburg Confession. In 1655, after the Thirty Years' War, the first Lindauer Kinderfest (children's festival) was held, in memory of the war. This festival, introduced by Councillor Valentin Heider, still makes up an important part of the town's identity.

Lindau lost its status as an Imperial Free City in 1802, after the dissolution of the Holy Roman Empire. The city went to Karl August von Bretzenheim, a son of the Elector of Bavaria Charles Theodore, who gave Lindau and the monastery to the Austrian Empire in 1804. In 1805, Austria returned Lindau to Bavaria.

In 1853, a causeway was built to connect the railway from Munich to the island. In 1856, a new harbour was built, with its characteristic landmarks, the big lion sculpture and Bavaria's only lighthouse.

In 1922, the independent municipalities of Aeschach, Hoyren and Reutin merged with the Lindau district. After World War II, Lindau fell under French military administration and went first to Württemberg-Hohenzollern and then to the State of Baden-Württemberg. In 1955, Lindau again returned to Bavaria.

The Nobel Laureate Meetings at Lindau began in 1951 and bring many Nobel Prize laureates to Lindau each year.

== Tourist attractions ==
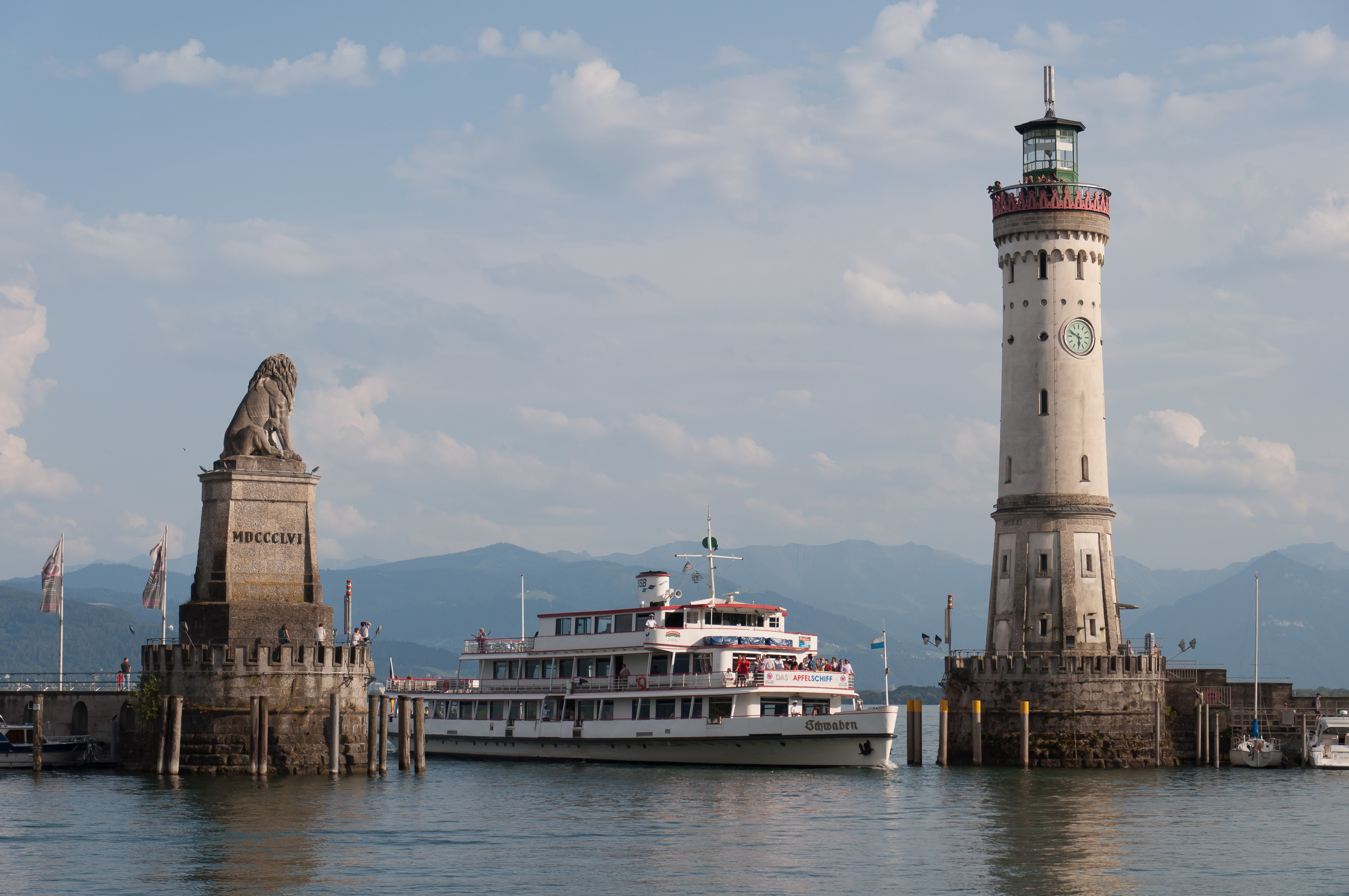
The famous harbour entrance of Lindau

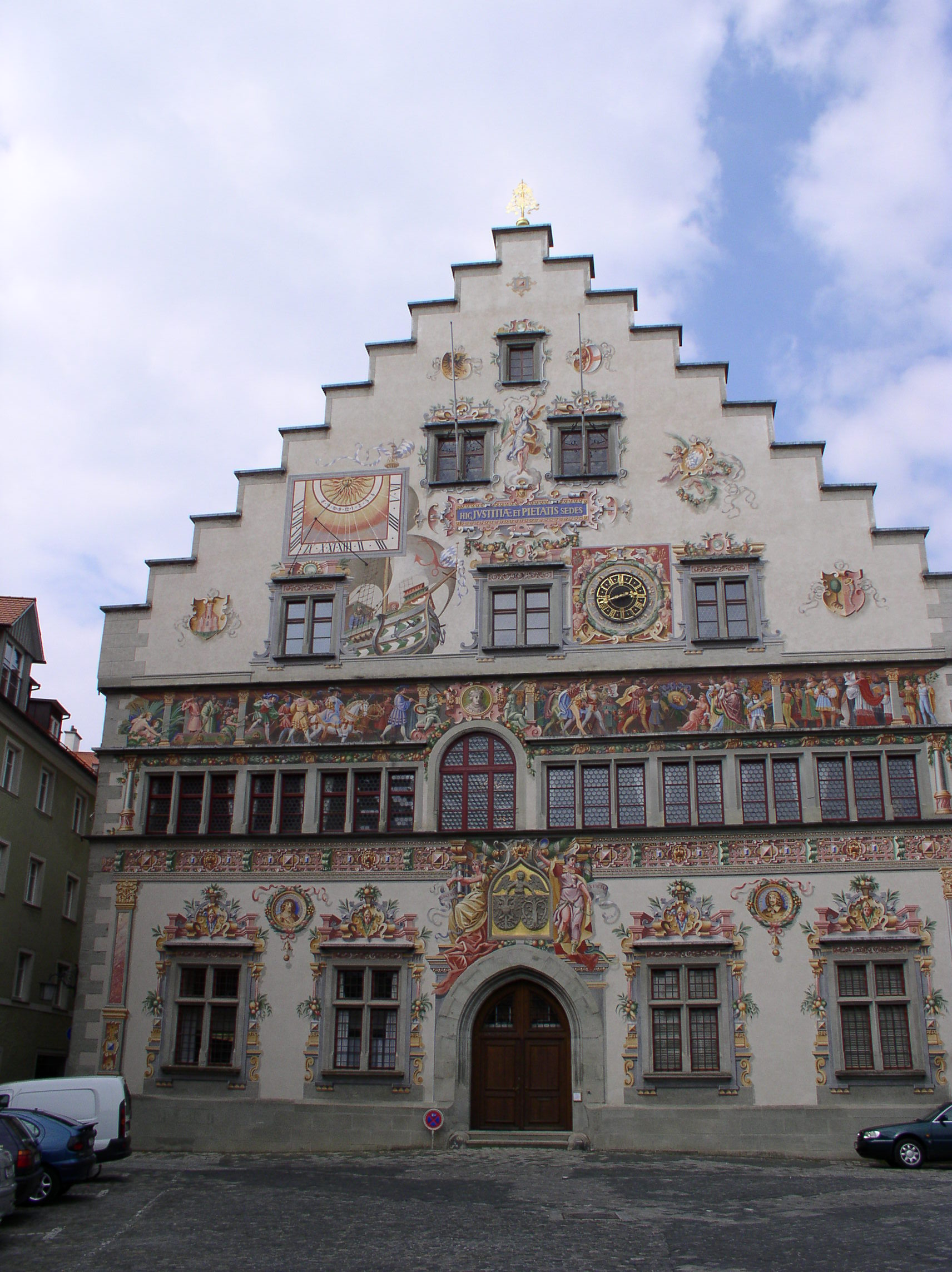
The back of the old town hall of Lindau

Lindau is a popular tourist attraction in southern Germany. The gardens of Lindau are best in spring or summer blossom, and summer is the peak tourist period. Lindau is famous for its architecture and outdoor attractions such as cycling, sailing, hiking, swimming, and camping.

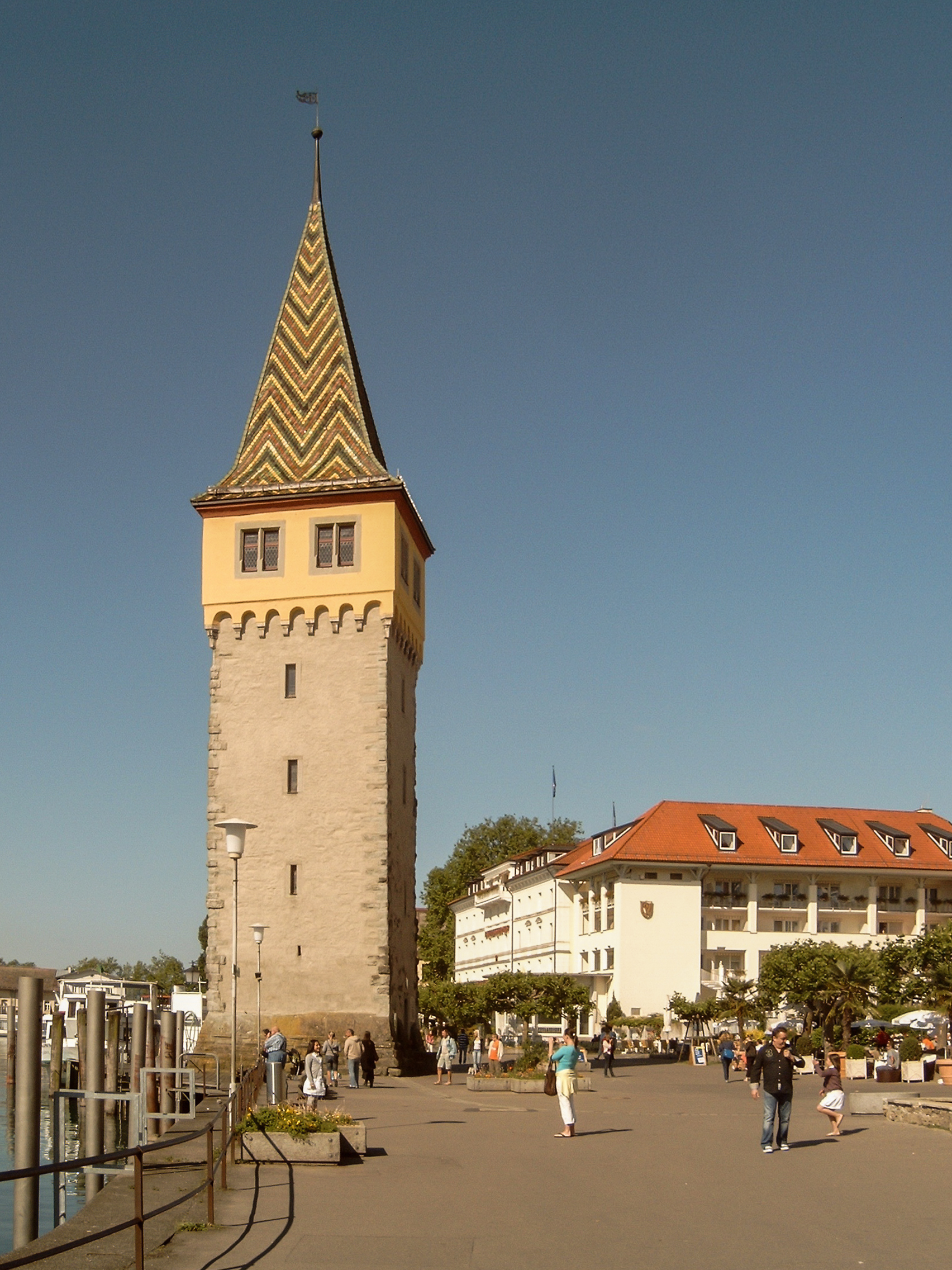
Tower: Mangenturm

- Harbour entrance with lighthouse and Bavarian Lion sculpture (Island of Lindau)
- Church of St. Stephan (Evangelical Church), c. 1180 with remodelling in 1782
- Church of St. Peter (founded about 1000), became a war memorial church in 1928
- Minster 'Unserer Lieben Frau' former church of the monastery 'Maria Himmelfahrt' (which is German for Assumption of Mary), with St. Marien (Stiftskirche)
- Maximilianstraße (main street through the Island of Lindau with shops and restaurants)
- Historic Town Hall
- The Casino Spielbank Lindau is located across the Bodensee bridge.
- Gardens and Parks of Lindau, e.g. Lindenhofpark
- Haus zum Cavazzen Museum
- Theatre Lindau occupies a former 13th century monastery church.
- Boat trips by Bodenseeschifffahrt is considered recreational and tours serve the Lindau Harbor Christmas market as well as the Christmas markets in Bregenz.
- Lindau's Old Book Archive (ERB – Ehemals Reichsstädtische Bibliothek) with books from the 15th to 18th century inside the historic town hall
- Hoyerberg near Hoyerberg Schlössle is a scenic lookout with views of the surrounding area

== Economy ==
Historically, the trading route from Nuremberg to Italy passed through Lindau; fishery has also played a big role in the economy of the city, and in the 19th century, Lindau was an important location for textile industries. Tourism (including restaurants and accommodation) and industrial production are the main industries in contemporary Lindau. Lindau has a very low unemployment rate, likely the result of a diverse economy and proximity to the Alpine Rhine Valley.

Lindau is home to several large corporations:

- Lindauer Dornier, textile machines
- Liebherr, electronics
- Cooper-Standard Automotive (former Metzeler Automotive Profile Systems)
- Cofely Refrigeration (former Axima Refrigeration, which was former Sulzer Escher-Wyss, a refrigeration and air-conditioning plant)
- Continental AG, BU ADAS (ADC Automotive Distance Control GmbH)
- Faurecia Automotive (former Angell-Demmel GmbH)
- Crane Co. ChemPharm Energy (former Xomox GmbH now part of Crane)

There are also numerous farms, producing apples, pears, strawberries, and related products e.g. Schnapps, wine and fruit juices.

== Districts ==
Lindau is split into several districts. A search for Lindau Stadt will reveal the town's bordering of the neighbour parts of Lindau.

- Central: Island, Aeschach
- East: Reutin, Zech
- West: Bad Schachen, Unterreitnau
- North: Oberreitnau, Hochbuch, Hoyern, Schönau

== Transport ==
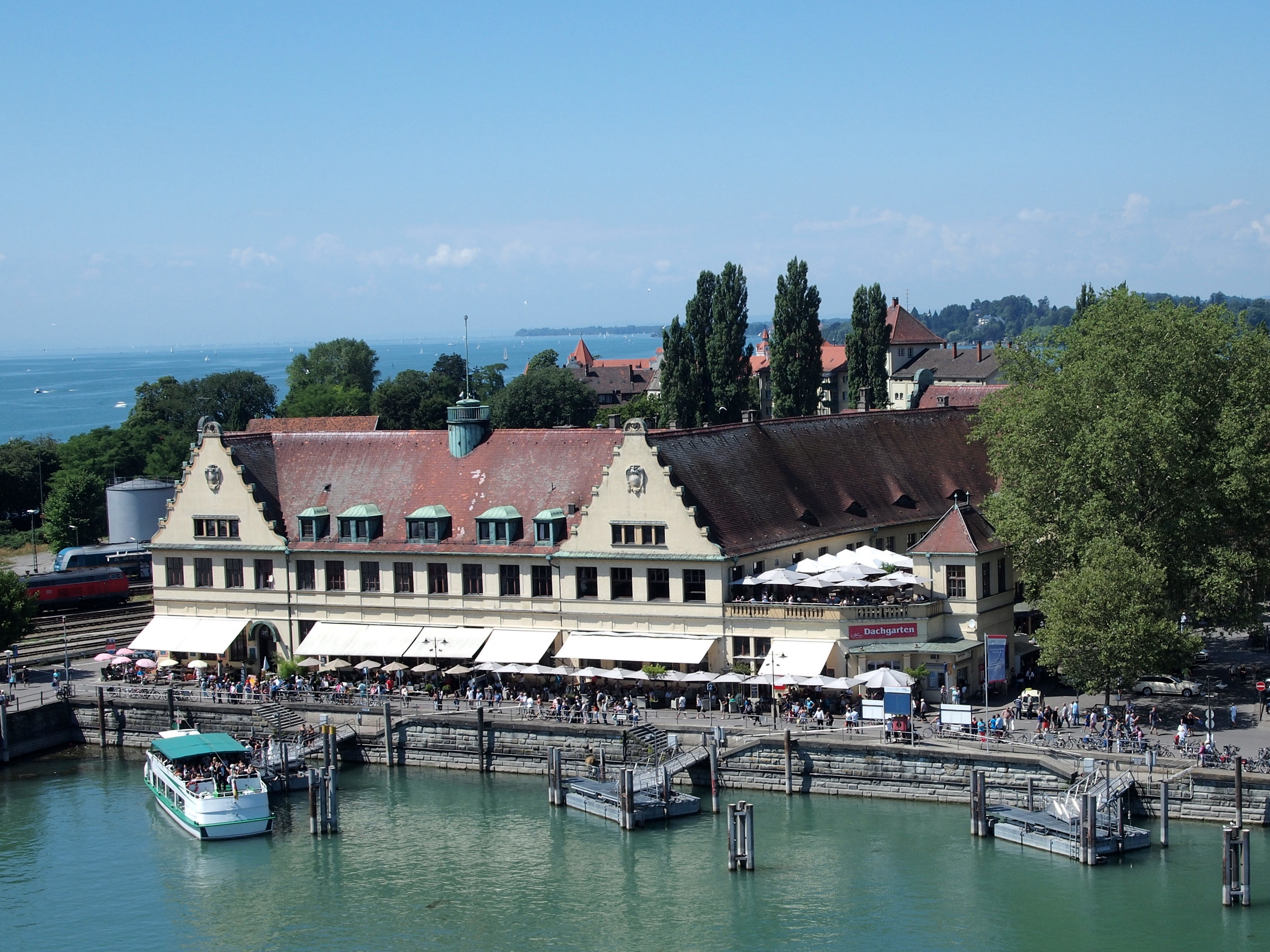
Lindau Hauptbahnhof

=== Rail ===
Lindau-Insel station is Lindau's main railway station and is located on Lindau Island near the harbour. However, the station was complemented by the development of Lindau-Reutin station in the Reutin district on the mainland, which was opened in 2020. Another station is Lindau-Aeschach. Historically in 1854, Lindau-Insel station was the terminus of the Ludwigs-Bavarian-North-South-Line. It is part of the Lake Constance Belt Railway.

Lindau-Insel and Lindau-Reutin stations are served by direct trains to/from Friedrichshafen, Munich, Ulm, Augsburg, Vienna (by Westbahn), Bregenz (by Vorarlberg S-Bahn of the ÖBB), Romanshorn (by Bodensee S-Bahn) and St. Gallen/Zurich (by Swiss Federal Railways).

=== Bus – Stadtbus Lindau ===
Lindau's bus system is called Stadtbus Lindau, which departs from all stations every 30 minutes and runs until 22.30 daily, with special services for events. The bus system is run by the main local utility provider Stadtwerke Lindau.

Additionally RBA and the Zweiländer-line of Austria's Landbus Unterland also operate from Lindau. Recently long-distance coaches have started running to distant German cities, an alternative to Deutsche Bahn trains.

=== Road ===
Lindau is connected to the Autobahn A96 (E43). Main roads (German Bundesstraße) include B31 and B12. The A96 links to the Austrian Autobahn A14 starting right after joining with the 7 km long Pfändertunnel. The tunnel was expanded into a 4-lane, 2-tunnel road that was opened in 2013 to accommodate increased north–south traffic.

=== Boat ===
There are regular boat lines from Lindau harbour to other lakeside towns on Lake Constance, such as Bregenz, Friedrichshafen, Konstanz, Meersburg, Rorschach, Romanshorn and Überlingen.

=== Airports ===
Lindau does not have its own airport. However, it is close to Friedrichshafen Airport and Memmingen Airport, which usually serve tourist arrivals and European destinations. The nearest major airports are Munich Airport, Stuttgart Airport, or Zurich Airport. St. Gallen Altenrhein Airport is a minor airport on the opposite side of the lake.

== Utilities ==
Lindau's local utility provider is called Stadtwerke Lindau, which provides electricity, water, telecommunications, public baths, and some other services to Lindau.

== Telecommunications ==
The local utility provider Stadtwerke TK-Lindau started deploying fibre-optic internet to major businesses and new housing development areas. Other networks include cable television by Kabel Deutschland, which is available in some streets and xDSL, by many providers. Some systems have seen upgrades of the ADSL standard in the last years to cope with the high bandwidth demand. There are plans to deploy a WiFi hotspot network (or WLAN, as it is more commonly known in German) across the Island of Lindau.

== Property, redevelopment, and other major projects ==
Lindau is currently planning several redevelopment projects across the city. The following is a list of projects that are planned for redevelopment.

- New train station – Lindau has been planning a new train station for many years. Currently there is agreement between the major stakeholders to build a new station near the shopping mall Lindaupark (Reutin district) and refurbish the station on the island. Both stations will remain active.
- Electrification of the train tracks to Munich (connecting Munich and Zurich) – this major project is sponsored by large external stakeholders such as the State of Bavaria, Switzerland, and Deutsche Bahn.
- Lindau Inselhalle – Lindau's main hall, which is used for conferences is due to be rebuilt soon.
- Multi-storey car park – related to the redevelopment of Lindau Inselhalle on the island
- Property developments near the train station on the island are planned, after rail tracks have been removed
- A new fire station was completed in September 2014 near Auenstraße (outside the island) – a major headquarters for all the former stations across town, including the Technisches Hilfswerk (THW) unit of Lindau.
- Property developments connected to the area that belongs to Deutsche Bahn near Reutin, once the new train station is completed
- Property developments in Aeschach district – including some major buildings, including luxury apartments and offices
- Railway underpass near the entrance of the island – Lindau is planning two railway underpasses for cars to ease congestion, partly caused by tourists visiting by car, causing frequent crossing closures
- Several company extensions or relocations are planned – as of September 2014, Continental AG is extending into a third office complex
- Lindau Utility is deploying optical broadband across the city
- Lindau Strandbad, the major public bath, is in discussion of being refurbished

== Local news sources ==
Lindau has a well established newspaper called Lindauer Zeitung, which is part of the Schwäbische Zeitung, which is released daily. Another newspaper is the Bürgerzeitung Lindau (BZ), which is published by the city council. It is released biweekly and contains announcements for the town by the mayor and local news. The paper is free, sponsored by advertisements, and can usually be found in shops. Both newspapers are available in print and online.

== Schools and kindergartens ==
Lindau has two main high schools: Bodensee-Gymnasium and Valentin-Heider-Gymnasium. With one middle school for girls (Maria-Ward-Realschule Lindau) and one middle school for boys (Staatliche Realschule für Knaben Lindau), there are several primary schools across the town. Lindau recently completed construction of a new Kindergarten, which also included a Kita Kindertagestätte, which is a baby nursery for children aged 2–3. There is high demand for childcare in Lindau and providers are obliged by the State of Bavaria to provide for every child.

== Hospitals, civic offices ==
- Asklepios Krankenhaus Lindau
- Bürgerbüro Lindau, the local office for all legal matters, e.g. passports, registration, etc.
- KFZ-Zulassungsstelle, registration office for cars
- Finanzamt (tax office), location in Lindau

== Shopping ==
Lindau's large shopping centres and supermarkets such as Aldi, Lidl, and REWE are off Lindau Island. However, the Island has many different shops that sell clothing, cosmetics, gifts, toys, antiques, and local products such as cheese and wine.

Lindau's main shopping mall is called Lindaupark and hosts 40 shops for trendy fashion, jewellery and watches, as well as books and electronics. Lindaupark complements the shopping experience with restaurants and cafes. The pedestrian zone Lindaus Maximilianstraße is on the island, noted for its beauty, with shops selling handmade jewellery made of Lake Constance stones and antiques.

== Festivals and events ==
Thanks to its location on Lake Constance, Lindau hosts a number of festivals and events, usually in summer (between May and August).

- U&D, Umsonst & Draussen by Club Vaudeville Lindau. The festival hosts live music in a public area.
- Nobel Laureate Meetings at Lindau, Lindau's prestigious science event. Students from all over the world are able to meet up with Nobel laureates to discuss scientific developments. Lindau is soon to build a new conference home for this event.
- Psychotherapiewochen, a psychologist conference
- Rund Um den Bodensee, a sailing competition
- Gartentage 2014
- Lindauer Oktoberfest
- Lindauer Kinderfest

== Notable people ==
- Achilles Gasser, also Gasserus (1505–1577), physician and historian
- Jacob Ernst Thomann von Hagelstein (1588–1653), painter
- Johann Jacob Heber (1666–1727), surveyor and geometrician
- Richard Z. Johnson, American attorney and politician (died in Lindau)
- Janina Minge (born 1999), footballer
- John Spilman (died 1626), paper manufacturer and jeweler in England
- Rudi Spring (1962–2025), composer, pianist and academic
- Florian Fricke (1944-2001), musician, pianist, composer

== Genealogy ==
Lindau is believed to be the origin of the Lindauer surname of Germany, Switzerland, Alsace-Lorraine, Austria and the Czech Republic. A Jewish family bearing this name is said to have descended from Suskind of Lindau, who was among those killed during the pogrom of 1430.

Lindauer is also the name of a famous wine brand from New Zealand. However, there is no established relationship between Lindau and the wine, which is named after painter Gottfried Lindauer.

== Gastronomy ==
Lindau produces a number of local wines and beverages. There are a number of localities that produce wines (Rädlewirtschaften) from local vineyards and Schnapps made by local farmers.

== Climate ==
Lindau is located in a temperate climatic zone (experiencing four distinct seasons) with mountain surroundings and the freshwater lake. Winters can be cold, with temperatures reaching as low as −20 °C on occasion. In some exceptional cases, winters can be so severely cold that major parts of the lake freeze, making crossing of the lake by car possible, however this is a once in 50- to 100-year event. Summers are normally warm to hot and usually humid due to the surrounding lake.

Heavy storms, rain showers, and thunderstorms are common in summer and heavy winds up to 8 on the Beaufort scale are possible. Usually, the lake is calm; however, there is a warning-light system for boats to indicate if heavy storms are forecast. Due to the surrounding mountains, snow is always in sight and a good indicator of weather. Lake Constance is located at roughly 400m meters above sea level.

== Twin towns ==
Lindau is twinned with:

- Serpukhov (Russia)
- Chelles (France) Lindau was twinned in 1964 with the City of Chelles in France, which was initiated by the returned French soldiers after World War II.
- Reitnau (Switzerland)
