= Lundy (disambiguation) =

Lundy is an island in the Bristol Channel of Great Britain.

Lundy may also refer to:

== Places ==
- Lundy, a sea area in the British Shipping Forecast
- Lundy, California, a town in the US
- Lundy, Missouri, an unincorporated community in the US
- Lundy, Nova Scotia, Canada
- Lundy's Lane, an urban highway in Niagara Falls, Ontario, Canada
- 100604 Lundy, an asteroid

=== Buildings ===
- Ralph Lundy Field, Patriots Point Soccer Complex, Mount Pleasant, South Carolina, US
- Benjamin Lundy House, Mount Pleasant, Ohio, US
- Lundy's Restaurant, a former seafood restaurant founded by the Lundy family in Brooklyn, NY, US

== Biology ==
- Lundy cabbage, a species of primitive brassicoid, endemic to Lundy
- Lundy cabbage flea beetle, a species of flea beetle endemic to Lundy
- Lundy Pony, a breed of pony bred on Lundy

== People ==
- Lundy (surname)
  - Lundy, the family of the 2000 Lundy murders
  - Hok Lundy (1950–2008) Cambodian police officer
- Lundy (given name)
  - Lundy Braun
  - Lundy Kiger
  - Lundy Siegriest

== Other uses ==
- MV Empire Lundy, a WWII British Empire Ship
- Lundy 500, an event set up by the Salient magazine, to reenact the drive from the Lundy murders
- Lundy's Day, also known as Shutting of the Gates, an annual Apprentice Boys of Derry parade

== See also ==
- Lundys Corners, Ontario, Canada
- Ranier-Lundy Racing, US stock car racing team
- Lundy-Kotula, an aircraft brand
- Lundey (disambiguation), the name of three Icelandic islands
- Lindy (disambiguation)
- Lunde (disambiguation)
