= Weidenthal station =

Railway station in Germany

Weidenthal
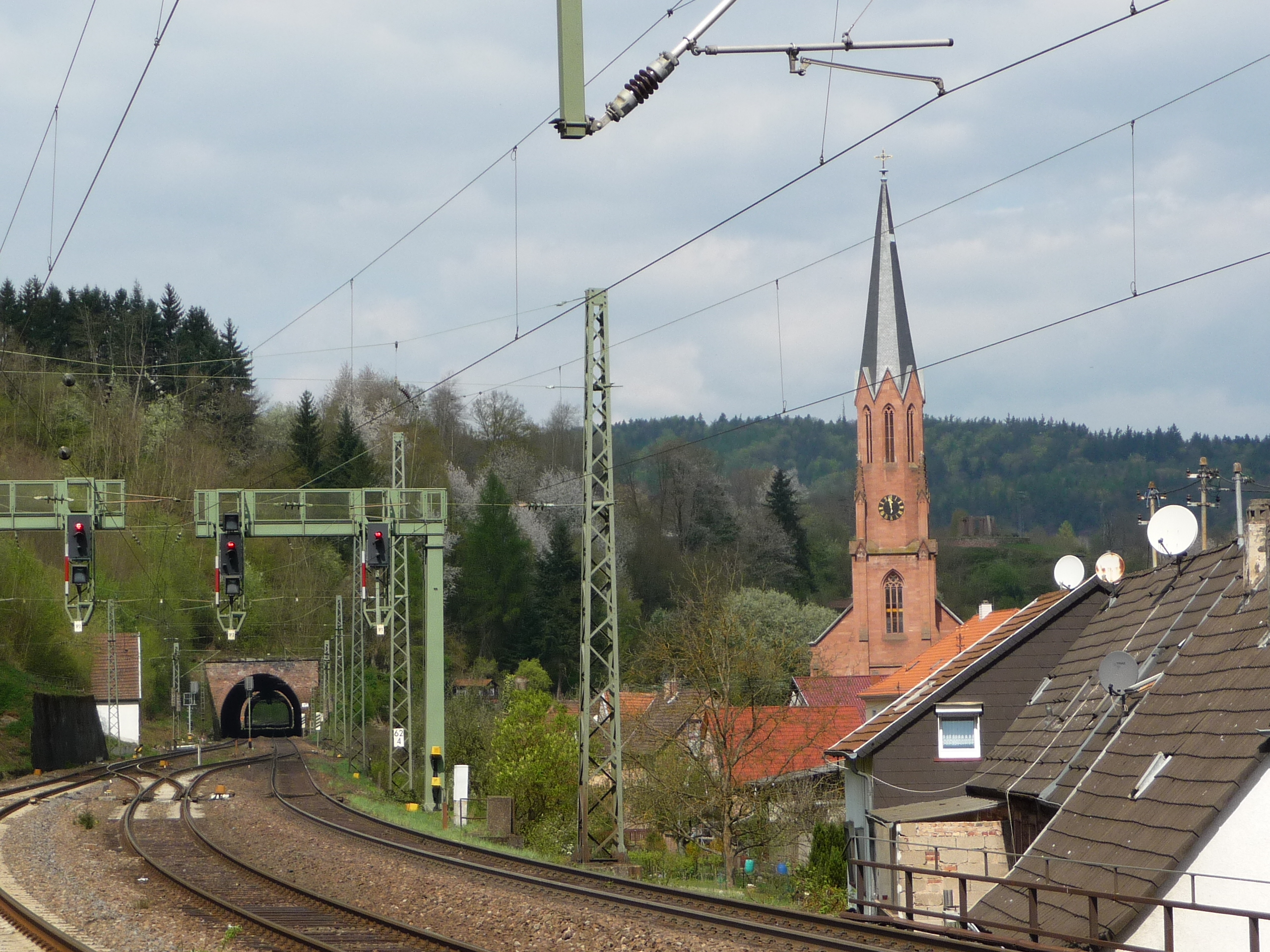
- Northern end of the station, with the Gipp Tunnel in the background

General information
- Location: Sensentalstr.1, Weidenthal, Rhineland-Palatinate; Germany
- Coordinates: 49°25′03″N 7°59′40″E
- Lines: Mannheim–Saarbrücken (km 62.6) (KBS 670)
- Platforms: 2

Construction
- Accessible: Yes
- Architectural style: Neoclassical

Other information
- Station code: 7083
- DS100 code: RWD
- IBNR: 8006261
- Category: 5
- Fare zone: VRN: 111
- Website: www.bahnhof.de

History
- Opened: 25 August 1849
Location

Weidenthal station is the station of the town of Weidenthal in the German state of Rhineland-Palatinate. It lies on the Mannheim–Saarbrücken railway, which essentially consists of the Pfälzischen Ludwigsbahn (Palatine Ludwig Railway), which historically connected Ludwigshafen and Bexbach. It was opened on 25 August 1849, with the Kaiserslautern–Frankenstein section of the Ludwig Railway. Its entrance building is a protected monument.

With the opening of the Rhine-Neckar S-Bahn in December 2003, the former passenger facilities were abandoned and new ones were opened in the northern area of the station. It is located in the network area of the Verkehrsverbund Rhein-Neckar (Rhine-Neckar transport association, VRN) and belongs to fare zone 111.

== Location ==
The station is located on the south-eastern edge of Weidenthal. It comprises three tracks and is 800 metres long. The former entrance building including the former platforms are located on Bahnhofstraße (station street). The current station is located about 800 metres further north at the street of Sensental (Sensen valley). The main line from Mannheim to Saarbrücken runs in the area of the station from south-east to west-northwest. The tracks are almost parallel to Bundesstraße 39 (federal highway 39) and the Hochspeyerbach stream. Directly north of the station is the Gipp Tunnel. The former entrance building is located at line-kilometre 63.4 and the current station is at line-kilometre 62.7.

== History ==
Originally the site was to be in the area of the Sens valley before it was decided to build it further south. The opening of the last part of the line through difficult terrain finally took place on 25 August 1849. Weidenthal station, along with Lambrecht station, was one of two intermediate stations on the newly opened section of line. At the beginning of the twentieth century, the station had ticket gates like other stations in the Palatinate. During this time, the station was managed by the operations and construction inspectorate (Betriebs- und Bauinspektion) of Neustadt an der Haardt and was part of the responsibility of the Bahnmeisterei Lambrecht (office of the track master of Lambrecht).

In 1922, the station was integrated into the new Reichsbahndirektion Ludwigshafen (railway division of Ludwigshafen). During the dissolution of the railway division of Ludwigshafen on 1 April 1937, it was transferred to the railway division of Mainz. In 1922, the station was integrated into the new Reichsbahndirektion Ludwigshafen (railway division of Ludwigshafen). A year later, the railway workers employed at the railway station were expelled during the operation of the railway by the French military during the occupation of the Palatinate by France. They then returned to work.

Deutsche Bundesbahn (DB), which was responsible for railway operation from 1949, transferred the station to the Bundesbahndirektion Mainz (Bundesbahn railway division of Mainz), which was assigned all railway lines within the newly created state of Rhineland-Palatinate. It became a part of the railway division of Karlsruhe with the dissolution of the railway division of Mainz on 1 August 1971. At the same time the platforms were raised. During the planning of the Rhine-Neckar S-Bahn, it was planned to integrate the line initially to Kaiserslautern and later to Homburg into this local transport network. Since the station was far from the town centre, new platforms were built in the northern railway station area, starting in 1998, and they were opened at the end of 2003 with the commencement of S-Bahn operations to Kaiserslautern.

== Operations ==
=== Passengers ===
In 1865, there were three train pairs on the Worms–Neunkirchen route. In 1884, local trains ran primarily on the Neunkirchen–Worms route. In addition there were trains, which ran only on part of the line such as Neustadt–Kaiserslautern and Kaiserslautern–Worms. Some did not stop at all stations, and Weidenthal was not served by all local trains.

In the summer of 1914, the trains on the Alsenz Valley Railway (Alsenztalbahn) ran on the Bad Münster–Neustadt route, requiring a reversal in Hochspeyer station with the locomotive running around the train, and also stopping in Weidenthal. During the First World War and the inter-war period, local transport was largely limited to the Neustadt–Kaiserslautern route. In the middle of the Second World War, most local services on the Mannheim–Saarbrücken railway ran only on sections of the line. As a rule, they ran as far west as Homburg at the most. In the post-war period, services were largely limited to the Neustadt–Kaiserslautern section. From 1991, trains on the Trier–Offenburg route stopped at all stations to the east of Kaiserslautern and thus also in Frankenstein. A few years later the Homburg–Neckarelz route was added, continuing to Osterburken or Heilbronn. From 2001 onwards the trains that previously ran to Offenburg, largely ran only as far as Karlsruhe.

Trains services in the 2017 timetable
Train type	Route	Interval
S1	Homburg (Saar) – Kaiserslautern – Hochspeyer – Frankenstein (Pfalz) – Neustadt (Weinstr) – Mannheim – Heidelberg – Eberbach – Mosbach (Baden) –Osterburken	Hourly
S2	Kaiserslautern – Hochspeyer – Frankenstein (Pfalz) – Neustadt (Weinstr) – Mannheim – Heidelberg – Eberbach – Mosbach (Baden)	Hourly

=== Freight ===
Like all stations along the Ludwig Railway at that time, the station had facilities for handling freight. The local stone quarry was an important freight customer with its own connecting tracks. Grindstones and millstones were produced and loaded on them. In 1871, the normal freight trains on the Ludwig Railway on the Kaiserslautern–Mainz, Homburg–Frankenthal, Ludwigshafen–Neunkirchen, Worms–Homburg routes stopped at the station for between three and five minutes. In addition there was a stone train on the Kaiserslautern–Ludwigshafen route, which stopped at the station for a total of 15 minutes.

From the 1980s onwards Übergabezüge (goods exchange trains) served the station. It was based in Neustadter Hauptbahnhof. At the present time, the connecting track from Weidenthal station is used by the Feinpapierfabrik Glatz paper factory in nearby Neidenfels.

== Infrastructure and track layout ==
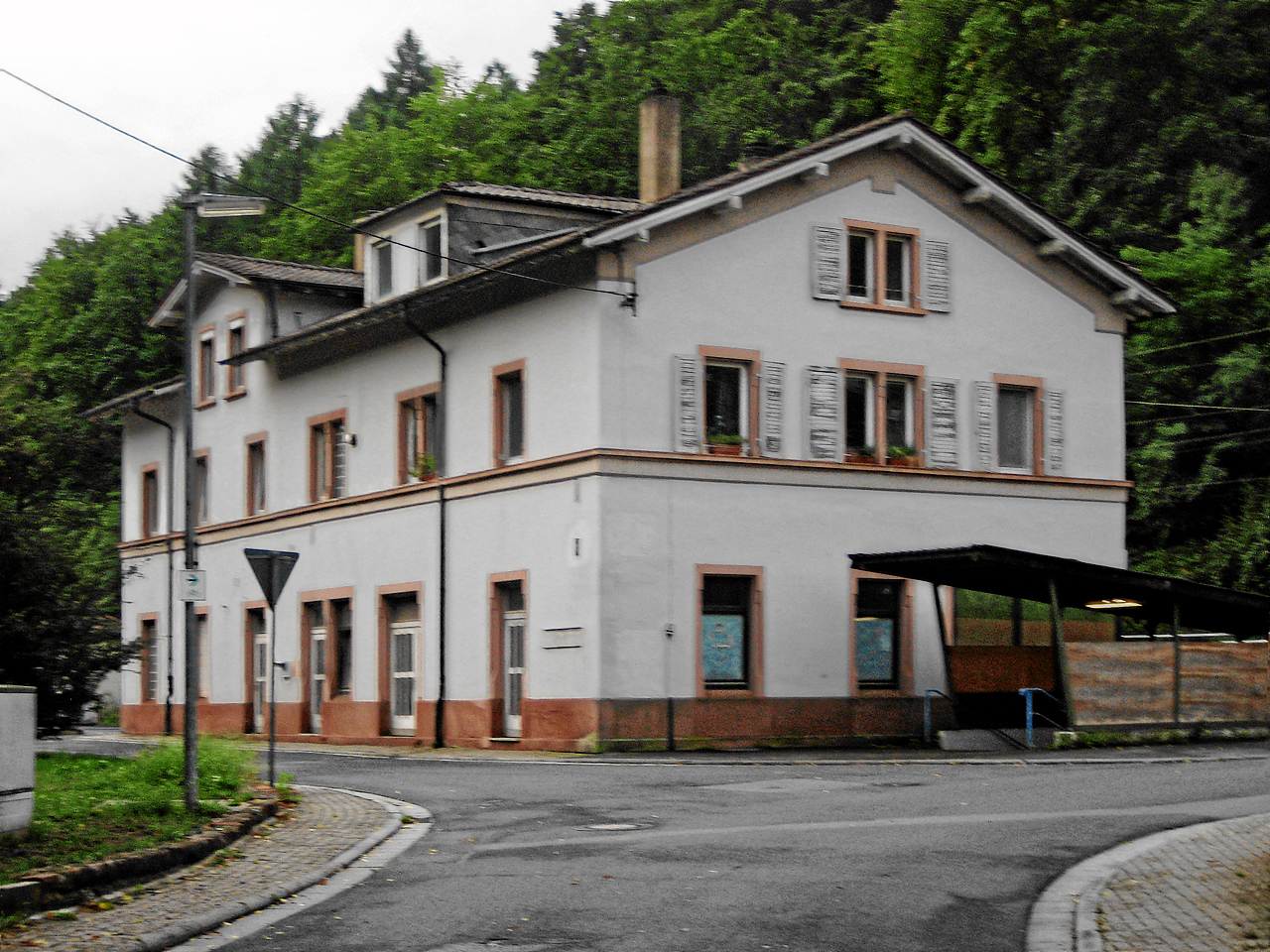
Former entrance building of Weidenthal station; the pedestrian subway is in the foreground

The former entrance building was built in 1848 and 1849 in the Neoclassical style. It was expanded in 1896. There is a memorial stone dedicated to the House of Wittelsbach on the station forecourt. It consists of an iron plate and was erected in 1880. The entrance building and the memorial stone are both classified as historical monuments. The station itself was previously controlled by a Siemens press button relay interlocking without automatic route-setting, which is now out of operation.

The station itself currently (2013) has three railway tracks, the middle one of which is an overtaking track. As a result, it is one of a total of three places where trains can overtake between Neustadt and Kaiserslautern. The two outer tracks – designated as track 1 and 2 – have an outside platform. At the south-east end, there is also a non-electrified siding, designated as track 4. Freight transport facilities are no longer available. In both directions, the maximum speed allowed in the station area is 90 kilometres per hour.
