= David Lindberg =

David Lindberg may refer to:

- David C. Lindberg (1935–2015), American historian of science
- David R. Lindberg (born 1948), American malacologist

== See also ==
- Lindberg (disambiguation)
