= Lunde =

Lunde may refer to:

== People ==
=== Politics ===
- Gulbrand Lunde (1901–1942), Norwegian councillor of state in the Nasjonal Samling government
- Heidi Nordby Lunde (born 1973), Norwegian politician for the Conservative Party
- Jens Lunde (1884–1974), Norwegian politician for the Farmers' Party
- Karl Lunde (1892–1975), Norwegian politician for the Liberal Party
- Kjellbjørg Lunde (born 1944), Norwegian politician for the Socialist Left Party

=== Sport ===
==== Sailors ====
- Eugen Lunde (1887–1963), Norwegian sailor who competed in the 1924 Summer Olympics
- Jeanette Lunde (born 1972), Norwegian sportsperson who competed in alpine skiing and sailing
- Peder Lunde Jr. born 1942), Norwegian sailor and Olympic champion
- Peder Lunde Sr. (1918–2009), Norwegian sailor and Olympic medalist
- Vibeke Lunde (1921–1962), Norwegian sailor and Olympic medalist

==== Other sports ====
- Bill Lunde (born 1975), American golfer
- Bjarte Lunde Aarsheim (born 1975), Norwegian footballer
- Jeanette Lunde (born 1972), Norwegian alpine skier and sailor
- Katrine Lunde Haraldsen (born 1980), Norwegian team handball goalkeeper
- Knut Lunde (1905–1960), Norwegian Nordic combined skier
- Lars Lunde (born 1964), Danish football player
- Len Lunde (1936–2010), Canadian ice hockey player
- Martin Lunde (born 1958), American wrestler better known as Arn Anderson
- Nordal Lunde (1875–1942), Norwegian sports shooter
- Siv Bråten Lunde (born 1960), Norwegian biathlete

=== Other fields ===
- Anders Christian Lunde (1809–1886), Danish landscape painter
- Barbara Kegerreis Lunde (born 1937), American physicist
- Einar Lunde (born 1943), Norwegian news anchor
- Ivar Lunde (1908–1992), Norwegian diplomat
- John Arthur Lunde (born 1948), Norwegian civil servant
- Ken Lunde (born 1965), American linguists specialist
- Maja Lunde (born 1975), Norwegian writer
- Niels Lunde (born 1962), Danish writer and columnist on business and economical issues
- Reidar Lunde (1911–1982), Norwegian newspaper editor
- Sigurd Lunde (architect) (1874–1936), Norwegian architect
- Sigurd Lunde (bishop) (1916–2006), Norwegian theologian, teacher, author, broadcaster, and Bishop of Stavanger
- Stein Erik Lunde (born 1953), Norwegian novelist, children's writer, biographer and textbook writer
- Tormod Lunde (born 1954), Norwegian sociologist
- Øivind Lunde (born 1962), Norwegian bass guitarist
- Øyvind Hegg-Lunde (born 1982), Norwegian musician (drums and percussion)

== Places ==
=== Antarctica ===
- Lunde Glacier, a Norwegian Antarctic territory
- Mount Lunde, a mountain ridge in the Tula Mountains, Enderby Land, Antarctica

=== Denmark ===
- Lunde, a parish in Nordfyn Municipality in the Region of Southern Denmark
- Lunde railway station, Denmark, in West Jutland

=== Norway ===
- Lunde, Kristiansand, a village in Kristiansand Municipality in Agder county
- Lunde, Sirdal (sometimes called Øvre Sirdal), a village in Sirdal Municipality in Agder county
- Lunde, Telemark, a village area in Nome Municipality in Telemark county
- Lunde Station, a station on the Sørlandet Line located in Nome Municipality in Telemark county
- Lunde Municipality (Rogaland), a former municipality in Rogaland county
- Lunde Municipality (Telemark), a former municipality in Telemark county

=== Sweden ===
- Lunde, Sweden, a locality situated in the Municipality of Kramfors, Västernorrland County

== Other uses ==
- Lunde, the Norwegian name for the Atlantic puffin
- Lunde Formation, a geologic formation in Norway
