= Neidenfels =

- Municipality
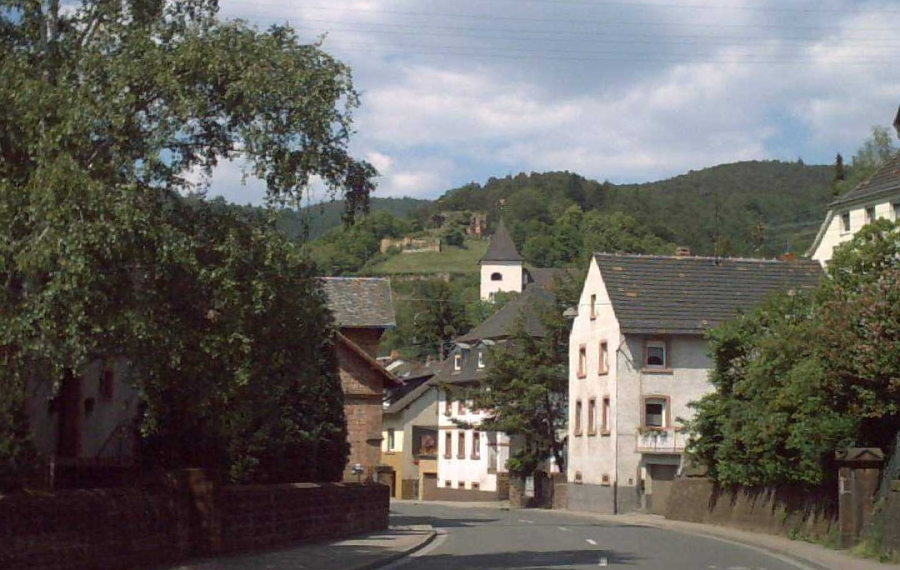
- Neidenfels

- Coat of arms

- Location of Neidenfels within Bad Dürkheim district
- Interactive map of Neidenfels
- Location within Germany Location within Rhineland-Palatinate
- Coordinates: 49°23′20″N 8°02′47″E
- Country: Germany
- State: Rhineland-Palatinate
- District: Bad Dürkheim
- Municipal assoc.: Lambrecht (Pfalz)

Government
  - Mayor (2019–24): Sybille Höchel (CDU)

Area
  - Total: 6.65 km^{2} (2.57 sq mi)
- Elevation: 434 m (1,424 ft)

Population (2025-12-31)
  - Total: 779
  - Density: 117/km^{2} (303/sq mi)
- Time zone: UTC+01:00 (CET)
  - Summer (DST): UTC+02:00 (CEST)
- Postal codes: 67468
- Dialling codes: 06325
- Vehicle registration: DÜW
- Website: www.neidenfels.de

Neidenfels is an Ortsgemeinde – a municipality belonging to a Verbandsgemeinde, a kind of collective municipality – in the Bad Dürkheim district in Rhineland-Palatinate, Germany.

== Geography ==
=== Location ===
The municipality, a papermaking village in the middle of the Palatinate Forest, lies between Neustadt an der Weinstraße und Kaiserslautern. It belongs to the Verbandsgemeinde of Lambrecht, whose seat is in the like-named town.

== History ==
Neidenfels came into being in the early 15th century in the protection of Niedenfels Castle, which sometime came to be called Neidenfels. The castle itself dated back to 1330 when it was built by Count Palatine Rudolf II.

=== Religion ===
In 2007, 41.8% of the inhabitants were Evangelical and 41.3% Catholic. The rest belonged to other faiths or adhered to none.

== Politics ==
=== Town council ===
The council is made up of 12 council members, who were elected at the municipal election held on 7 June 2009, and the honorary mayor as chairman.

The municipal election held on 7 June 2009 yielded the following results:

	SPD	CDU	Total
2009	5	7	12 seats
2004	7	5	12 seats

=== Coat of arms ===
The German blazon reads: In Rot ein steinernes silbernes Haus in Vorderansicht mit Treppengiebel.

The municipality's arms might in English heraldic language be described thus: Gules a stone house gable affronty argent with a crow-stepped gable.

The arms were approved in 1971 by the now abolished Regierungsbezirk administration in Neustadt. The one charge is canting for an old noble family's name, Steinhausen von Neidenstein (Stein is “stone” in German and Haus is “house”).

== Culture and sightseeing ==
=== Buildings ===
Above the village stands Neidenfels Castle, a ruin from the 14th century. In the village itself is a papermill.

Near Neidenfels lies the Drachenfels rocky plateau, which can be reached from Neidenfels over hiking trails.

== Economy and infrastructure ==
=== Transport ===
Stopping at Neidenfels railway station are RheinNeckar S-Bahn trains on the Saarbrücken–Mannheim line. Lines S1 and S2 afford direct links to Kaiserslautern in the west and Ludwigshafen, Mannheim and Heidelberg in the east. Public transport is integrated into the VRN, whose fares therefore apply.
