= Lindau Lighthouse =

Lighthouse in Germany

Lindau Lighthouse Westmole
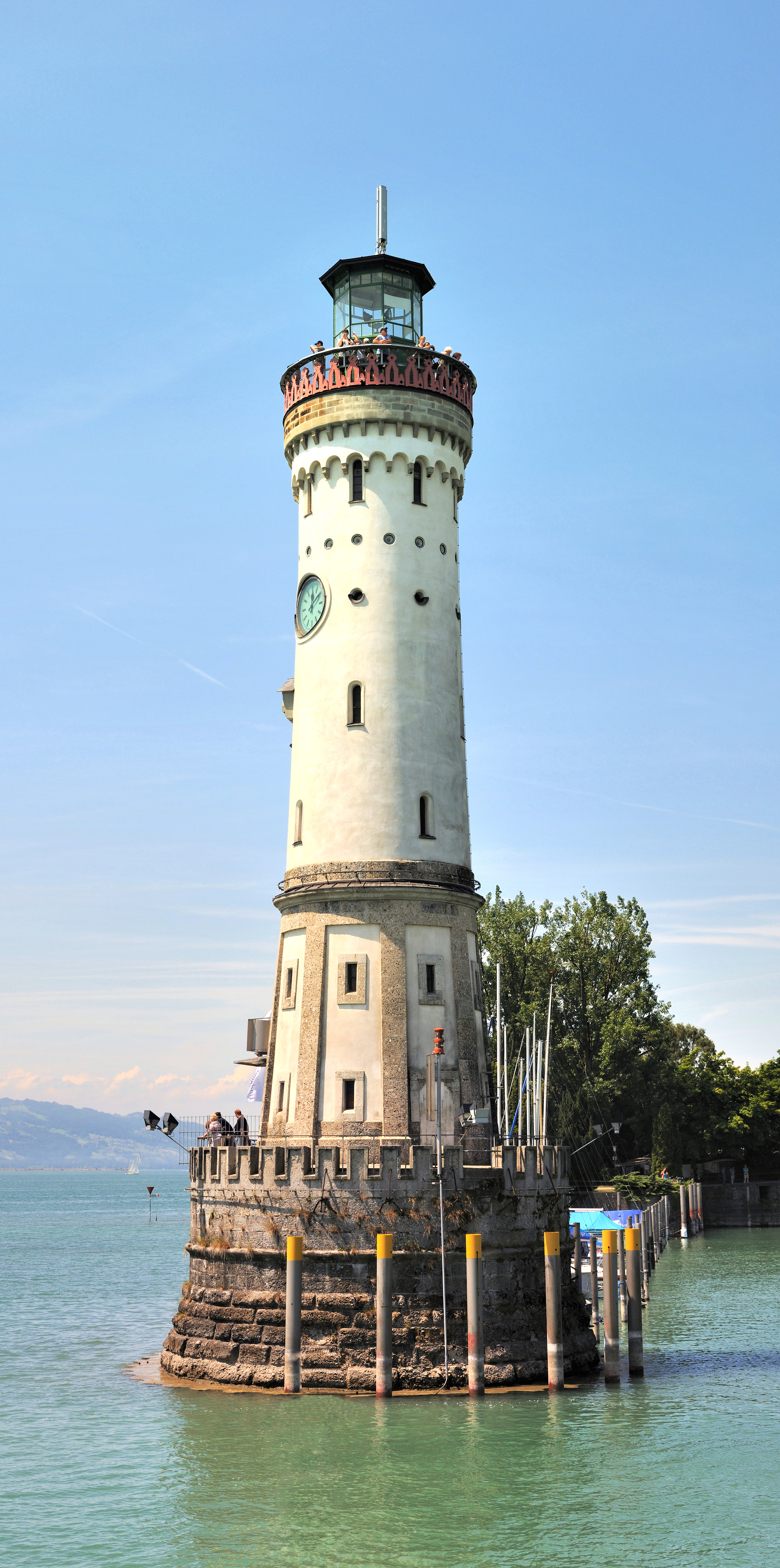
- Location: Lindau, Lake Constance; Germany
- Coordinates: 47°32′34.7″N 9°41′0.9″E

Tower
- Constructed: 1856
- Construction: stone tower
- Automated: early 1990s
- Height: 33 metres (108 ft)
- Shape: cylindrical tower with balcony and lantern
- Markings: white tower, green lantern, red balcony rail
- Operator: City of Lindau

Light
- Focal height: 35 metres (115 ft)
- Lens: rotator with 2 parabolic reflectors
- Characteristic: Fl 3s.

The Lindau Lighthouse (German: Lindauer Leuchtturm) is a lighthouse in Lindau, on Lake Constance. It is the southernmost lighthouse in Germany, and the only lighthouse in Bavaria. It is 33 metres (108 ft) tall and has a circumference of 24 metres (79 ft) at its base. Notably, it has a clock in its facade.

== History ==
The lighthouse was built from 1853 to 1856 at the western mole in the entrance to the harbour of Lindau and was first lit on 4 October 1856. It succeeded the light station in the Mangturm tower of 1230.

== Light and optics ==
During the first years of operation, the light was created by an open oil fire. At that time the keeper would have to keep the fire burning steadily in great pans and operate a bell and foghorn. The firing was later converted to kerosene and then gas.

Since 1936 the tower has been operated electrically and was automated in the early 1990s. The light is lit on demand by ships using radio signals.

The light characteristic is one flash every three seconds, which is created by two rotating parabolic reflectors.

== Current situation ==
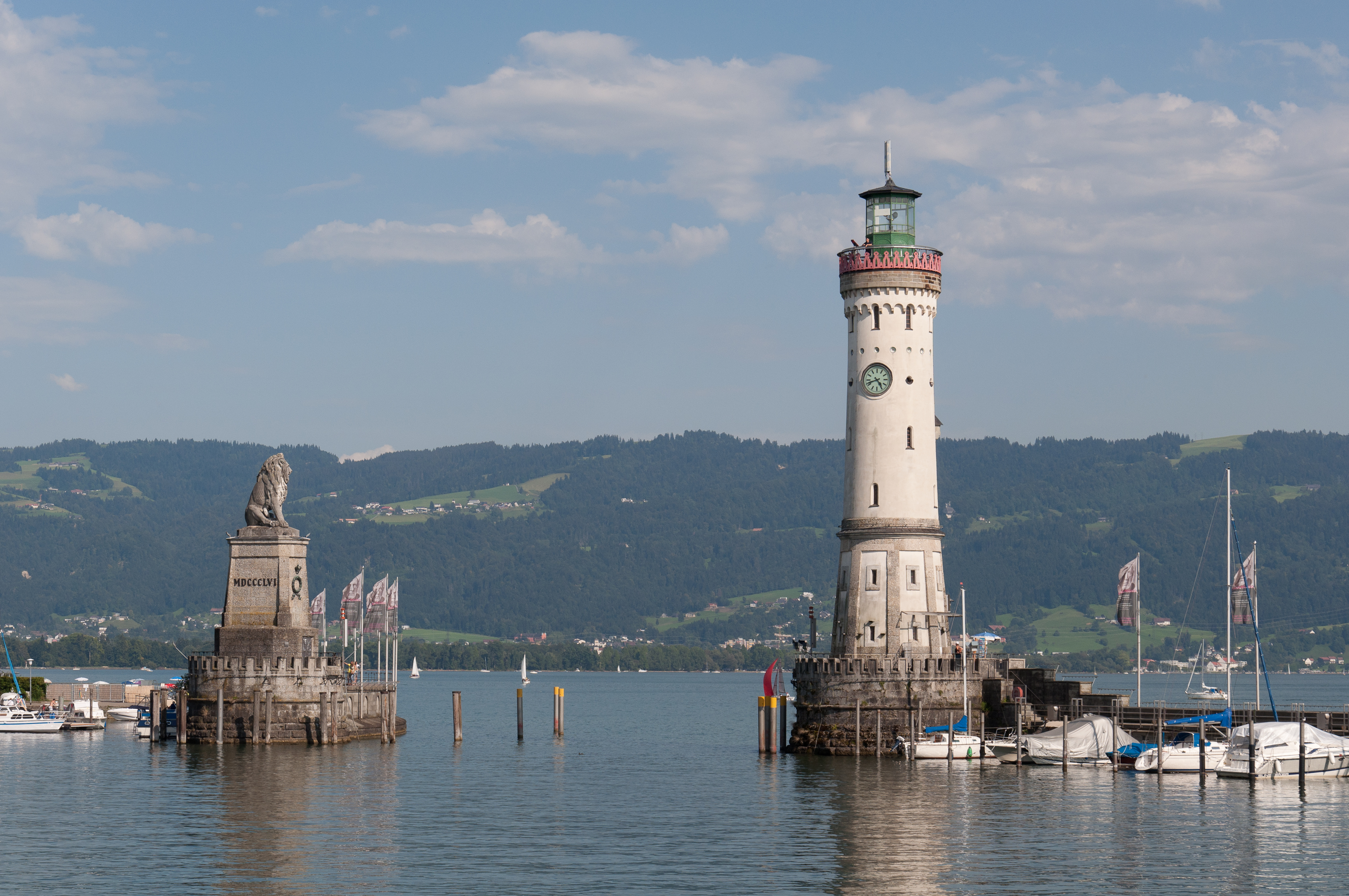
The lighthouse together with the "Bavarian Lion"

The lighthouse and the entire port of Lindau were originally built for the Ludwig South-North Railway of the Royal Bavarian State Railways and later used to be operated by the shipping department for Lake Constance of Deutsche Bahn. Eventually the port was sold to the city works of Constance in 2002 together with the Bodensee-Schiffsbetriebe GmbH shipping company. After several years of negotiations, the port area and thus the lighthouse was transferred to the town of Lindau in April 2010. It is open to visitors who may find information on local fauna and flora and on Lake Constance shipping.

The lighthouse is a popular subject for photographs (from the north side of the harbour together with the "Bavarian Lion" on the other side of the harbour entrance).

== See also ==
- List of lighthouses and lightvessels in Germany
