= Lunday =

Lunday is a surname, a variant spelling of Irish and Scottish Lundy. Notable people with the surname include:

- Ken Lunday (1912–2005), American football player
- Kevin Lunday (born 1965), U.S. Coast Guard admiral
