= Lundey =

Lundey may refer to:

== Islands in Iceland ==
- Lundey, Faxaflói, near Reykjavík, southwestern Iceland
- Lundey, Skagafjörður, in Skagafjörður fjord, northwestern Iceland
- Lundey, Skjálfandi, in northeastern Iceland

== See also ==
- Lundy (disambiguation)
