= Mini Lindy =

Mini Lindy was a line of small plastic model kits, about the size of Matchbox or Hot Wheels cars. They were part of the "Lindberg Line". They had rubber tires, chrome wheels and clear windshields. The axles were fit under a plastic tab that provided limited suspension actions. Some of the subjects are difficult to find under other formats, such as Hot Wheels. These are often mistaken for Hot Wheels or slot cars, and are fairly rare, but can be found on eBay and websites.

Some of the car subjects:

- Porsche Carrera
- Ford Pickup
- Corvette Stingray
- Jaguar XKE
- Ford Mustang (1968)
- Jeep Jeepster (1968) with CJ grille
- Volkswagen Camper
- Chevy Van (Flat windshield)
- Chevrolet Camaro (1968)
- Fire Engine
- Dump Truck (GMC)
- Greyhound Bus
- Mail Truck
- Cement Truck
- Cement Mixer
- MG-TD Sports Car
- Tow Truck
- Austin-Healey 3000
- Volkswagen Beetle
- Mercedes SSK
- 1930 Packard
- Ford Camper
- School Bus
- Tractor Trailer
- Ford GT
- Porsche Targa
- Ford Maverick (1970 2 dr)
- AMC AMX
- Ford Cobra
- Dodge Charger
- Dune Buggy
- Ryder Truck
- Cadillac Eldorado
- Continental Mark III
- Chevrolet Vega
- Buick Riviera (1971)
- Pontiac Grand Prix
- Chevrolet Corvette (1970)
- AMC Gremlin
- Chevrolet Monte Carlo

The last 8 were part of the Lindberg "Super Sport" series.
