= Laura Lundy =

Professor of Children's Rights at Queen's University Belfast

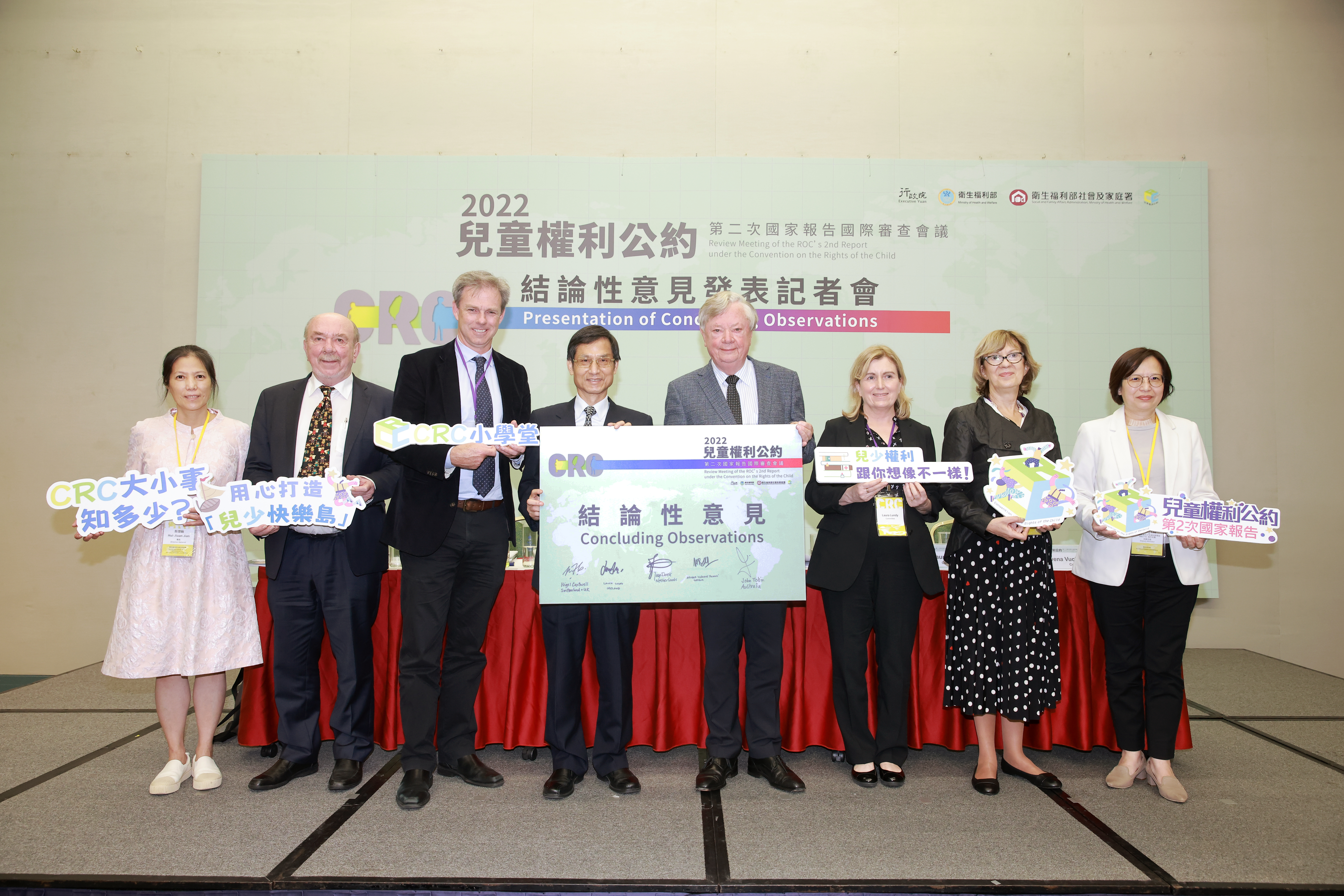
Laura Lundy (2nd from right) at the Convention of the Rights of the Child (2022)

Laura Lundy is Professor of Children's Rights at Queen's University Belfast and Professor of Law at University College Cork. Lundy is also Co-Director of the Centre for Children's Rights, located at Queens University Belfast in Belfast.

== Career, research and impact ==
Alongside being a professor, a trained barrister at law, Co-Director of the Centre for Children's Rights, Lundy is also joint Editor in Chief of the International Journal of Children's Rights. Her research specialises in children's education rights, rights to participate in decision-making, and the implementation of the Convention on the Rights of the Child (CRC).

Lundy's article on "'Voice' is not enough", published in 2007, is one of the most highly cited articles ever on children's rights and the model of children's participation is presents is used extensively both in practice and within scholarship.

== Notable publications ==
- "Incorporation of the United Nations Convention on the Rights of the Child in Law: A Comparative Review", International Journal of Children's Rights, 21 (3), 2013: 442-463.
- "'Voice' is not enough: conceptualising Article 12 of the United Nations Convention on the Rights of the Child". British Educational Research Journal. 33 (6), 2007: 927–942.
- "Children's rights and educational policy in Europe: the implementation of the United Nations Convention on the Rights of the Child". Oxford Review of Education. 38 (4), 2012: 393–411.

== The Lundy Model ==
Lundy also developed a model to help conceptualise a child's right to participation, as laid down in Article 12 of the UN Convention on the Rights of the Child, called the Lundy Model. It was prominently featured in the Irish Department of Children and Youth Affairs' National Strategy on Children and Young People's Participation in Decision-Making, taking place between 2015 – 2020.

== See also ==
- The International Journal of Children's Rights
