= Lindeberg =

Lindeberg may refer to:

== Places ==
- Lindeberg, Akershus, a village in Sørum municipality, Norway
  - Lindeberg Station, an Oslo Commuter Rail station
- Lindeberg, Oslo, an area of the borough Alna in Oslo, Norway
  - Lindeberg (station), an Oslo Metro station

== People ==
- Erik Lindeberg (born 1979), Swedish sprint canoer
- Harrie T. Lindeberg (1879–1959), American architect
- Jafet Lindeberg (1874–1962), Norwegian-born American gold prospector and co-founder of Nome, Alaska
- Jarl Waldemar Lindeberg (1876–1932), Finnish mathematician
- Johan Lindeberg (born 1957), Swedish fashion designer
- Linda Lindeberg (1915–1973), American painter
- Staffan Lindeberg (1950–2016), Swedish physician and professor

== Other uses ==
- J.Lindeberg, a Swedish clothing company founded by Johan Lindeberg

== See also ==
- Lindberg (disambiguation)
- Lindbergh (disambiguation)
