= Lambrecht (Verbandsgemeinde) =

- Verbandsgemeinde
- Location of Lambrecht within Bad Dürkheim district
- Interactive map of Lambrecht
- Location within Germany Location within Rhineland-Palatinate
- Coordinates: 49°22′N 8°04′E
- Country: Germany
- State: Rhineland-Palatinate
- District: Bad Dürkheim
- Seat: Lambrecht
- Subdivisions: 7 municipalities

Area
  - Total: 129.12 km^{2} (49.85 sq mi)

Population (2025-12-31)
  - Total: 12,150
  - Density: 94.10/km^{2} (243.7/sq mi)
- Time zone: UTC+01:00 (CET)
  - Summer (DST): UTC+02:00 (CEST)
- Website: www.vg-lambrecht.de

Lambrecht is a Verbandsgemeinde ("collective municipality") in the district of Bad Dürkheim, Rhineland-Palatinate, Germany. The seat of the Verbandsgemeinde is in Lambrecht.

The Verbandsgemeinde Lambrecht consists of the following Ortsgemeinden ("local municipalities"):

1. Elmstein
2. Esthal
3. Frankeneck
4. Lambrecht
5. Lindenberg
6. Neidenfels
7. Weidenthal
