= The International Journal of Children's Rights =

- Discipline: Law
- Language: English
- Edited by: Jonathan Todres and Ton Liefaard

Publication details
- History: 1993–present
- Publisher: Brill Publishers
- Frequency: Quarterly

Standard abbreviations
- ISO 4: Int. J. Child. Rights

Indexing
- ISSN: 0927-5568 (print); 1571-8182 (web)
- LCCN: 94648025

Links
- Journal homepage

The International Journal of Children's Rights is a leading academic journal relating to children's rights. It was established in 1993. Its current editors-in-chief are Jonathan Todres (Georgia State University, USA) and Ton Liefaard (Leiden University, Netherlands).

Michael Freeman (founding editor), Laura Lundy, and Helen Stalford have previously served as editor-in-chief of the Journal.
