= Niels Lunde =

Danish writer and columnist

Niels Lunde (born 31 October 1962) is a Danish writer and columnist on business and economic issues. He is now writing columns and analysis in the Danish morning daily Politiken and frequently appears on financial issues on national television broadcaster TV2 News.

== Biography ==
Niels Lunde holds a master in Political Science from the University of Aarhus and worked as a consultant for Danish Employer's Confederation 1988-94. He later became a reporter on economic issues at the Danish morning daily Berlingske Tidende in 1995. In 1998 Niels Lunde became business editor, he became editor in 1999 and 2002-2007 he was Editor-in-Chief and Director. Niels Lunde graduated in 2000 from WAN's Leaders 2000 and in 2005 from Norwegian Orkla's Senior Management Programme.

During the years 2002–2007 he headed a strategic newspaper project called “Closer to the Readers” in which the newspaper improved its financial result from a deficit of appr. 120 million DDK to a surplus of appr. 100 million DDK. In 2006 the format of the newspaper was changed from broadsheet to compact format.

In November 2006 Niels Lunde and two of the reporters of the newspaper were charged by the Danish Prosecutor with disclosing information from the Danish Defence Intelligence Service on the Iraq-war. The material disclosed information on the government's position and were confidential for reasons of national security. The case received international coverage and in December 2006 the three men were acquitted. The verdict was seen as an important milestone in the work of strengthening the freedom of the press.

Niels Lunde together with his two co-editors Mrs. Elisabeth Rühne and Mr. Lars Poulsen left Berlingske Tidende in 2007 after the newspaper was taken over by the British Mecom Group headed by Mr. David Montgomery.

== Books ==
- Wissum-sagen, 1996 (the story of the biggest financial scandal in Denmark in the 1990s).
- Nyrup (co-author Henrik Qvortrup), 1997 (a biography on the Danish prime minister Poul Nyrup Rasmussen)
- Jomsborg, 2000 (an economical thriller)
- Fra sofa til marathon, 2006 (how to run a marathon if you are a couchpotato)
- Hr. Møllers nye mand, 2008 (a biography on the CEO of A.P. Moller-Maersk, Mr. Nils Smedegaard Andersen)
