= Lindenberg, Rhineland-Palatinate =

Lindenberg
- Municipality
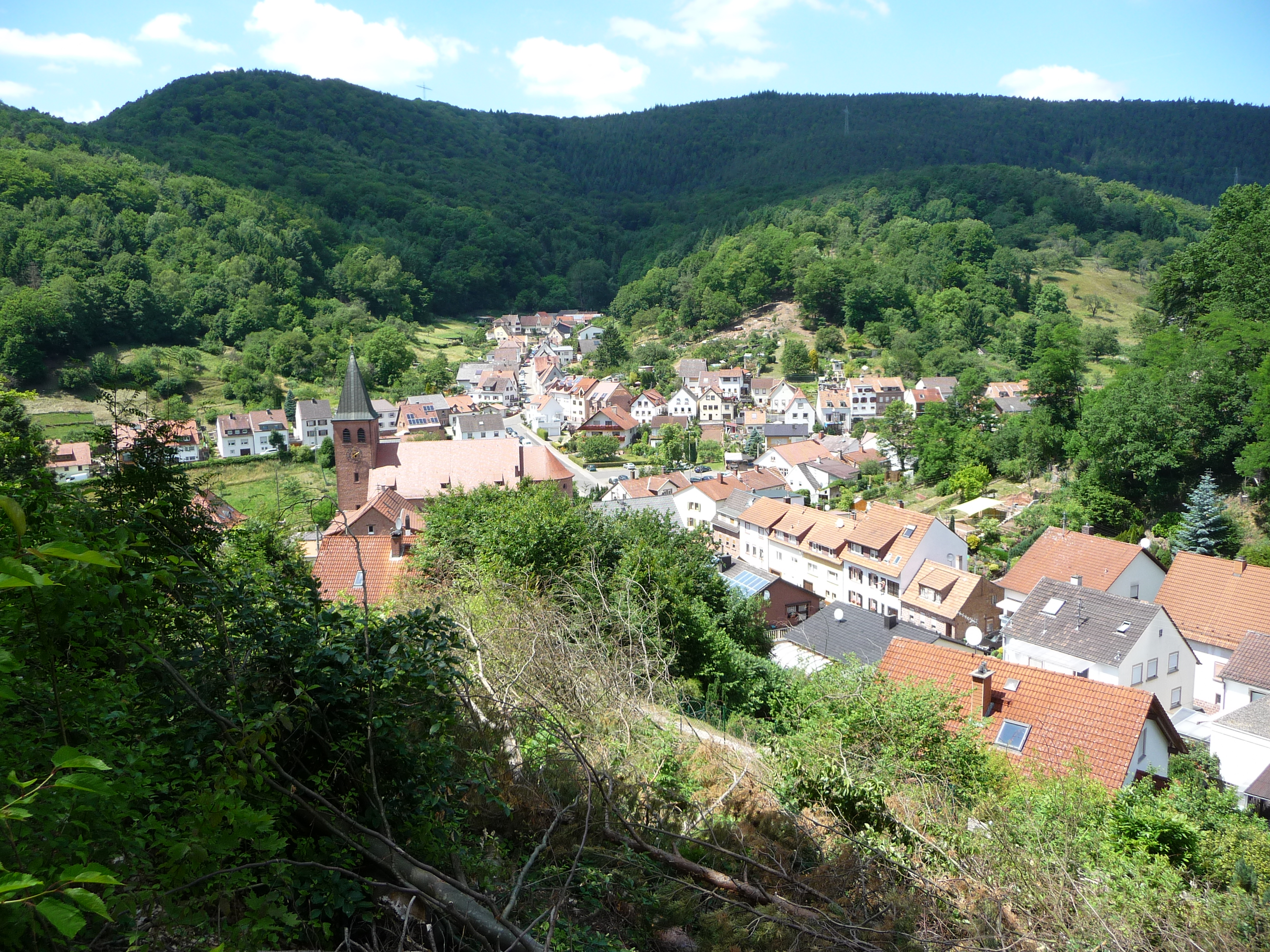
- General view of Lindenberg

- Coat of arms

- Location of Lindenberg within Bad Dürkheim district
- Interactive map of Lindenberg
- Location within Germany Location within Rhineland-Palatinate
- Coordinates: 49°22′52″N 8°05′49″E
- Country: Germany
- State: Rhineland-Palatinate
- District: Bad Dürkheim
- Municipal assoc.: Lambrecht (Pfalz)

Government
  - Mayor (2019–24): Reiner Koch (FW)

Area
  - Total: 3.79 km^{2} (1.46 sq mi)
- Elevation: 200 m (660 ft)

Population (2025-12-31)
  - Total: 1,186
  - Density: 313/km^{2} (810/sq mi)
- Time zone: UTC+01:00 (CET)
  - Summer (DST): UTC+02:00 (CEST)
- Postal codes: 67473
- Dialling codes: 06325
- Vehicle registration: DÜW
- Website: www.lindenberg-pfalz.de

Lindenberg (German pronunciation: [ˈlɪndn̩ˌbɛʁk]) is an Ortsgemeinde – a municipality belonging to a Verbandsgemeinde, a kind of collective municipality – in the Bad Dürkheim district in Rhineland-Palatinate, Germany.

== Geography ==
=== Location ===
Lindenberg belongs to the Verbandsgemeinde of Lambrecht, whose seat is in the like-named town.

== History ==
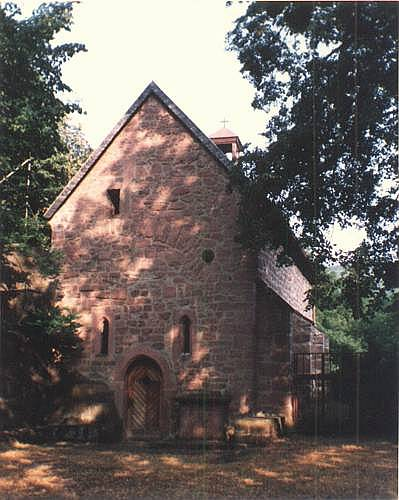
Saint Cyriacus's Chapel in the moat at Lindenberg

This “street village” – by some definitions, a “thorpe” – is believed to have arisen about 1100 from a castle that belonged to the Bishopric of Speyer. In the late 13th century, Lindenberg passed as a fief to the Lords of Frankenstein. In 1550, the castle was destroyed.

=== Religion ===
Lindenberg has an autonomous Catholic parish, to which belong both the Parish Church of Saint Mary Immaculate (Pfarrkirche St. Maria Immaculata) and Saint Cyriacus's Pilgrimage Chapel (Wallfahrtskapelle St. Cyriakus). Together with the neighbouring centre of Lambrecht there exists a Protestant parish.

In 2007, 45.6% of the inhabitants were Evangelical and 34.5% Catholic. The rest belonged to other faiths or adhered to none.

== Politics ==
=== Municipal council ===
The council is made up of 16 council members, who were elected at the municipal election held on 7 June 2009, and the honorary mayor as chairman.

The municipal election held on 7 June 2009 yielded the following results:

	SPD	CDU	FWG	WG Dietrich	Total
2009	4	7	5	-	16 seats
2004	3	8	3	2	16 seats

=== Mayor ===
The Mayor (Ortsbürgermeister) is Reiner Koch (FWG).

=== Coat of arms ===
The German blazon reads: Von Gold und Rot gespalten, rechts aus einer anstoßenden roten Zinnenmauer wachsend eine grüne Linde, deren Laub belegt ist mit einem goldenen Schild, darin eine rote Hirschstange, links der heilige Cyriacus mit goldenem Nimbus und in goldenem Ornat, in der Rechten eine grüne Traube mit zwei Blättern, in der Linken einen grünen Palmzweig haltend.

The municipality's arms might in English heraldic language be described thus: Per pale Or in base a wall masoned and embattled of three gules, issuant from the middle merlon a lime tree vert in whose crown an inescutcheon of the field charged with a stag's attire of the second, and gules Saint Cyriacus in his glory vested and crined of the first holding in his dexter hand a bunch of grapes with two leaves and in his sinister hand a palm frond, all of the third.

The arms were approved by the Interior Ministry in Mainz in 1959. The lime tree, or linden (Linde in German) is a canting charge for the municipality's name, Lindenberg. The wall represents the long-vanished castle, and the inescutcheon in the tree represents the castle's owners, the Lords of Hirschhorn (whose name meant “hart’s horn”, thus making the antler yet another canting charge). Saint Cyriacus recalls the chapel near the castle.

== Culture and sightseeing ==
=== Clubs ===
Community life is based on six secular and three denominational clubs, as well as the Lindenberg Volunteer Fire Brigade. Furthermore, there are Catholic and Evangelical women's leagues and a Catholic Elizabeth Association.

== Economy and infrastructure ==
There are in the municipality a few handicraft businesses. Also, there are two public houses and two pensions.

=== Education ===
- “St. Cyriakus” Catholic daycare centre – The centre cares for up to 45 preschool- and school-age children.
- Grundschule Lindenberg (primary school)
