= Nordal Lunde =

Norwegian sports shooter (1875–1942)

Personal information
- Born: 15 May 1875 Lillehammer, Norway
- Died: 23 November 1942 (aged 67) Oslo, Norway

Sport
- Sport: Sports shooting

Nordal Lunde (15 May 1875 – 23 November 1942) was a Norwegian sports shooter. He competed in two events at the 1920 Summer Olympics.
