= Lindberg =

Lindberg may refer to:

- Lindberg, Bavaria, a municipality in the district of Regen in Bavaria in Germany.
- Lindberg (surname)
- Lindberg, Washington, a ghost town in the United States
- Lindberg (band), Japanese pop band
- Lindberg (album)
- Lindberg (eyewear), a glasses manufacturer

== See also ==
- Lindbergh (disambiguation)
- Lindeberg (disambiguation)
- Lindenberg (disambiguation)
