= Chevrolet Corvette Stingray =

Chevrolet Corvette Stingray was the name for several model years of Chevrolet Corvettes:

- Corvette Stingray (concept car), concept cars from 1959 and 2009
- Chevrolet Corvette (C2), the second generation of the Corvette, introduced in 1963, referred to as the Corvette Sting Ray
- Chevrolet Corvette (C3), the third generation of the Corvette, introduced in 1968, referred to as the Corvette Stingray from 1969 through 1976—in 1968, the Corvette did not have the Stingray badging
- Chevrolet Corvette (C7), the seventh generation of the Corvette, introduced in 2014, referred to as the Corvette Stingray
- Chevrolet Corvette (C8), the eighth generation of the Corvette, introduced in 2020, referred to as the Corvette Stingray

== See also ==
These generations did not use the name Stingray:

- Chevrolet Corvette (C1), the first generation of the Corvette, introduced in 1953
- Chevrolet Corvette (C4), the fourth generation of the Corvette, introduced in 1984
- Chevrolet Corvette (C5), the fifth generation of the Corvette, introduced in 1997
- Chevrolet Corvette (C6), the sixth generation of the Corvette, introduced in 2005
