= Verner Lindberg =

Finnish engineer and politician

Verner Lindberg (17 August 1852 – 10 February 1909) was a Finnish politician born in Sund, Åland. He was an engineer and member of the Senate of Finland.

== Education ==
Lindberg attended the Helsinki University of Technology from 1868 to 1872 and the Polytechnic Institute 1872–1874.

== Professional life ==
From 1874 to 1878 Lindberg worked as an engineer for the national railway. He progressed through the ranks of civil engineer, starting as a junior engineer 1881–1892, senior engineer 1892–1893 and supervisor 1893–1906.

He became a senator in 1908. Lindberg was a member of the Senate Finance Committee and Maritime Administration Manager from 1908 to 1909.

== Personal life ==
Lindberg was a child of Karl Fredrik Lindberg and Johanna Margareta Öhman. In 1884, Lindberg married Emma Maria Souranderin.
