= Lucky Lindy (disambiguation) =

Lucky Lindy or Charles Lindbergh (1902–1974) was a U.S. aviator.

Lucky Lindy may also refer to:

- "Lucky Lindy!", a 1927 song by Abel Baer and L. Wolfe Gilbert
- "Lucky Lindy", a Saturday Night Live sketch featuring Land Shark
- Lucky Lindy, a racehorse and 1992 winner of the Easter Stakes

== See also ==
- Amelia Earhart (1897–1937; aka Lady Lindy), U.S. aviator
- List of people known as Lucky or the Lucky
