= Lindberg (surname) =

Lindberg is a common European surname. Literally translated it means lime or linden tree - mountain. It originally comes from villages in Germany, Austria and Switzerland and is now very common in Sweden.

== Geographical distribution ==
As of 2014, 52.9% of all known bearers of the surname Lindberg were residents of Sweden, 26.6% of the United States, 7.3% of Finland, 4.5% of Denmark, 3.4% of Norway and 1.9% of Canada.

In Sweden, the frequency of the surname was higher than national average (1:354) in the following counties:

1. Västerbotten (1:122)
2. Gävleborg (1:178)
3. Norrbotten (1:244)
4. Uppsala (1:258)
5. Västmanland (1:264)
6. Dalarna (1:293)
7. Jämtland (1:319)
8. Västernorrland (1:319)
9. Södermanland (1:347)

In Finland, the frequency of the surname was higher than national average (1:1,441) in the following regions:

1. Åland (1:336)
2. Southwest Finland (1:730)
3. Uusimaa (1:849)
4. Tavastia Proper (1:1,202)
5. Kymenlaakso (1:1,285)

In the United States, the frequency of the surname was higher than national average (1:25,889) in the following states:

1. Minnesota (1:2,886)
2. North Dakota (1:5,623)
3. Wyoming (1:7,249)
4. Washington (1:7,391)
5. Montana (1:7,443)
6. South Dakota (1:9,169)
7. Wisconsin (1:9,794)
8. Vermont (1:11,445)
9. Oregon (1:13,115)
10. Alaska (1:14,169)
11. Idaho (1:15,505)
12. Massachusetts (1:18,030)
13. Illinois (1:18,160)
14. Utah (1:18,608)
15. Rhode Island (1:18,664)
16. Kansas (1:19,262)
17. Connecticut (1:19,699)
18. Michigan (1:20,983)
19. Colorado (1:21,261)
20. Iowa (1:22,068)
21. New Hampshire (1:22,808)
22. Nebraska (1:22,893)
23. Arizona (1:23,616)
24. New Mexico (1:23,808)

== People ==
=== A–G ===
- Anna Lindberg (born 1981), Swedish diver
- Augusta Lindberg (1866–1943), Swedish actress
- Carl Lindberg (1904–1984), Danish boxer
- Chad Lindberg (born 1976), American actor
- Charles W. Lindberg (1920–2007), American Marine, one of the raisers of the U.S. flag at Iwo Jima
- Chris Lindberg (born 1967), retired Canadian ice hockey player
- Christian Lindberg (born 1958), Swedish trombonist
- Christina Lindberg (born 1950), Swedish actress and pin-up girl
- David C. Lindberg (1935–2015), American historian of science
- David R. Lindberg (born 1948), American malacologist
- Dawn Lindberg (1945–2020), South African singer and actress
- Donald A.B. Lindberg (1933–2019), American physician
- Edward Lindberg (1887–1978), American Olympic athlete
- Elsa Lindberg-Dovlette (1874–1944), Swedish writer and princess of Persia
- Göran Lindberg, convicted Swedish serial rapist
- Gunner Lindberg (born 1975), convicted American murderer

=== H–M ===
- Hanna Lindberg (1865–1951), Swedish politician, the first woman in a communal council (1910)
- Hans Lindberg (born 1981), Danish team handball player
- Helge Lindberg (1887–1928), Finnish opera singer
- Holger Lindberg (1894–1966), Swedish wrestler
- Jakob Lindberg (born 1952), Swedish lutenist
- Janne Lindberg (born 1966), Finnish former professional footballer
- Jim Lindberg (born 1968), U.S. singer-songwriter for the punk band Pennywise
- Joakim Lindberg (born 1993), Swedish canoeist
- John Lindberg (born 1959), American jazz double-bassist
- John G. Lindberg (1884–1973), Finnish ophthalmologist, discoverer of exfoliation syndrome (1917)
- Karin Lindberg (1929–2020), Swedish gymnast
- Karin Kock-Lindberg (1891–1976), Swedish politician
- Knut Lindberg (1882–1961), Swedish Olympic athlete
- Knut Lindberg (wrestler) (1880–1930), Finnish wrestler
- Kristoffer Lindberg (born 1992), Swedish politician
- Magnus Lindberg (born 1958), Finnish composer
- Marcus Lindberg (born 1980), Swedish footballer
- Marie Lindberg (cyclist) (born 1987), Swedish road cyclist
- Marie Lindberg (singer) (born 1975), Swedish teacher, singer/songwriter and guitarist
- Marie Louise Lindberg (1918–2005), mineralogist
- Merit Frost Lindberg (born 1973), Swedish politician
- Morten Lindberg (1965–2019), also known as Master Fatman, Danish media personality

=== N–Z ===
- Odd F. Lindberg (1945–2021), Norwegian freelance journalist, arctic explorer and film maker
- Oskar Lindberg (composer) (1887–1955), Swedish composer
- Oskar Lindberg (cross-country skier) (1894–1977), Swedish cross-country skier
- Patrik Lindberg (born 1988), better known as f0rest, Swedish Counter-Strike player
- Sextus Otto Lindberg (1835–1889), Swedish physician and bryologist
- Sigfrid Lindberg (1897–1977), Swedish footballer
- Stig Lindberg (1916–1982), Swedish ceramic designer, glass designer, textile designer, industrial designer, painter, and illustrator
- Sven Lindberg (1918–2006), Swedish film actor and director
- Teres Lindberg (born 1974), Swedish politician
- Tomas Lindberg (1972–2025), Swedish singer and composer
- Torsten Lindberg (1917–2009), Swedish football player and manager
- Ulrika Knape-Lindberg (born 1955), Swedish diver, mother of Anna Lindberg
- Verner Lindberg (1852–1909), Finnish politician
- Wilson Lindberg (born 2006), Swedish footballer
- Ylva Lindberg (born 1976), Swedish ice hockey player

== See also ==
- Lindbergh (disambiguation)
- Leopold Lindtberg (1902–1984), Austrian Swiss film and theatre director
