= Lambrecht, Rhineland-Palatinate =

- Town
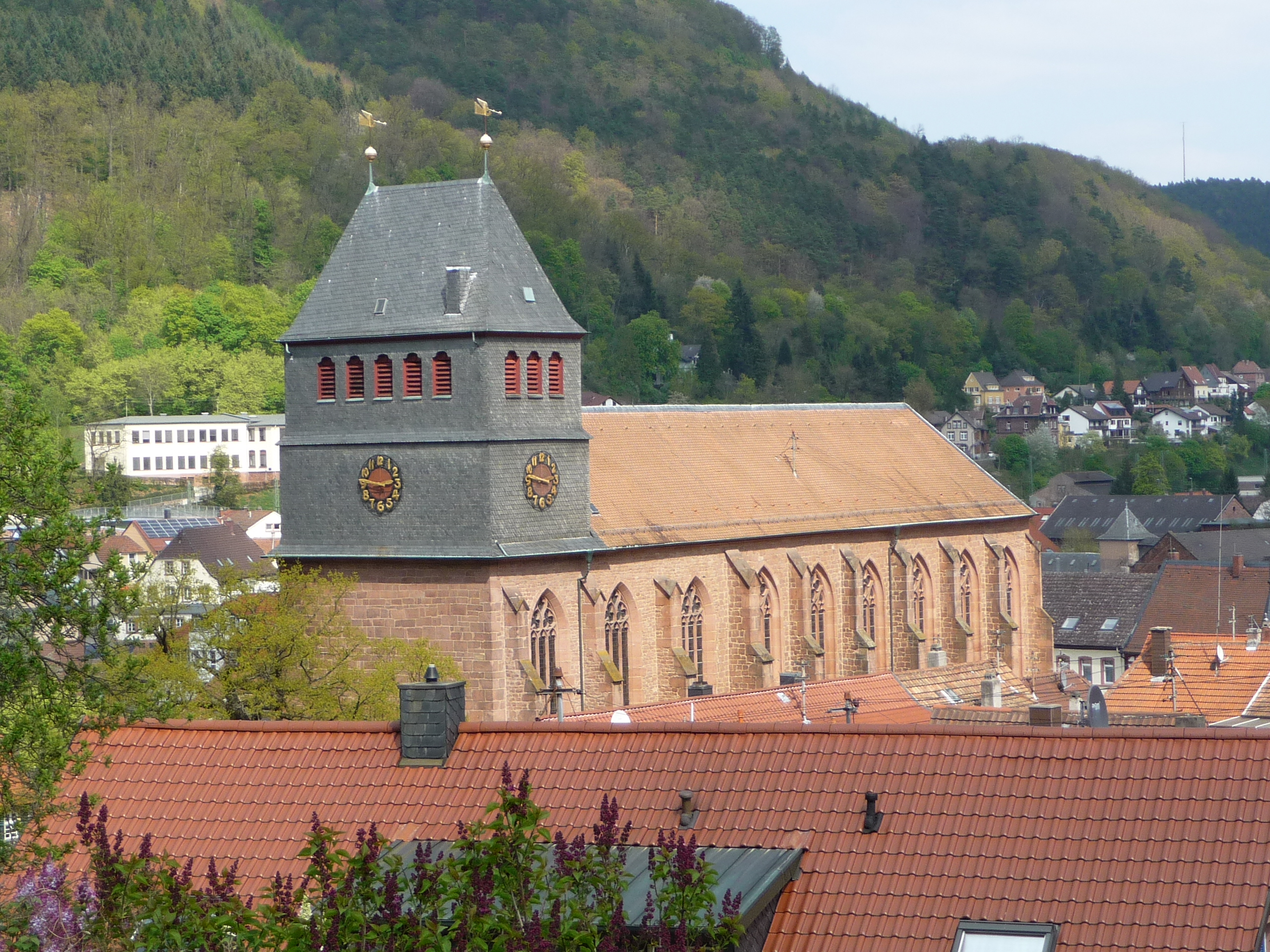
- Protestant parish church

- Coat of arms

- Location of Lambrecht, Rhineland-Palatinate within Bad Dürkheim district
- Interactive map of Lambrecht, Rhineland-Palatinate
- Location within Germany Location within Rhineland-Palatinate
- Coordinates: 49°22′49″N 08°05′10″E
- Country: Germany
- State: Rhineland-Palatinate
- District: Bad Dürkheim
- Municipal assoc.: Lambrecht (Pfalz)

Government
  - Mayor (2019–24): Karl-Günter Müller (FW)

Area
  - Total: 8.32 km^{2} (3.21 sq mi)
- Elevation: 173 m (568 ft)

Population (2025-12-31)
  - Total: 3,923
  - Density: 472/km^{2} (1,220/sq mi)
- Time zone: UTC+01:00 (CET)
  - Summer (DST): UTC+02:00 (CEST)
- Postal codes: 67466
- Dialling codes: 06325
- Vehicle registration: DÜW
- Website: www.lambrecht-pfalz.de

Lambrecht (German pronunciation: [ˈlambʁɛçt]) is a town in the Bad Dürkheim district in Rhineland-Palatinate, Germany lying roughly 6 km northwest of Neustadt an der Weinstraße. It is the seat of the like-named Verbandsgemeinde.

== Geography ==
=== Location ===
The municipality lies in the Palatinate, and indeed in the middle of the Palatinate Forest. It is crossed by the river Speyerbach. The municipality's highest mountain is the Kaisergarten at 519 m above sea level.

=== Land use ===
Lambrecht's 8.32 km^{2} is distributed as follows:

Land use	ha
Estates and buildings	86
Paths, streets and the like	41
Other uses	21
Commercial use	25
Woodland	655
Open water	3
Other areas, wasteland, etc.	1

== History ==
In 977, Lambrecht had its first documentary mention. Duke Otto of Worms (Otto I, Duke of Carinthia) endowed the Benedictine Convent of Saint Lambrecht for the village of Grevenhausen. The convent was dissolved in 1553. In 1568, the disused convent's buildings together with houses, church and cropfields was turned over as an asylum by Frederick III, Elector Palatine to Walloons who had been driven from their homeland.

In 1838 or 1839, the two neighbouring villages of St Lambrecht and Grevenhausen merged. On 25 August 1849, Lambrecht became a stop on the railway when the Neustadt-Frankenstein section of the Palatinate Ludwig Railway was opened, completing the Rhein-Saar line for coal transport. Since 21 December 1887, Lambrecht has held town rights. On 1 March 1972, the Verbandsgemeinde of Lambrecht was formed. Administrative activities were assumed on 1 January 1973.

=== Religion ===
Lambrecht has an autonomous Catholic parish (Sacred Heart of Jesus/Herz Jesu). The Catholic parish is the sponsor of the St Lambertus daycare centre. The pastor in the parish community tends not only Lambrecht but also the municipalities of Lindenberg, Neidenfels-Frankeneck and Weidenthal-Frankenstein. The Lambrecht parish is part of the parish league of Neustadt (Weinstraße) in the deaconry of Bad Dürkheim and belongs to the Diocese of Speyer.

Together with the neighbouring centre of Lindenberg there exists a Protestant parish. Lambrecht is part of the Protestant deaconry of Neustadt in the Evangelical Church of the Palatinate.

In 2007, 43.8% of the inhabitants were Evangelical and 30.4% Catholic. The rest belonged to other faiths or adhered to none.

== Politics ==
=== Town council ===
The council is made up of 20 council members, who were elected at the municipal election held on 7 June 2009, and the honorary mayor as chairman.

The municipal election held on 7 June 2009 yielded the following results:

Year	SPD	CDU	FWG	Total
2009	6	8	6	20 seats
2004	5	11	4	20 seats

=== Coat of arms ===
The German blazon reads: Von Schwarz und Grün geteilt, oben ein rotbewehrter, -bezungter und -bekrönter goldener Löwe, unten drei silberne Lämmer.

The town's arms might in English heraldic language be described thus: Per fess sable a lion passant Or armed, langued and crowned gules, and vert three lambs argent passant.

The arms were granted on 21 December 1887 by Bavarian Prince Regent Luitpold and go back to a seal from 1707, although compositions involving the same charges go back to 1583. Several versions are known from the intervening time. One also showed the lion holding a book in his paws to symbolize the University of Heidelberg, which was the local landlord after 1553. The upper field in the escutcheon shows the Palatine Lion, although here passant (walking) instead of rampant (rearing up). This stands for the town's former allegiance to Electoral Palatinate. The sheep – or rather lambs, as the German blazon stipulates – symbolize the wool industry that throve here after the Walloon refugees arrived in the 16th century. They are also canting for the name Lambrecht (“lamb” is Lamm in German).

== Culture and sightseeing ==
=== Buildings and other manmade monuments ===
- Karl-Marx-Straße 14 – the building that thus far has the earliest dating (1606)
- Wallonenstraße 11 – guildhall from 1607/1608 – restored 2004–06 – today town hall of the town of Lambrecht
- Untermühle (“Lower Mill”) – from 1743 (near the bridge across the Speyerbach on Fabrikstraße)
- Dominican nuns’ former convent church – today a Protestant church, begun in 1320
- Catholic Parish Church Herz Jesu (“Heart of Jesus”) – oldest parts from 1750, quire, nave and tower from 1953
- so-called Post-Turm (tower) – built in 1884 by commercial councillor Carl Marx on the model of Miramare near Trieste.
- Villa Marx
- Villa Haas
- Organ by Johann Georg Geib from 1777 in the Protestant church (former convent church)
- Dicker-Stein-Turm – lookout tower on the Hoher Kopf (Schauerberg)
- Edith Stein memorial site
- Glaß-Art-Collection

=== Natural monuments ===
- Teufelsfelsen (“Devil’s Cliffs”) – cliff plateau with wonderful view

=== Regular events ===
- Eierpicken on Easter Monday at Pickplatz – This is an Easter custom that involves a contest in which players attempt to shell each other's Easter eggs – each using his or her own egg as the “weapon”.
- Delivery of the tribute billygoat to Deidesheim on Whit Tuesday as part of the Geißbockversteigerung (“Billygoat Auction”)
- Geißbock-Festspiel at Marxparkplatz on Fabrikstraße across the street from the Jahnwiese sporting ground
- Lambrechter Geißbock-Kerwe (fair), each year on the first Saturday in August
- Sommerliche Abendmusiken (“Summertime Evening Music”) in the former convent church
- Advent market
- Every other year: industrial fair for commercial operations in Lambrecht and the surrounding area
- Geißbock MTB-Marathon

== Economy and infrastructure ==
=== Economy ===
For a long time, Lambrecht was said to be a clothmaking town. With the Huguenots, or more precisely the Walloons from Belgium who migrated here in the 16th century, a flourishing clothmaking industry grew up in Lambrecht. Thus it was that on Wallonenstraße, a street in Lambrecht's town centre, a genuine clothmaking centre with many hand-weaving businesses sprang up.

Witnessing this time is the Zunfthaus (“Guildhall”) from 1606/1607 with its oriel window. The stately building goes back to a wealthy Walloon immigrant.

After the Industrial Revolution, many businesses did not make the leap to factory scale. Nevertheless, in 1931 there were still nine cloth factories in town, and only in the 1960s did clothmaking finally die out as an industry.

Today, one former cloth factory makes felts, paper machine clothing and needled felts. In another former cloth factory, special switching devices are made, which have been successfully marketed worldwide. Moreover, a multifaceted midsize supply industry has developed.

Besides these operations, tourism and, to a far lesser extent, forestry are also among the town's economic factors. The town also has at its disposal a variety of shopping places, craft businesses and service industries that fulfil daily demands.

=== Education ===
Located in Lambrecht are three kindergartens and two general-education schools. Hauptschule and Realschule functions are integrated into the Regional School. Gymnasien can be found in the bigger neighbouring town of Neustadt an der Weinstraße. Dealing in adult education are the folk high school and the Pfalzakademie (“Palatinate Academy”).

==== Kindergartens ====
- “Arche Noah” Evangelical kindergarten
- “St. Lambertus” Catholic kindergarten
- “Rappelkiste” municipal kindergarten
- Nursery for schoolchildren at the Evangelical kindergarten

==== Schools ====
- Grundschule Lambrecht (primary school)
- Regionale Schule Lambrecht (Hauptschule/Realschule)
- Volkshochschule Verbandsgemeinde Lambrecht (folk high school)

=== Transport ===
- Lambrecht lies on the Palatinate Way of St. James (Speyer–Hornbach), an old pilgrimage route.
- The Kuckucksbähnel heritage railway (Neustadt an der Weinstraße–Elmstein) also stops at Lambrecht railway station.
- RheinNeckar S-Bahn with lines S1 and S2 runs on the Pfälzische Ludwigsbahn.
- Bundesstraße 39 runs through town.

== Famous people ==
=== Sons and daughters of the town ===
- Ludwig Louis (1814–1894), politician
- Heinrich Lieser (1879−?), politician (SPD)
- Hermann Alker (1885–1967), architect
- Rudolf Röhrig (1903–1970), politician (NSDAP)

=== Famous people associated with the town ===
- Dr. Bernhard Würschmitt (21 November 1788 - 18 June 1853) was a Catholic priest and famous artist (painter, sculptor, etc.). He held office as Grevenhausen's parish priest from 1826 to 1828. From his hand came the high altar painting Kreuzigung Christi (“Christ’s Crucifixion”), the oil painting Maria Immaculata and an extraordinary pulpit-confessional, which are all to be found at Lambrecht's Catholic church.
