= Lindbergh (disambiguation) =

Charles Lindbergh (1902–1974) was an American aviator, the first pilot to fly solo non-stop across the Atlantic.

Lindbergh may also refer to:

== People ==
Surname

- Anne Lindbergh (1940–1993), U.S. children's author, daughter of the famous pilot Charles Lindbergh
- Anne Morrow Lindbergh (1906–2001), U.S. author and aviator; wife of Charles Lindbergh
- August Lindbergh (1808–1893), Swedish-American farmer and politician
- Charles August Lindbergh (1859–1924), U.S. Congressman and father of Charles Lindbergh
- Jon Lindbergh (1932–2021), U.S. diver and demolition expert, son of Charles Lindbergh
- Erik Lindbergh (born c. 1965), U.S. aviator; grandson of the famous pilot Charles Lindbergh
- Pelle Lindbergh (1959–1985), Swedish ice hockey player
- Peter Lindbergh (1944–2019), German fashion photographer

Given name

- Lindbergh Farias (b. 1969), Brazilian politician

== Places ==
=== United States ===
- Lindbergh, Atlanta, officially Lindbergh/Morosgo, neighborhood of Atlanta, Georgia
- Lindbergh Boulevard, a section of Missouri state highway running through St. Louis
- Lindbergh Center station, a passenger rail station in Atlanta, Georgia
- Lindbergh Field, former name of San Diego International Airport
- Lindbergh High School (St. Louis, Missouri), a high school named after Charles Lindbergh, the aviator.
- Lindbergh Senior High School (Renton, Washington), a high school named after Charles Lindbergh, the aviator

=== Other countries ===
- Lindbergh, Alberta, a hamlet in the County of St. Paul No. 19, Alberta, Canada
- Lindbergh Range, in Greenland

== Astronomy ==
- Lindbergh (crater), a lunar crater named after Charles Lindbergh
- Lindbergh rock mound, in Endeavour Crater, Mars

== Other ==
- "Lindbergh (The Eagle of the U.S.A.)", a 1927 popular song written by Howard Johnson and Al Sherman
- Lindbergh (book), a 1999 Pulitzer Prize winning biography by A. Scott Berg
- Sega Lindbergh, an arcade system board developed by Sega
- GoJet Airlines, callsign "Lindbergh" after Charles Lindbergh
- "Lindbergh", a 1940s song written by Woody Guthrie in The Asch Recordings

== See also ==
- Lindbergh's grass mouse, a rodent species from South America
- Lindbergh kidnapping, the abduction and murder of the son of Charles and Anne Lindbergh
- Lindbergh Law, a nickname for the Federal Kidnapping Act adopted in response to the Lindbergh kidnapping
- Lindberg (surname), for people with that spelling of the surname
- Lindberg (disambiguation), for other uses of the name
- Lindy (disambiguation)
