= Peterskopf (Haardt) =

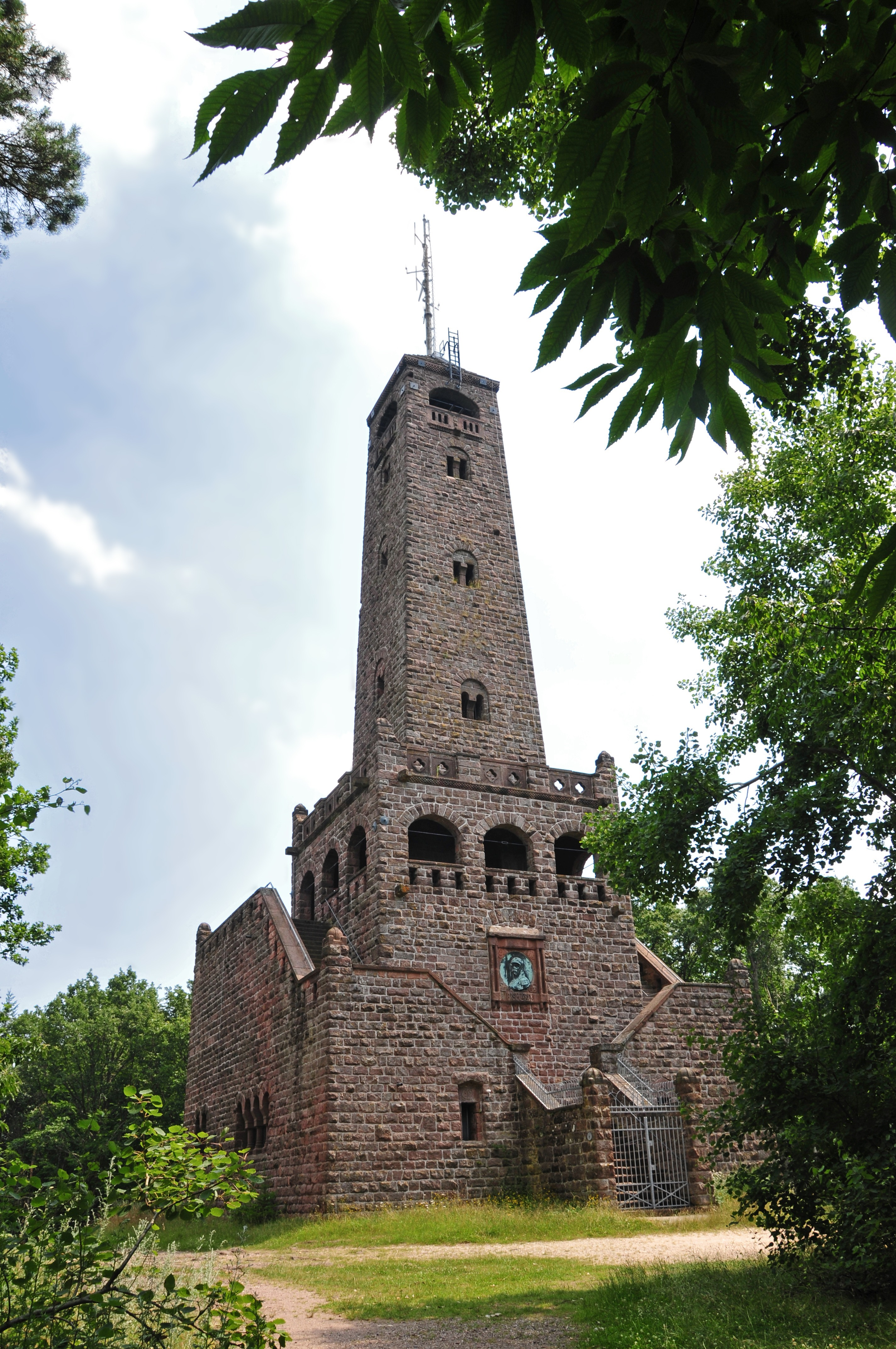
- The Bismarck Tower on the Peterskopf

Highest point
- Elevation: 487 m above sea level (NN) (1,598 ft)
- Coordinates: 49°28′45″N 8°07′48″E

Geography
- Location within Rhineland-Palatinate
- Location: Palatine Forest, Rhineland-Palatinate, Germany
- Parent range: Haardt

Geology
- Rock type: Bunter Sandstone

The Peterskopf, near the Palatine county town of Bad Dürkheim in the German state of Rhineland-Palatinate, is a 487-metre-high hill in the Haardt mountains. On its summit is the Bismarck tower.

== Geography ==
=== Location ===
The hill lies 3 km northwest of Bad Dürkheim on the eastern edge of the Palatine Forest on the forest estate of the municipality of Kallstadt; the actual village being in the northeast, 4 km away. On the southeastern slope of the hill, 700 metres from the summit, are the ruins of the Weilach farmstead, first mentioned in 1381. The River Isenach flows past the Peterskopf to the southwest before entering the town of Bad Dürkheim.

=== Accessibility ===
A tarmac road runs to the Peterskopf from Leistadt, the distance to the car park by Forsthaus Lindemannsruhe (470 m) being 2.5 km. From there the summit may be reached on foot in about ten minutes.

=== Surrounding area ===
In the area around the Peterskopf there is a host of historic sites: the Teufelsstein hill to the southeast with its eponymous rock formation, which was a cult site in Celtic times; and a Celtic circular rampart, the Heidenmauer and the Roman quarry of Kriemhildenstuhl on the Kästenberg, a southeastern spur of the Teufelsstein.

On the far side of the Isenach valley lie the medieval ruins of Limburg Abbey and the castle of Hardenburg.

== Summit ==
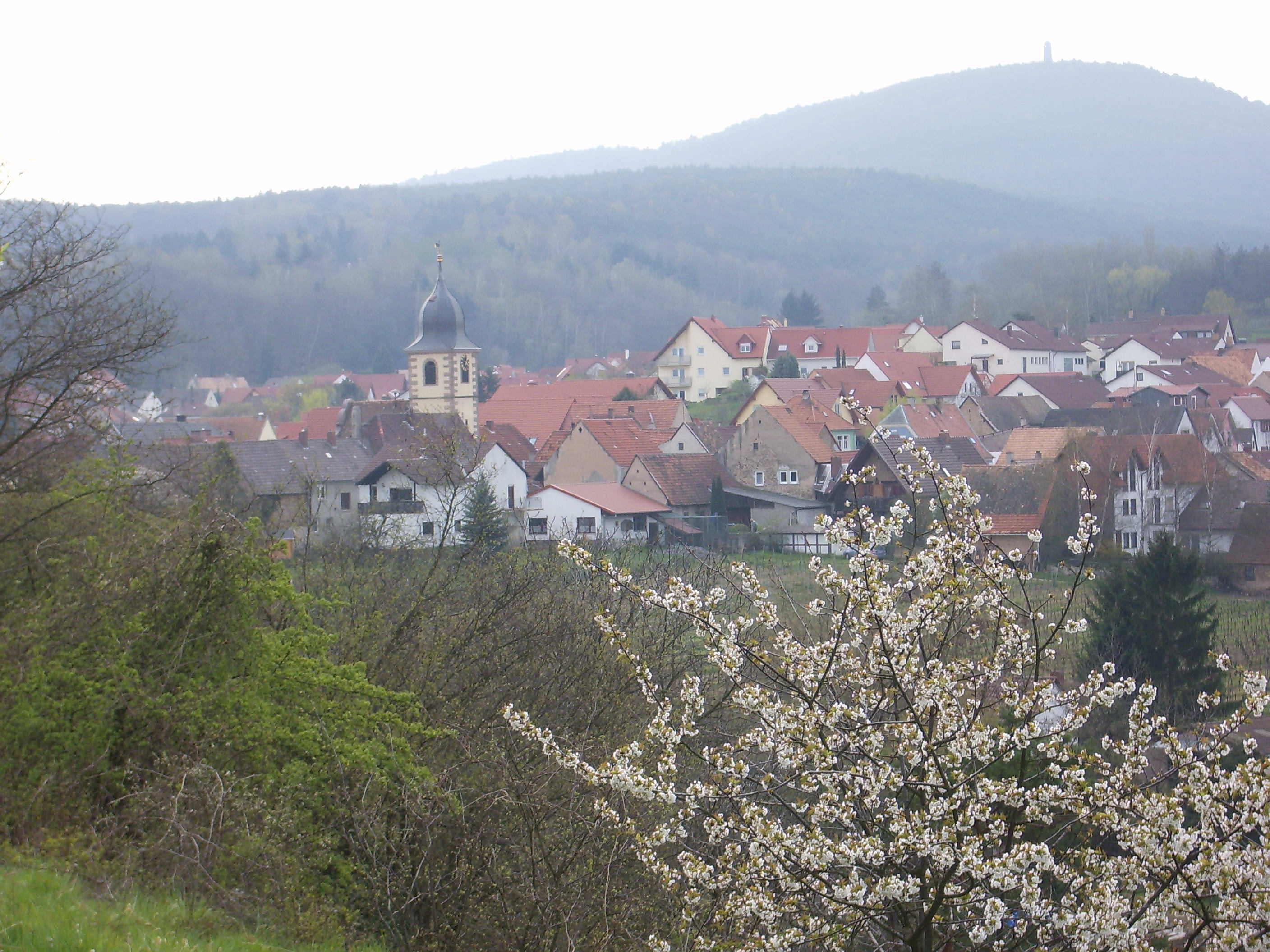
View from the Felsenberg-Berntal Nature Reserve looking southwest over Leistadt to the Peterskopf

On the summit plateau of the Peterskopf the good 30-metre-high Bismarck tower offers a panoramic view of the Upper Rhine Plain, 400 metres below to the east, the Palatine Forest to the west and its eastern ridge, the Haardt, which runs from north to south. There is a restaurant on the lower floor of the tower.

On 27 May 1925 the concrete ceiling of the second viewing platform collapsed whilst a school class was visiting the tower. One schoolboy was killed and several children were injured.

== Sport ==
The Peterskopf is the finish of the annual Bade Durkheim Hill Race (Bad Dürkheimer Berglauf) in October. The route is 8,700 metres long and involves 510 metres of overall climbing, making it the longest and steepest element of the Palatine Hill Running Cup. the hill and its environs are also suitable for mountain bike tours.
