= Leininger Sporn =

Prominent ridge in western Germany

Coordinates: 49.4934°N 8.1188°E

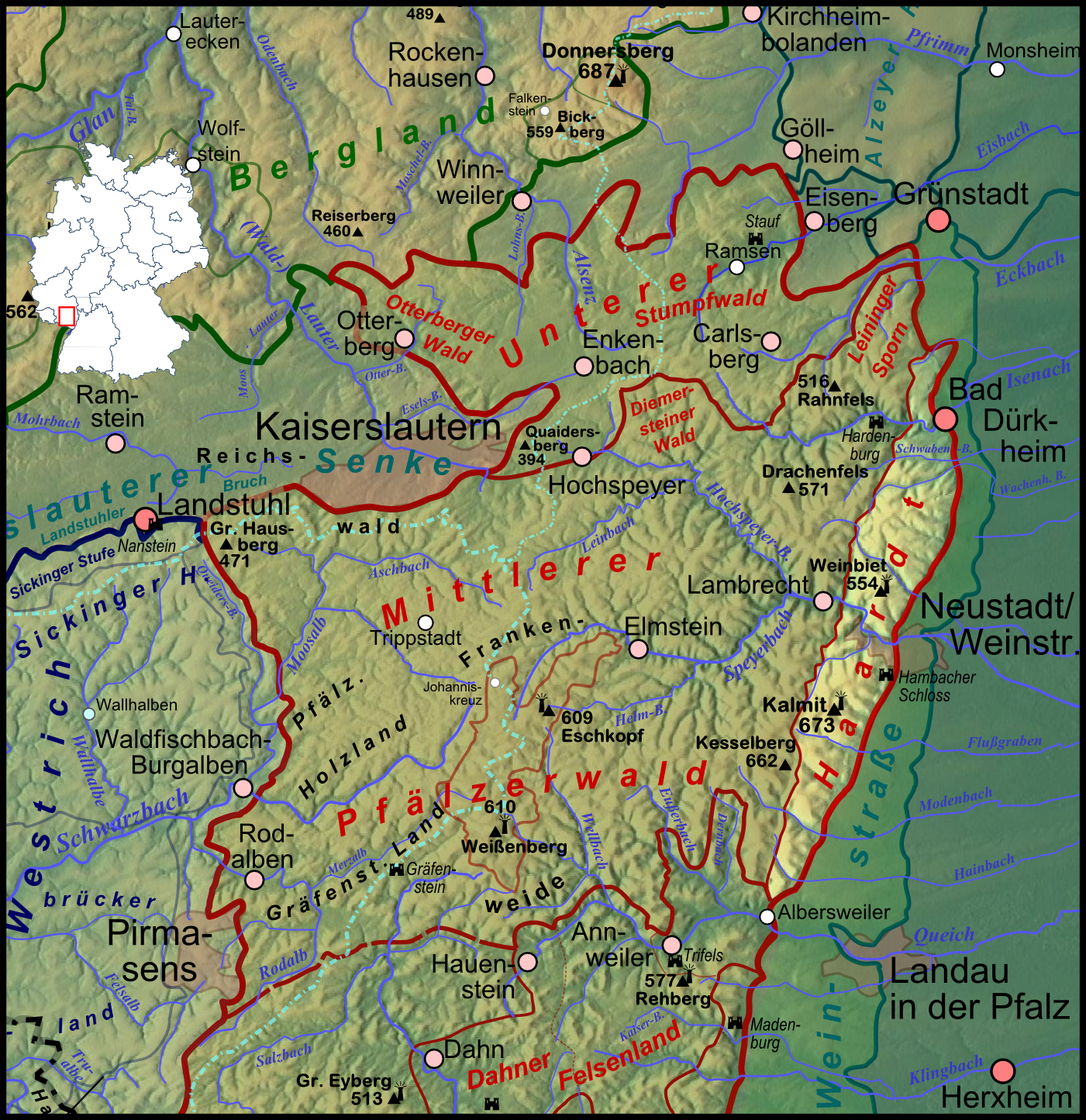
Relief of the Palatine Forest. Right: the Haardt (highlit) and above that (north) the Leininger Sporn

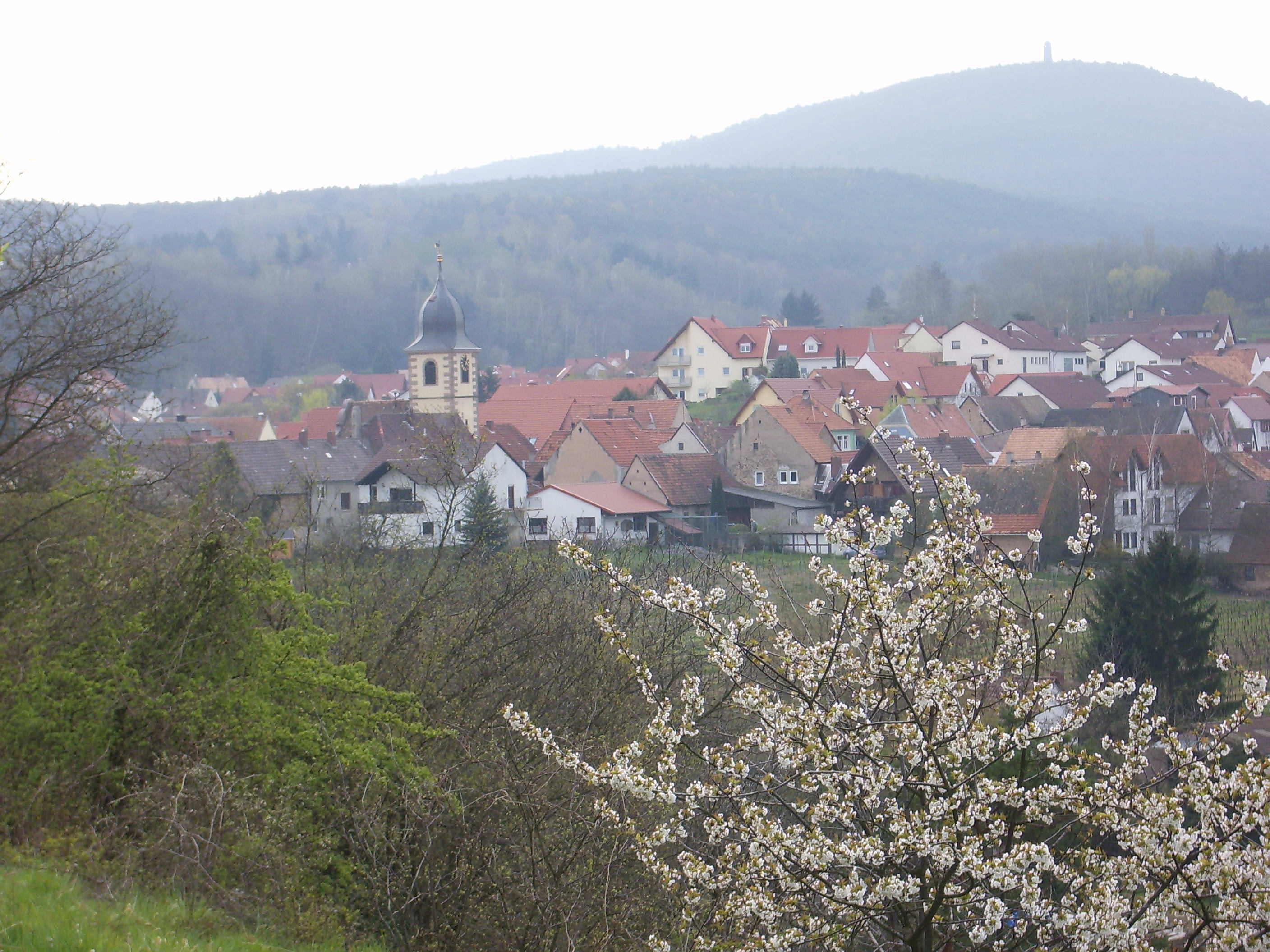
View from the Felsenberg-Berntal Nature Reserve

The Leininger Sporn is a highly prominent ridge in the northeast of the Palatinate Forest in western Germany, mainly composed of the rock formations of the Middle and Upper Bunter. It forms the western edge of Upper Rhine Plain between Grünstadt in the north and Leistadt, a village in the county of Bad Dürkheim, in the southeast. In the natural region system of the German Central Uplands it is considered one of the four sub-units of the Middle Palatinate Forest.

== Geography ==
=== Location ===
The Leininger Sporn lies between the valleys of the river Isenach in the south and the Eckbach stream in the north, and has an area of around 44.8 km². From north to south it is about 10 kilometres long, and from east to west it is about 4 to 5, and at its northern tip, only about 2 to 3 kilometres wide.
The outer boundary of this hill ridge runs from the Kleinkarlbach in the northeast, southwards along the edge of the Rhine Graben, before swinging southwest at Leistadt. Here it follows the Lambrecht Fault, a fracture line that crosses the Isenach valley at Hausen between Peterskopf and Teufelsstein, and separates the mountain range of the Haardt from the Leininger Sporn and the Limburg-Durkheim Forest that lies to the southwest. At the Alten Schmelz it turns north and reaches the valley of the Höninger Bach and village of Höningen after crossing the Rahnfels hill (517 m AMSL (NHN)). Here the natural region transitions smoothly in the west into the foothills of the Inner Palatine Forest and, in the northwest, into the Stumpfwald and the forest clearances of the Eisenberg Basin. From Altleiningen the boundary follows the valley of the Eckbach as far as Kleinkarlbach in a northeasterly direction.

=== Name ===
The name "Leininger Sporn" was coined by the geographer, Adalbert Pemöller, who in the 1960s developed a detailed internal subdivision of the Palatine Forest for the Handbook of Natural Region Divisions of Germany. In doing so, Pemöller gave the historic name, Leiningerland, for this natural sub-region, which in turn was derived from the formerly important noble family of the House of Leiningen. From a geographic perspective, the Leiningerland, and the low mountain country of the Leininger Sporn are also part of the wine route region and the zone of low, rolling hills on the edge of the mountain region and the Upper Rhine Plain.

=== Landscape character ===
The relief of the natural environment is characterized by a distinctive ridge with steep hillsides, extending from the Pickelhaube (360.7 m above sea level (NHN)) in the north to the Rahnfels and the Heidenfels (496.0 m) in the south, and which drops steeply to the Eckbach valley, the Upper Rhine Plain and, especially, into the Isenach valley by 250 to 300 metres in altitude. Rivers both large and small have cut deeply into the sandstone beds, so that the landscape has a varied topography with V-shaped valleys, rock formations and cliffs. Larger valleys include the Langental to the northwest of the spur and the Krumbach valley beginning at the Ungeheuersee and running in a northeasterly direction as far as the Kleinkarlbach stream. In the south, on the other hand, the hill range is only drained by a few smaller streams that flow in narrow V-shaped valleys into the Isenach.

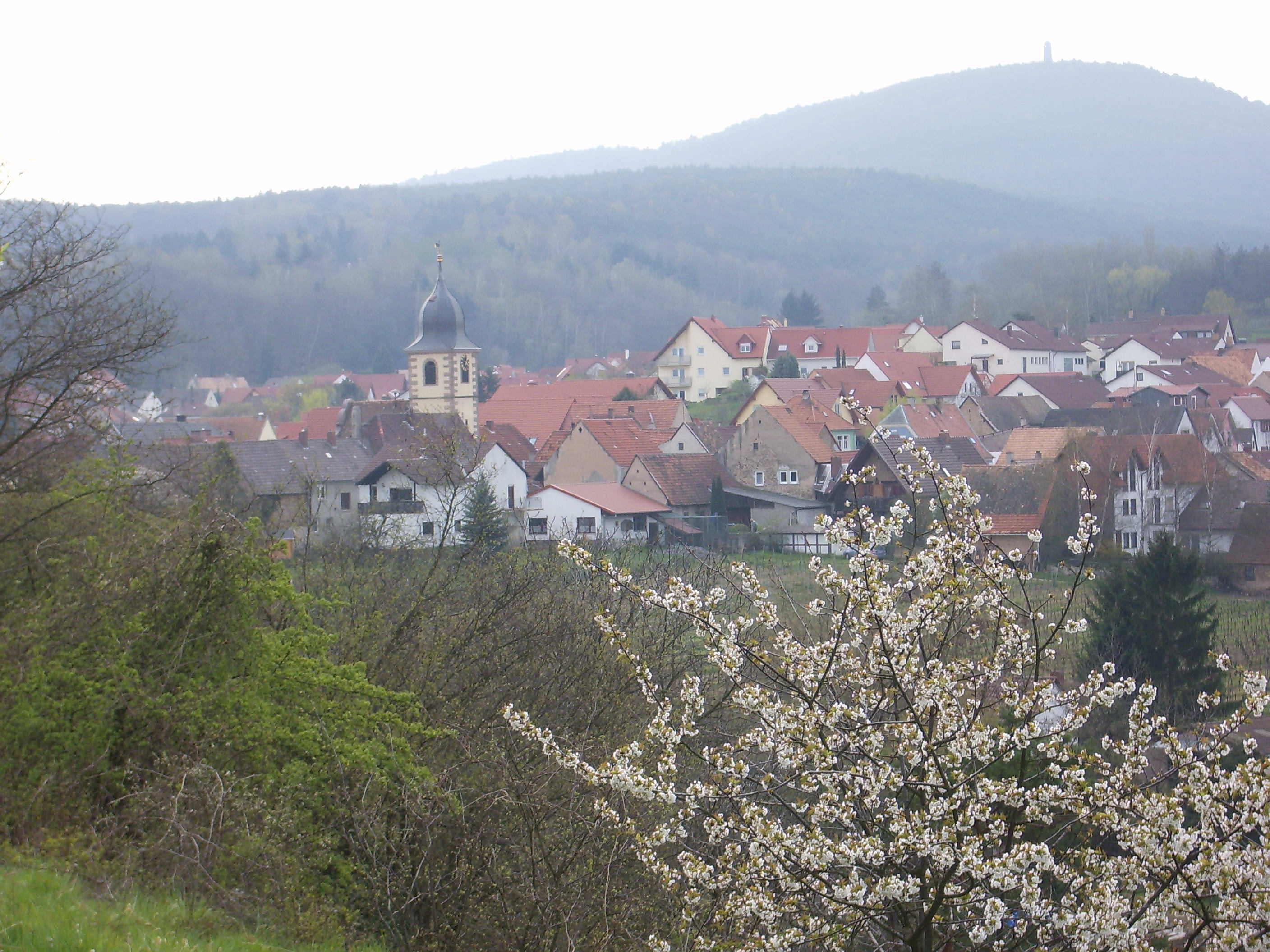
View from the Felsenberg-Berntal Nature Reserve looking southwest over Leistadt to the Peterskopf

The landscape of the Leininger Sporn is mainly characterized by dense forest which, in the east, is mainly dominated by conifers, especially pine monocultures or mixed stands of pine and mixed beech whose ground flora is often composed of heather, simple grasses and blueberry bushes. These pine forests were created in the 19th and 20th centuries through targeted reforestation of land that had been used for intensive farming over long periods of time - for example for the production of wooden poles for viticulture and had become over-exploited wasteland. In addition to these typical Haardt forests, chestnuts are also found in warmer sites at the eastern foot of the hills, often occurring in large stands. Wine and fruit growing also demonstrate the favourable climate of Weinstraße region and create a varied landscape alternating with foothills of the Haardt Forest.
. The forest areas in the west of this natural region, by contrast, are of somewhat different composition. Here, inter alia in the area of the Rahnfels and Heidenfels, there are larger mixed stands with a higher proportion of Hardwood and a more balanced age range, so that these areas in terms of forest cover and composition are similar to the remaining natural areas of the Central Palatinate Forest.

Human settlement activity is restricted to the peripheral regions of the Leininger Sporn; the hill country itself is not settled. One area that stands out is an isolated clearing at the northeastern edge of the spur in the municipality of Battenberg, which includes Battenberg Castle, at a height of about 300 metres above sea level (NHN). This open area is mainly used for agriculture, since the dominating loam-clay soils, a weathering product of the erosion of Upper Bunter sandstone are rich in nutrients and so, unlike other regions of the Middle Palatinate Forest, allow higher yields. In contrast, the formerly widespread vineyards are in decline, something that is apparent from the old vineyard terraces in the north of the municipal territory. In addition, orchards and waste land can be found on hillsides in the parish of Battenberg. A geological feature and classified as natural monument, are the Blitzröhren below Battenberg Castle. These are tubular iron bands of rock, embedded in an ochre-coloured sandstone rock face several metres high caused and by precipitation and the sintered formation of iron solutions.

== Historic iron region ==
To the west, settlements are concentrated in the valleys of the Eckbach, with the village and castle of Altleiningen, and the Höninger Bach with the village of Höningen and ruins of a former monastery, encouraged by the former ironworks. In places, there are recoverable iron ore deposits geologically dependent on faults along the edge of the Leininger Sporn.

The Eckbach valley was part of the historic iron processing of the region, e.g. there was a big ironworks below Altleiningen (Maihof-Drahtzug). The stream was impounded to create reservoirs for the ironworks and also drove several sawmills. Upstream, it has the character of a meadow valley.

== Literature ==
- August Becker: Die Pfalz und die Pfälzer. 7th edn., Pfälzische Verlagsanstalt, Landau/Pfalz, 2005 (1st edn. 1857), pp. 138–154, ISBN 3898571939
- Michael Geiger: Haardt und Weinstraße im geographischen Überblick. In: Michael Geiger (ed.): Haardt und Weinstraße – Beiträge zur Landeskunde. Verlag der Pfälzischen Gesellschaft zur Förderung der Wissenschaften, Speyer, 1996, pp. 6–35 ISBN 3-932155-14-9
- Michael Geiger: Die Landschaften der Pfalz.In: Michael Geiger (ed.): Geographie der Pfalz. Verlag Pfälzische Landeskunde, Landau/Pfalz, 2010, pp. 92–113 ISBN 9783981297409
- Daniel Häberle: Der Pfälzerwald. Ein Beitrag zur Landeskunde der Rheinpfalz. Georg Westermann Verlag, Brunswick and Berlin, 1913
- Karl Heinz: Pfalz mit Weinstraße. Landschaft, Geschichte, Kultur, Kunst, Volkstum. Glock und Lutz Verlag, Heroldsberg, 1976, pp. 375–381, ASIN B002GZ8RN
- Klaus Meyer: Die Wälder der Haardt: gestern – heute – morgen. In: Michael Geiger (Hrsg): Haardt und Weinstraße – Beiträge zur Landeskunde. Verlag der Pfälzischen Gesellschaft zur Förderung der Wissenschaften, Speyer, 1996 ISBN 3-932155-14-9, S. 248–249
- Adalbert Pemöller: Die naturräumlichen Einheiten auf Blatt 160 Landau i. d. Pfalz. Geographische Landesaufnahme 1 : 200,000 Naturräumliche Gliederung Deutschlands. Selbstverlag der Bundesforschungsanstalt für Landeskunde und Raumordnung, Bad Godesberg, 1969
- Heinz Wittner: Großer Pfalzführer. Deutscher Wanderverlag Dr. Mair & Schnabel & Co., Stuttgart, 1981 pp. 307–312, ISBN 3813401065
