= Celtic Castle on Jakob's Hill =

Iron age castle in Hungary

- Jakabhegyi földvár
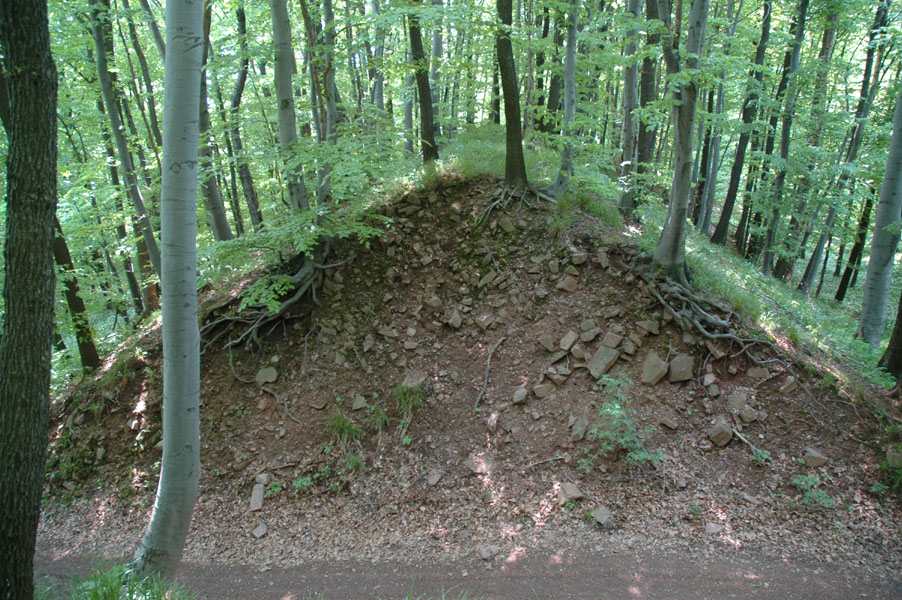

- Location within Hungary

General information
- Type: Hillfort
- Location: Jakab-hegy, Baranya county, Hungary
- Coordinates: 46°05′43″N 18°08′32″E
- Construction started: 750BC
- Renovated: 350BC
- Demolished: 9 AD abandoned
- Owner: Hallstatt Culture Pannonian Celts

Height
- Height: 6–10 m (ruins)

The Jakab Hill castle was an early Iron Age castle built as a circular rampart of earth and stone in the Mecsek, on the Jakab Hill, Hungary. The Celtic was situated on the Jakab-hegy overlooking the Drave flood plain. The ruins of a Pauline Monastery is situated within the old ramparts of the castle. The ruins of the monastery, which is located in the middle of the castle, are visible and preserved. The shape castle wall is visible in the satellite images.

== History ==
The largest Iron Age castle of the Carpathian Basin was built at the site of a Bronze Age settlement on the plateau of the Jakab Hill in the early Iron Age. It the most important centre of power in Southern Pannonia before the Roman conquest. It might have been the capital of an Iron Age kingdom, the scope of which could have been somewhere between the Alps and the Danube-Lake Balaton.

== Features ==
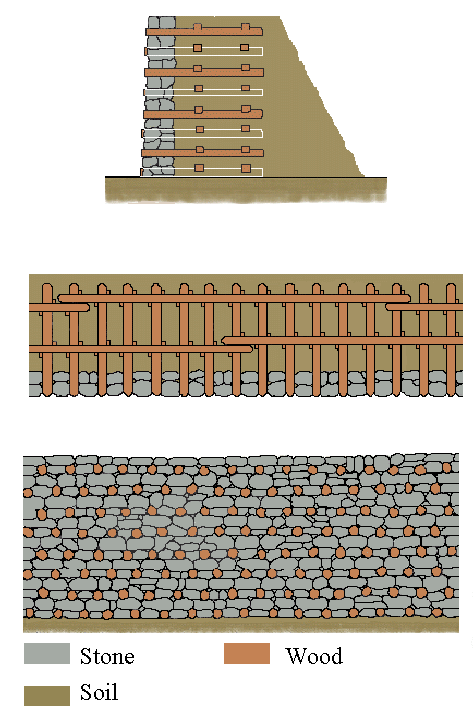
Celtic fortress wall as described by Caesar in Bello Gallico

The two-part fortification was surrounded by 6–10 m (20–33 ft) high stone and earth wall with the southerly wall, that overlooks a cliff, lower. The second fortification part is roughly 5 km (3.1 mi) long system of ramparts forming an outer ring. The within the main fortification is approx. 300 to 550 by 800 meters. The main fortification has a secondary rampart within it that divided it into two sections, lower part of the 400 x 250-meter contained some sort of "acropolis".

One of the original gates of the castle opens to the west of the acropolis. The other gate is on the south-east side.

In front of the castle, at the site of a former Bronze Age settlement, the graveyard of the Iron Age settlement was discovered, which is still recognizable under the trees of the forest with its stone-laid tombs and the cremation rituals with stone circles surrounding them. The side easiest to approach of the fortress was protected by the highest rampart sections.

== Inhabitants ==
Its inhabitants were the people of the Early Iron Hallstatt culture, and they built the Earth's fortress around 750 BC. Later, around 350 BC it was further modified by the Celts and occupied as the capital of a kingdom until Roman times. The Romans might have forced the inhabitants of the city to leave their town because of their magnitude and good defences, and instead founded the nearby Sopianae, the predecessor of today's Pécs.

== Pauline Monastery ==
The Jakab Hill Pauline Monastery was a Pauline Order Monastery close by Kővágószőlős. It was established in 1225 but during the course of the Hungarian-Turkish wars, it was abandoned like many monasteries in the area. It was restored again in 1736. It was but abandoned again in 1828, and since then its building collapsed, and its walls are mostly just shoulder or waist high. Its ruins were preserved at the end of the 1970s and in 2006-2007. The ruins are open to the public.

== Gallery ==
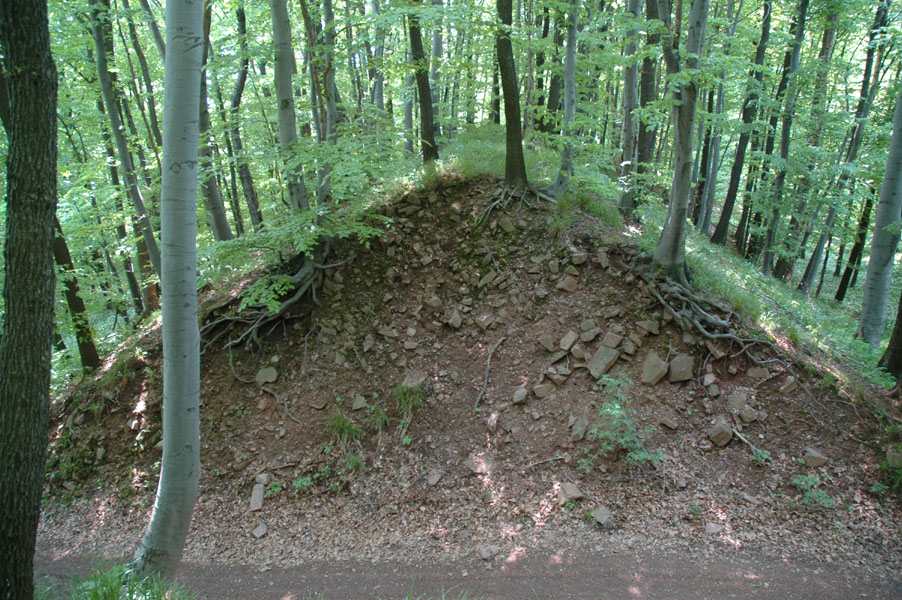
Intersection of the remains of the large wall

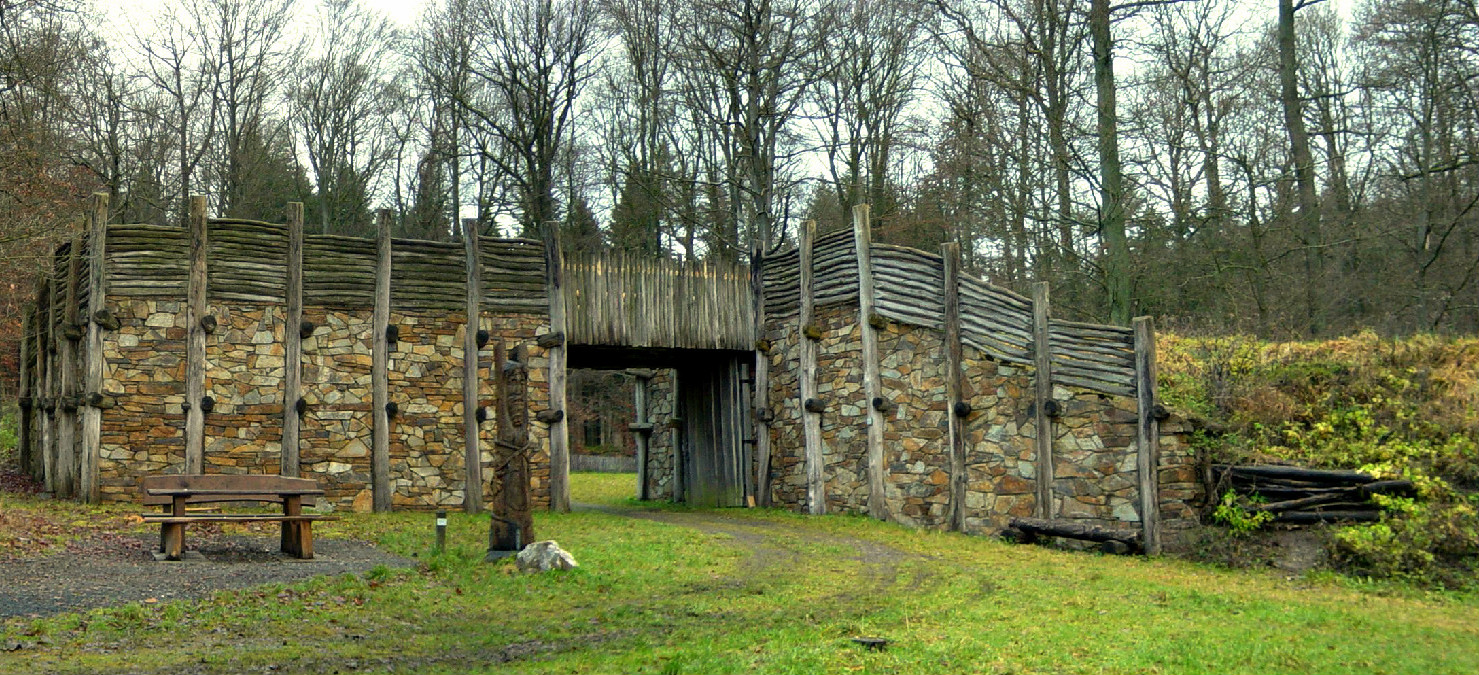
Reconstruction of the (T3) gate of the Celtic Castle of Dünsberg

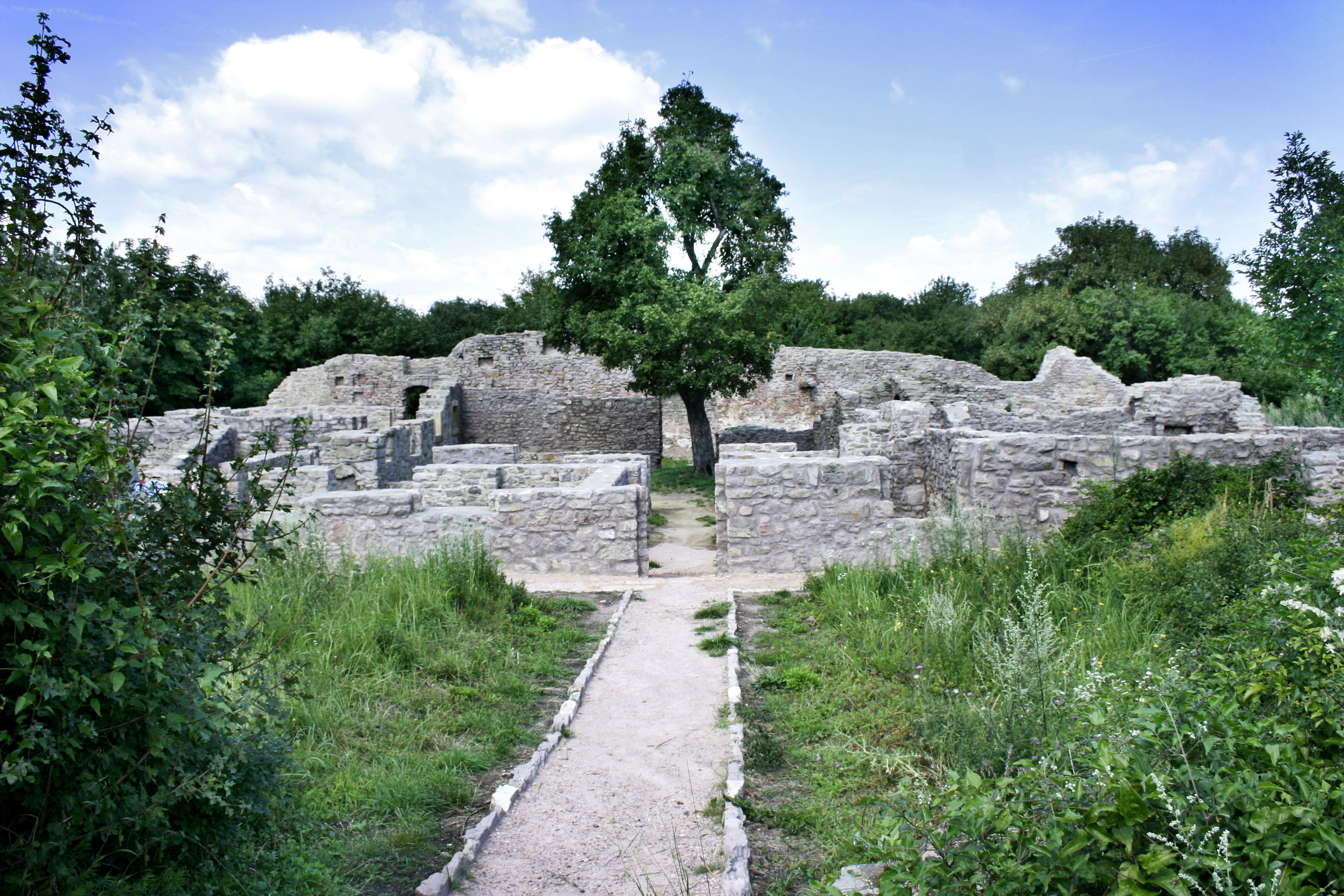
Ruins of the Pauline Monastery built within the castle area

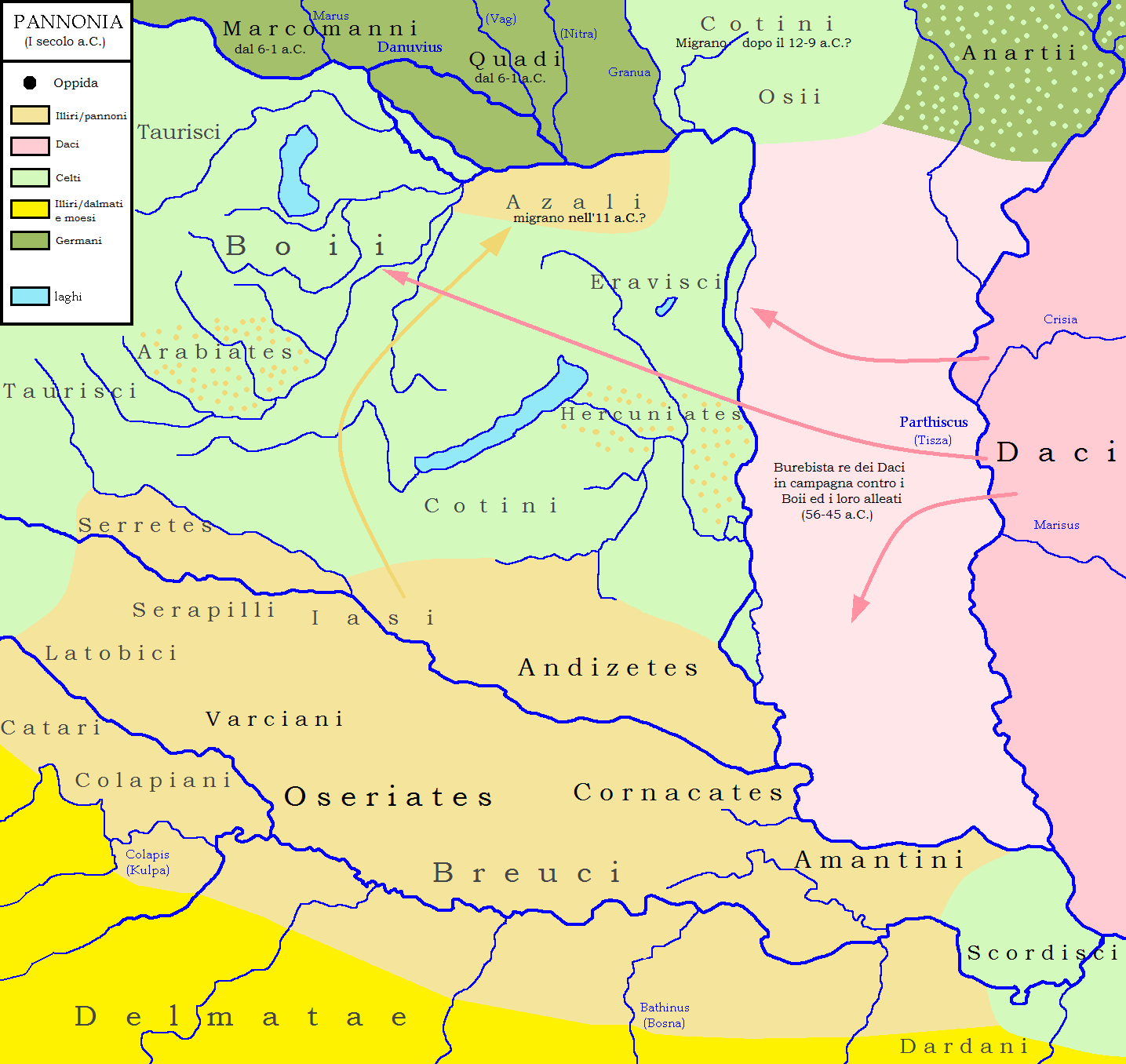
Ancient tribes in the middle Danube river basin around 1st C. BCE

== See also ==
- Heidenmauer (Palatinate)
- de:Ringwallanlage Dünsberg
- de:Alteburg (Biebergemünd)
- de:Höhensiedlung Burg in Schwarzenbach
- de:Ringwallanlage Daubhaus
