= Felsenberg =

Felsenberg is German for "rock hill" and may refer to:

- Felsenberg-Berntal Nature Reserve, a nature reserve in the Palatinate region of Germany
- Felsenberg a village in the borough of Schwenke (Halver), North Rhine-Westphalia, Germany
- Felsenberg (Gemeinde Pölla), a cadastral municipality in Lower Austria
