= Lindemannsruhe =

Coordinates: 49°28′44″N 8°07′14″E

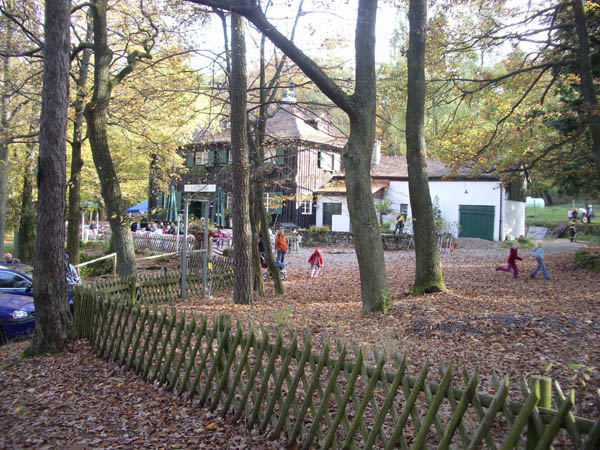
Lindemannsruhe inn

The Lindemannsruhe is an upland pass in the town of Freinsheim (Bad Dürkheim district) in the German state of Rhineland-Palatinate. The area was named after a former chief forester, Karl Friedrich Ludwig Lindemann (1805 - 1892), who worked in the area from 1855 - 1883. It is a popular recreation area for walkers, hikers and cyclists.

== Description ==
The Lindenmannsruhe lies at an altitude of 468.9 metres (1538 feet) above sea level (NN), below Peterskopf to the east (487 m). The area lies in the foothills of the Palatinate Forest.

On the Peterskopf summit, accessible from Lindemannsruhe via a 0.6 km footpath, stands the Bismarck Tower.

Lindemannsruhe is the base for many walkers and hikers as well as a training circuit for numerous mountain bikers and racing cyclists. On the heights is the Lindemannsruhe forester's lodge, built in 1927, as well as a car park. The woods on the Lindemannsruhe are dominated by sweet chestnut trees.

As a result of its location as an exclave the Lindemannsruhe Forester's Lodge is the only building in Freinsheim with both a different post code and dial code: 67098 instead of 67251, and 06322 instead of 06353.

== Sport ==
- From 2001 to at least 2006, the Palatine Mountain Sprint (a cycling race; in German: Pfälzer Bergsprint) ran via Höningen to the Lindemannsruhe.
- From 1997 - 2022, the Lindemannsruhe was part of the cycling route of the Maxdorf Triathlon.
