= Drachenfels Club =

Society for preservation of monuments

- Abbreviation: DVVD
- Formation: 14 April 1873
- Purpose: Local history, landscape preservation and conservation
- Headquarters: Bad Dürkheim
- Members: ca. 530
- Chairman: Egon Schmitt
- Website: http://www.drachenfelsclub.de

The Drachenfels Club is a society for the preservation and care of monuments in the vicinity of the German town of Bad Dürkheim. It oversees many natural monuments and listed buildings, some acquired through donations and others developed through its own initiatives.

== History ==
The Drachenfels Club was founded in 1873 under the chairmanship of Wilhelm Schepp. Its name came from the first project that the society undertook: to make the Dragon Cave (Drachenhöhle) accessible. The cave lies under the Drachenfels, a hill in the borough of Bad Dürkheim, which is linked to the legend of the Nibelung. Other renovations and the enclosure of spaces and natural monuments took place the following year. A short time later, probably around 1875, the new club was given the Laura Hut (Laurahütte) in Leistadt, which it had not built itself, but was able to use the legacy of the Retzer family from Freinsheim. From 1896 the club built its most expensive structure: the Bismarck Tower on the Peterskopf. Innumerable new refuge huts were built and countless renovations of buildings and natural sites followed. The club's activities were put on hold during the Second World War. In 1947 it was re-founded in its present form.

== Cultural monuments ==
- Laura Hut (Leistadt)
- Bismarck Tower
- Kriemhildenstuhl
- Flaggenturm
- Kaiser-Wilhelm-Höhe
- Schaeferwarte
- Vigilienturm

== Natural monuments ==
- Drachenfels
- Drei Eichen
- Heidefelsen
