= Bad Dürkheim lift =

Coordinates: 49.4694°N 8.16278°E

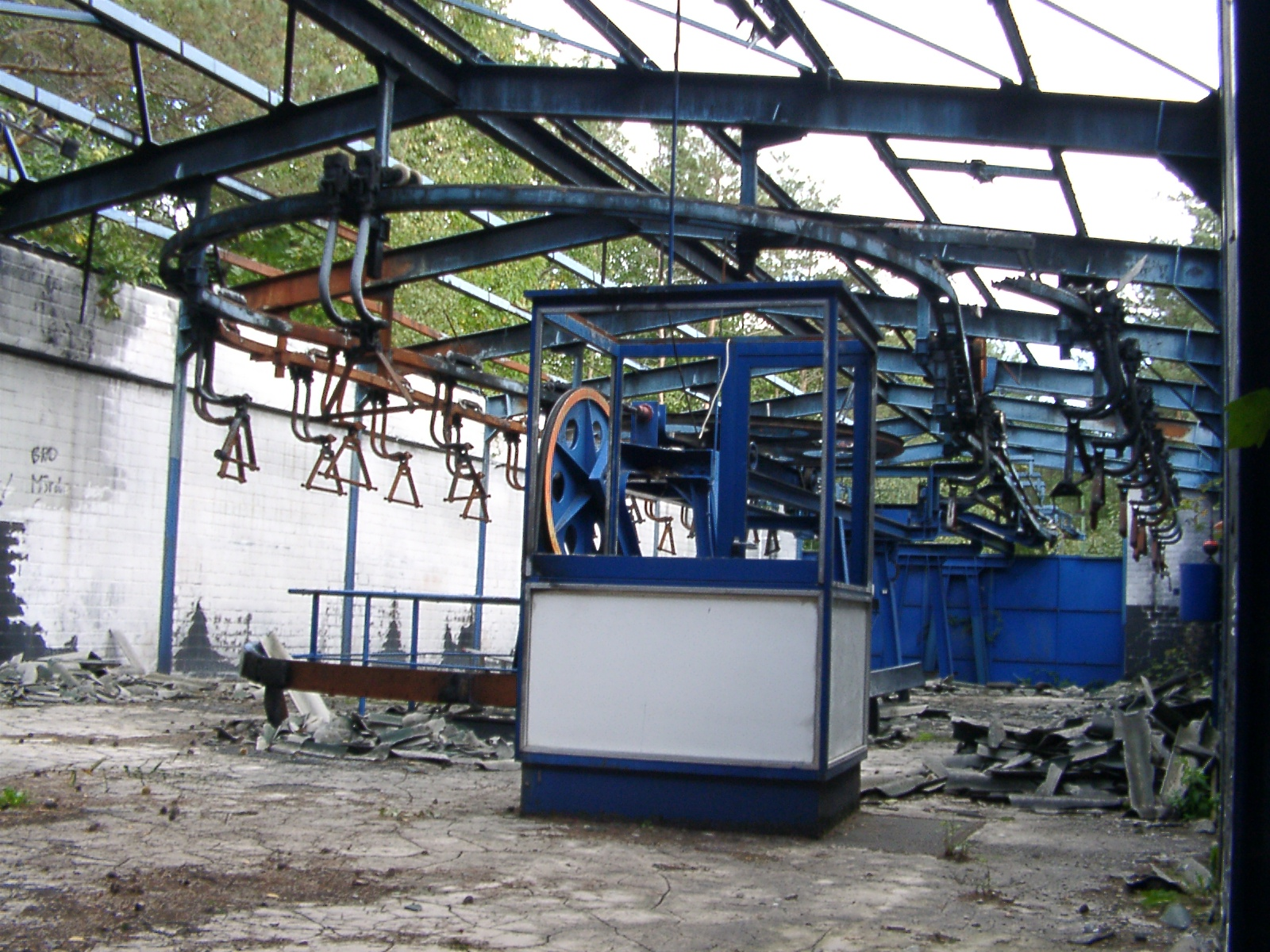
The burnt-out mountain station in 2004

The Bad Dürkheim lift (German: Bad Dürkheimer Gondelbahn) was a gondola lift located in Bad Dürkheim (in the German state of Rhineland-Palatinate). From 1973 on, it linked the Wurstmarkt in the city centre with the Teufelsstein in the Haardt Mountains, situated to the northwest of the lower station. Set down on eight pillars, the cableway bridged a distance of 1,270 metres at a height difference of 165 metres, featuring 43 small cabins.

Service on the gondola lift was abandoned in 1981, when some residents denied the right to let their estates be crossed. The owner acquired new easements in 1999, theoretically allowing for the cable car to run again. However, the summit station and a large number of cabins burnt out in a 2000 arson attack. As a result of the arson, the pillars were removed in 2005.

In December 2006, the state of Rhineland-Palatinate approved the reconstruction of the system. The current owner expected it to be fully operational by 2008.

In 2018, demolition work began on the valley station.
