= Jakab-hegy =

Mountain in Hungary

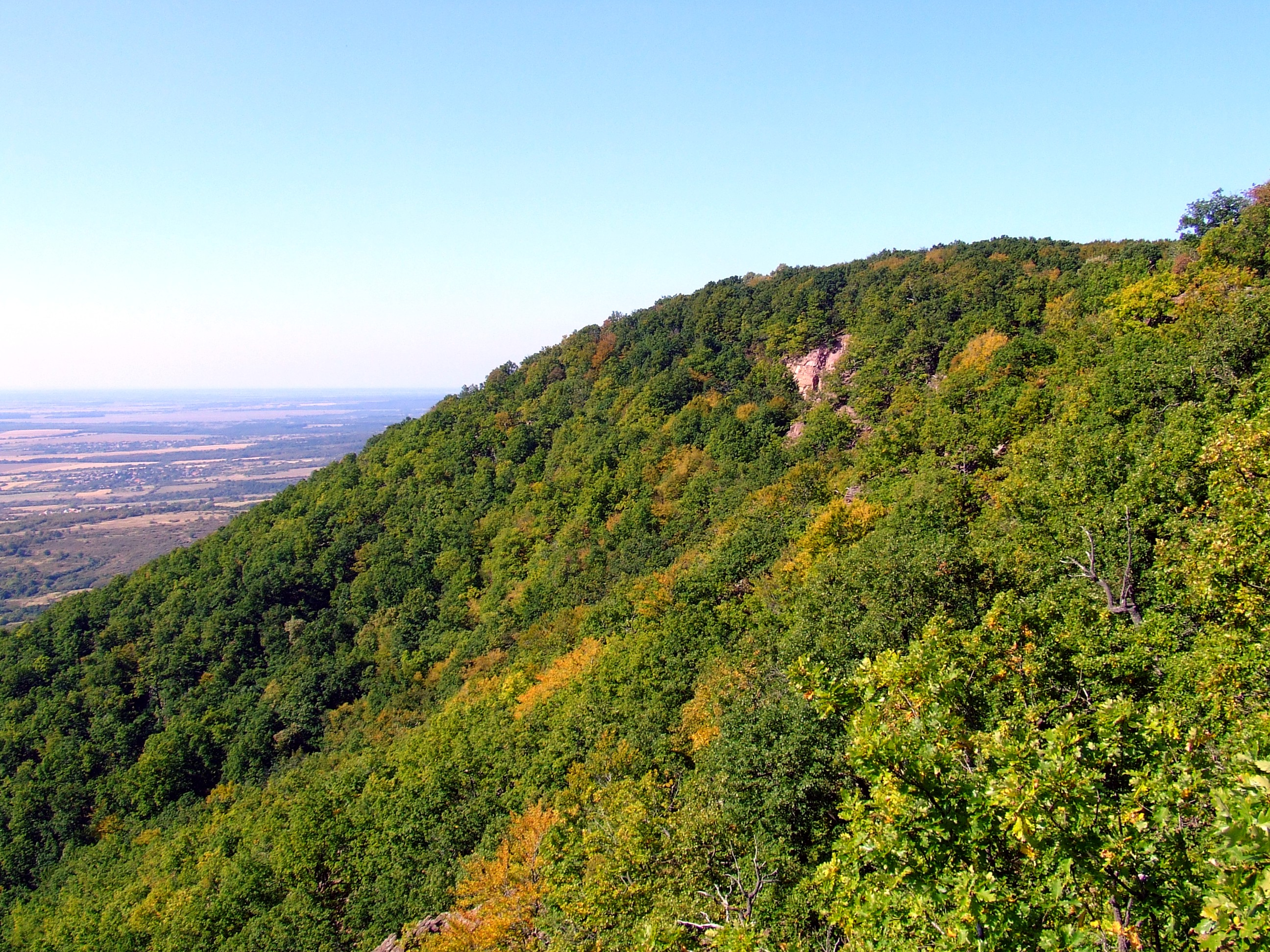

Highest point
- Elevation: 602 m (1,975 ft)
- Coordinates: 46°5′35″N 18°8′25″E

Naming
- Language of name: Hungarian

Geography
- Location within Hungary
- Location: Baranya county, Hungary
- Parent range: Mecsek, Transdanubia

Jakab-hegy (James's Hill) is a mountain in the Mecsek range in Hungary. Its highest point is 602 metres (1,975 ft) above sea level, making it the fourth-highest peak in the Mecsek after Zengő, Tubes and Hármas-hegy. The hill is known for its various geological formations and historic sites.

== Geology ==
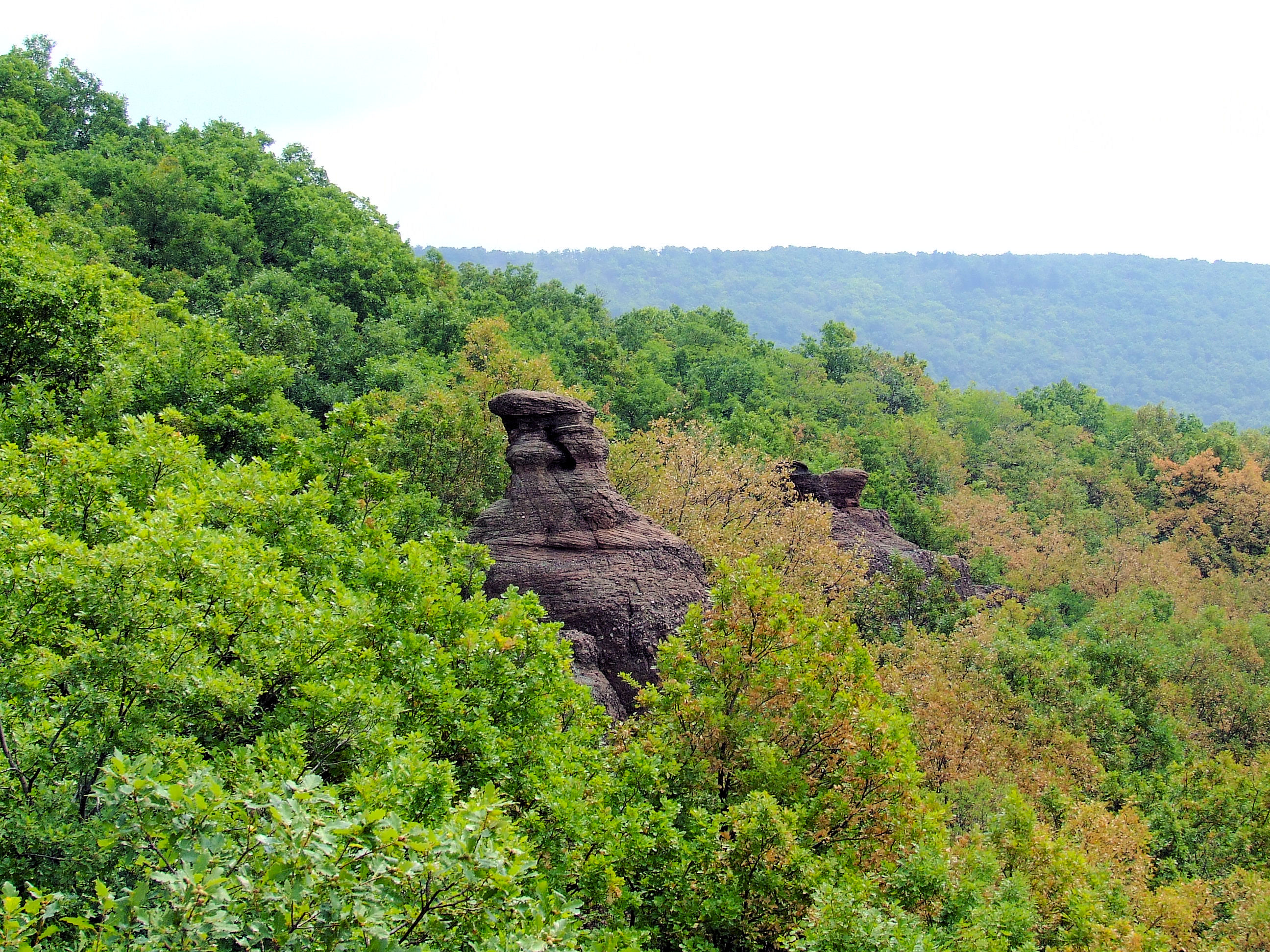
The Babás Szerkövek

The mountain was mostly formed during the Paleozoic Era and consists of Permian sandstone. The erosion of sandstone created the natural sites of the hill: the Babás Szerkövek (literally, "man-like stones in a row") and Zsongorkő (Zsongor's stone).

Jakab-hegy contains the only significant uranium-reserve in Hungary. Mining began in the 1950s with the help of the Soviet Union and served both the Russian nuclear arsenal and Hungary's Paks Nuclear Power Plant near the small town of Paks. Due to the high costs of production and the relatively low price of uranium after the Cold War the mines were closed in the 1990s.

== History ==
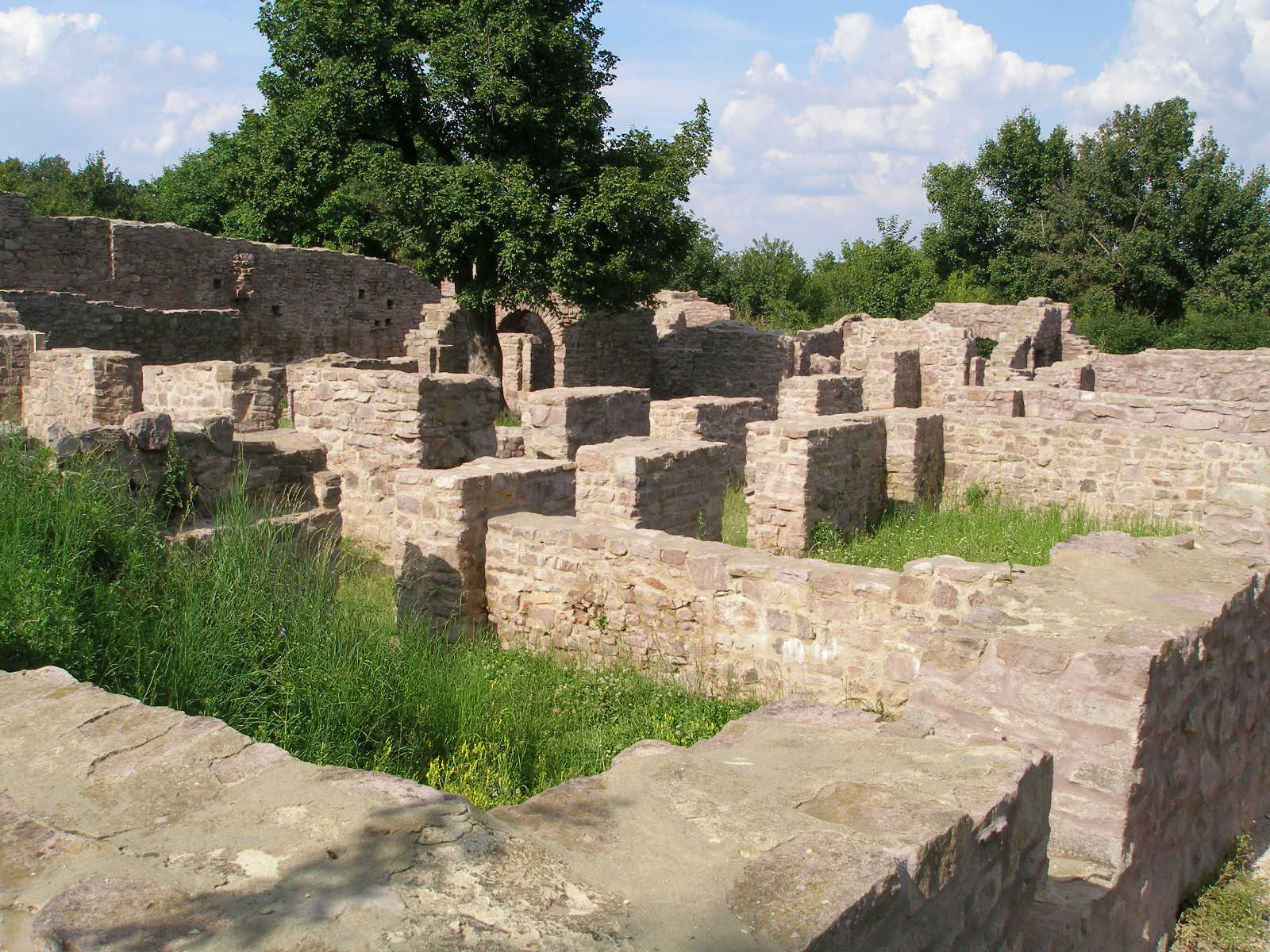
The Pauline Monastery of Jakab-hegy

The plateau of Jakab-hegy provided an attractive opportunity for human settlement. During the Iron Age, a huge fort was created upon the earlier encampments which became an important oppidum and political centre of the Hallstatt culture and later the Celts. The fort was abandoned due to Roman conquest, however, its ramparts are still visible.

During the Middle Ages a small village was formed inside the then-abandoned fort. Its church's patron saint was James the Great, thus gained the hill its name. In 1225, a monastery was built upon the church for the local hermits by the Bishop of Pécs. The Order of Saint Paul the First Hermit partially stemmed from this community. The monastery was abandoned during the Ottoman occupation, but was renovated and expanded in the 18th century. It fell into disrepair after the monastic order was outlawed by Joseph II, Holy Roman Emperor in 1780. Today only the monastery's preserved ruins remain.

== Legends ==
Many legends are related to the hill, mostly from the medieval and early modern period.

According to a legend from Kővágószőlős, the Babás Szerkövek are people turned to stone. Two wealthy families wanted to hold a wedding ceremony at the same time in the monastery. However, one of the antagonistic families were already on their way back to the village from the hill, when the other was just heading for the monastery. They met halfway, where the pathway was not wide enough for both families to pass at the same time. Both sides swore that they would rather be turned to stone than let the other pass, so they were indeed turned to stone.

Zsongorkő is said to gain its name from Hungarian warrior Zsongor, who lived in the time of the Ottoman occupation. He had to leave his home-village for rightfully killing a Turkish soldier and joined the military of Royal Hungary. When his fiancée was captured by the Turks, he led a small party to her rescue. Although they were able to free her, the Turkish soldiers cornered them on the hill. Zsongor and his spouse jumped to their deaths from the eponymous stone rather than being captured.

== See also ==
- Celtic Castle on Jakob's Hill
