= Kriemhildenstuhl =

Old Roman quarry in Germany

Coordinates: 49°27′50″N 8°09′31″E

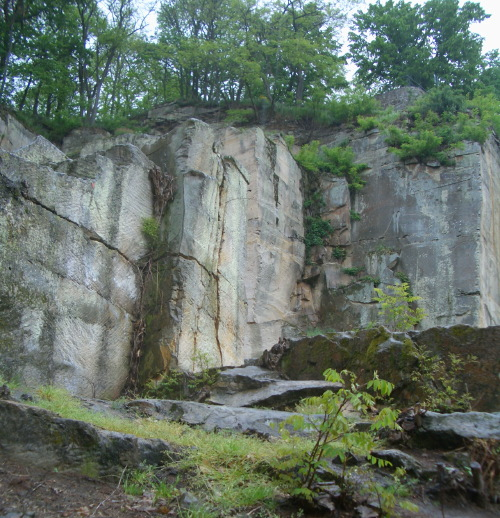
Partial view of the Kriemhildenstuhl

The Kriemhildenstuhl, more rarely Krimhildenstuhl (short i), in the forests around the Palatine county town of Bad Dürkheim in the German state of Rhineland-Palatinate, is an old Roman quarry, which was worked by the 22nd Legion of the Roman Army, who were stationed in Mogontiacum (Mainz) around 200 A. D.

The site has been designated as an area monument (Denkmalzone) and is owned by the Drachenfels Club.

== Location ==
The Kriemhildenstuhl lies left of the small river of the Isenach northwest of Bad Dürkheim at a height of 250 metres above sea level on the southeastern hillside of the 300-metre-high Kästenberg. The latter is a southern spur of the Teufelsstein, which belongs to the Haardt mountains which form the eastern perimeter of the Palatine Forest range, facing the Upper Rhine Plain. Immediately above the quarry is the Heidenmauer, a 26 hectare fortified Celtic settlement from the late Hallstatt era. The Brunhildisstuhl a little below the Kriemhildenstuhl was probably another a Roman quarry. Other old Roman quarries in the vicinity are found in the Kallstadter Tälchen valley and on the Weilerskopf.

== Excavation history ==
=== Early excavations ===
In the Middle Ages the quarry was erroneously linked to the Burgundians and the Nibelungenlied. Archaeological excavations were carried out in 1884, 1893/94, 1916/17, 1934/35 and 1937–1939. In the Nazi era, unsuccessful attempts were made to prove, as a result of excavations that the quarry was an Old Germanic cult site.

=== Recent excavations ===
As a result of excavations in the second half of the 20th century, new information surfaced about the technology and worker organisation of the Romans and brought new inscriptions to light.

==== Technology and work organisation ====
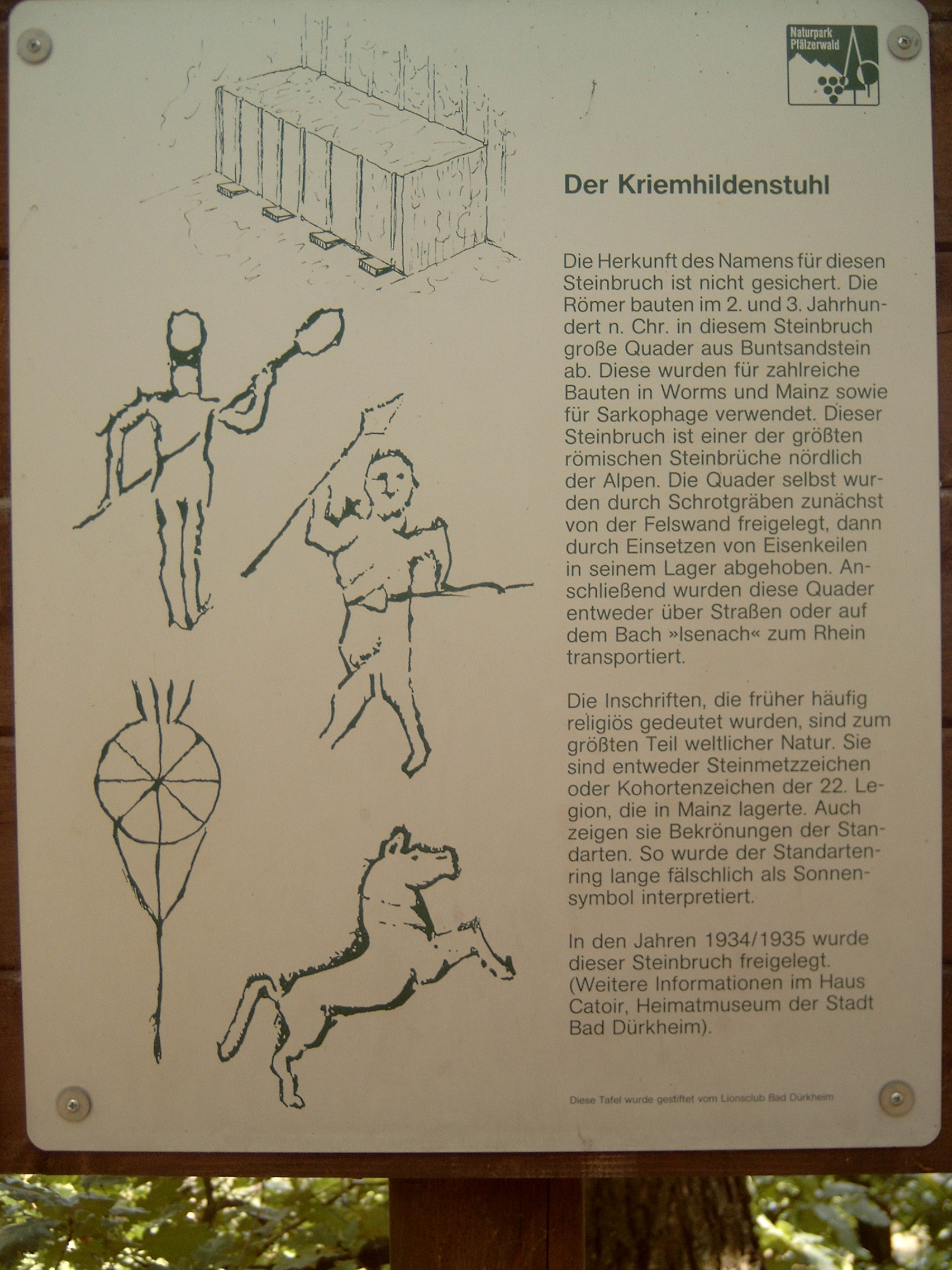
Information board at the quarry with diagrams and drawings

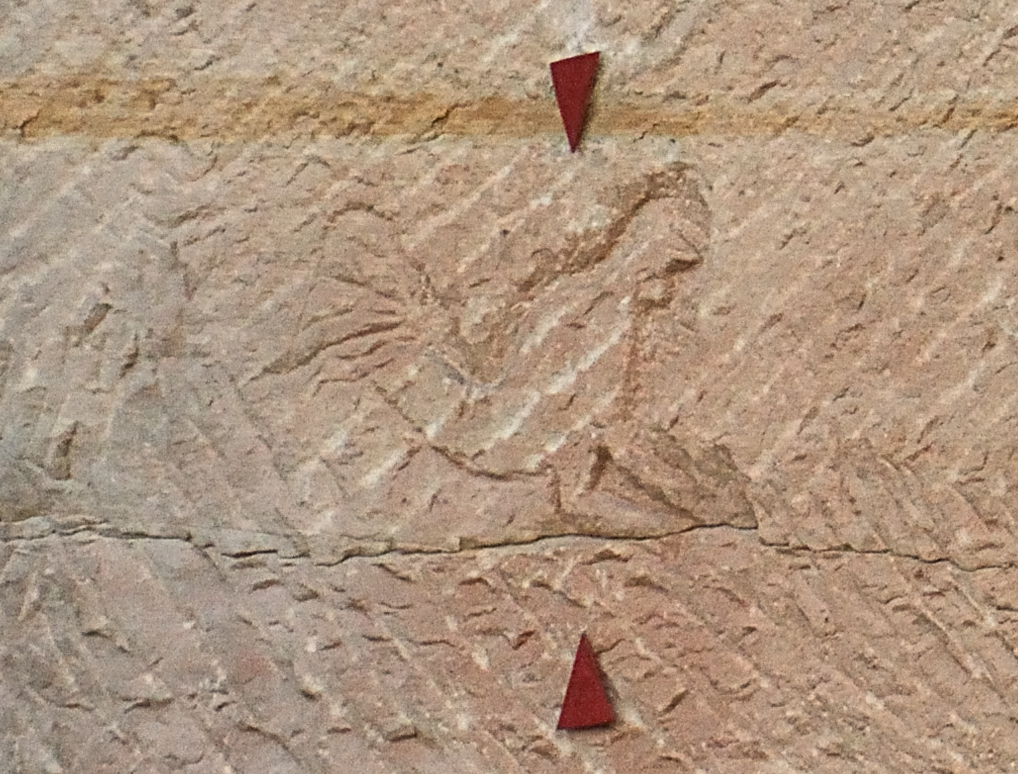
Field badge of the 22nd Legion

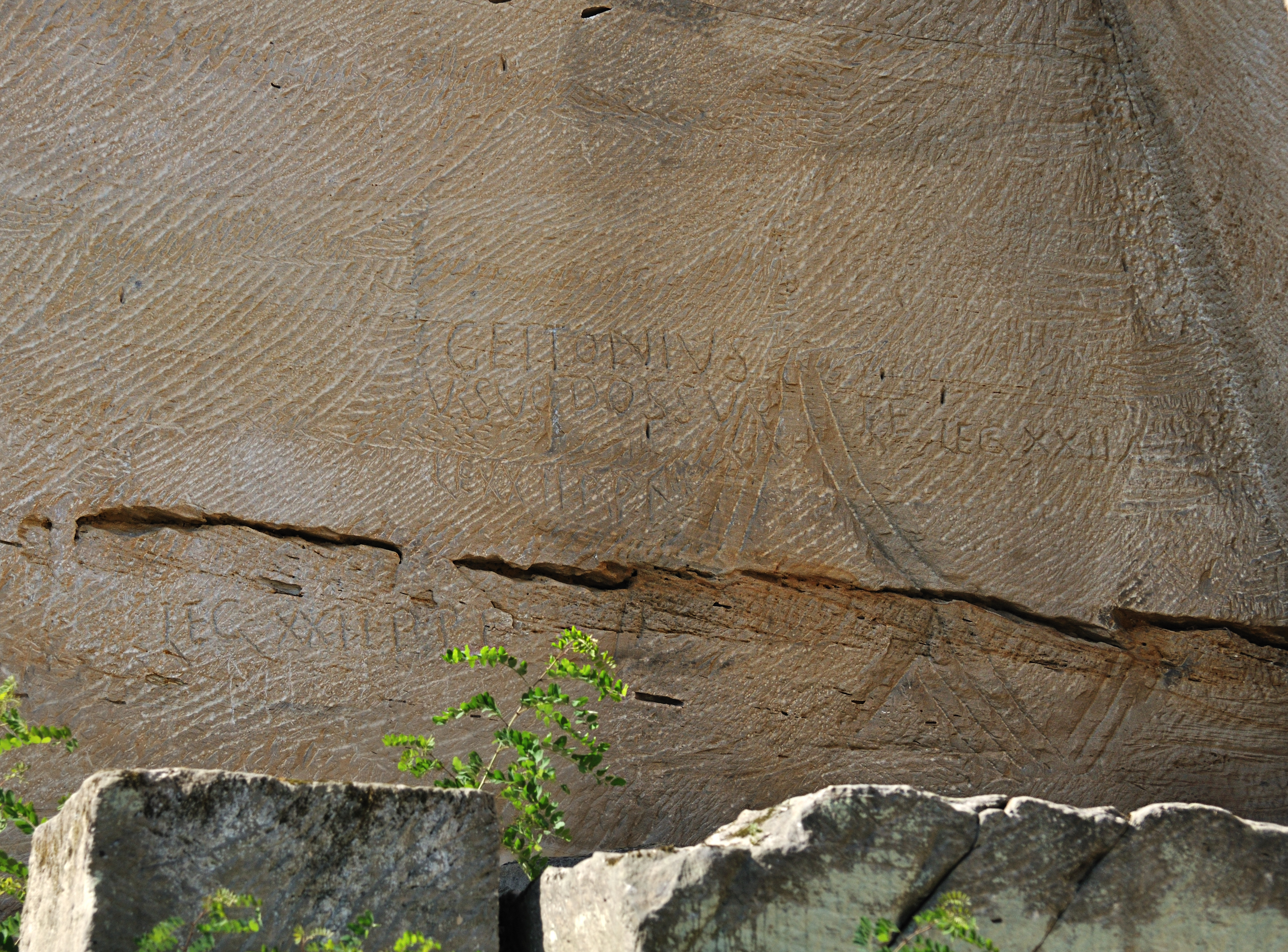
Inscription of 3 legionnaires

In the semi-circular quarry, whitish quartzitic sandstone of the Karlstal beds of the Middle Bunter was extracted. Because quarrying was carried out near the plateau, the rock was presumably only covered by a thin layer of earth.

Quarrying was undertaken using several working parties, so-called Arbeitsköpfe. Individual Arbeitsköpfe were 25 metres above the next level below.

From hammer marks on the rock, it is evident that the blocks of stone were between 1.20 and 3 metres long, between 0.6 and 1.4 metres wide and up to 0.6 metres high. Occasionally, capitals and round stones, perhaps for columns, made. The blocks were initially cut out of the rock face on two sides with sledgehammers, then the underside was loosened with Setzkellen. Both types of tool were discovered during the excavations.

The transport channel, down which the blocks were moved on slides and rollers into the valley, is still easily recognisable.

==== Inscriptions and drawings ====
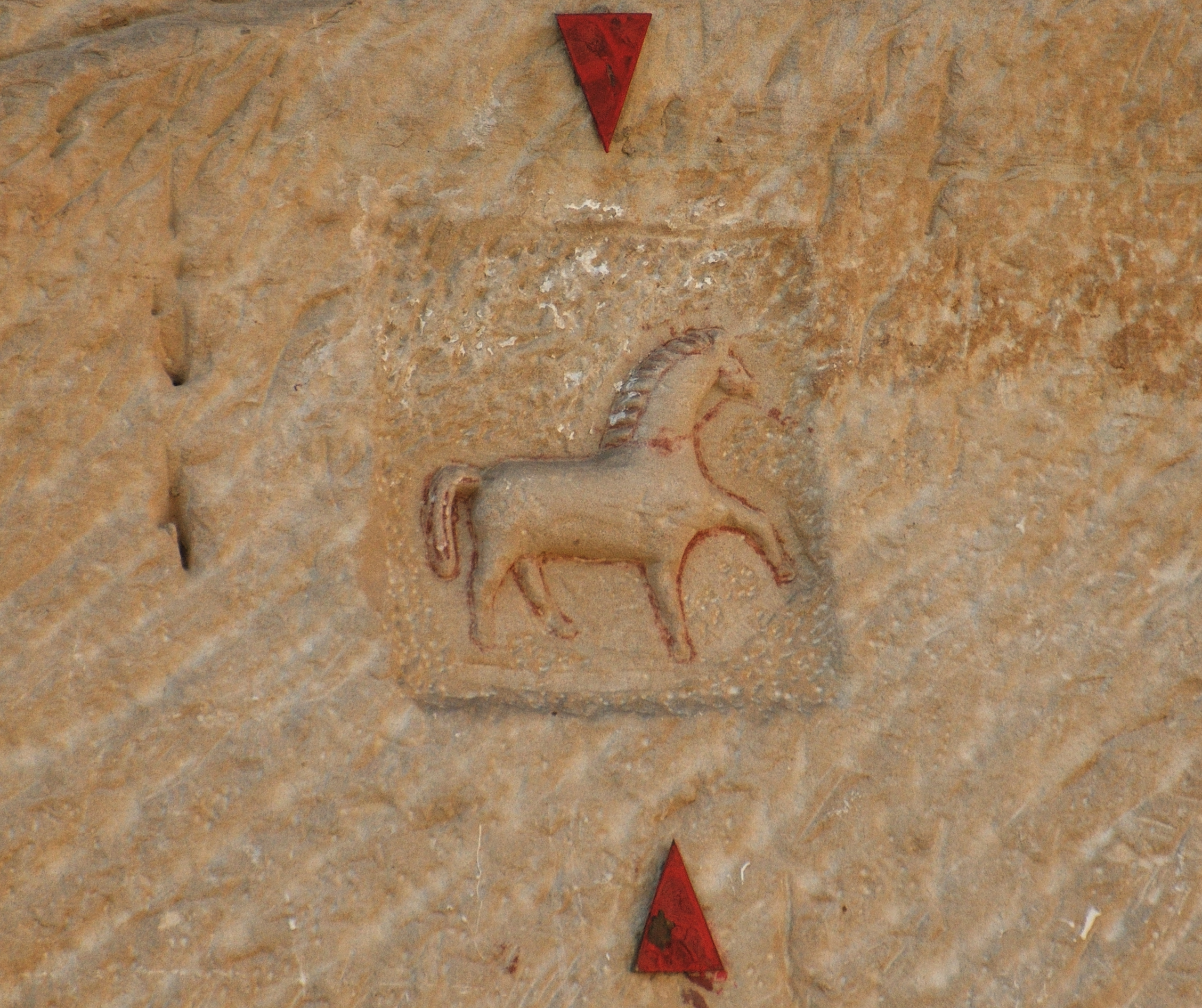
One of the horse pictures

Because the lower levels of the quarry filled up with waste material during the quarrying operations, the traces of Roman tools and inscriptions and drawings here were very well preserved.

Work inscriptions

- (angulus) Aici = Arbeitskopf of the Aicus
- (H)ostili Geniali angulus Quin(ti) Purpurionis = To Hostilis Genialis (is allocated) the Arbeitskopf of Quintus Purpurio
- (angulus) Septimi VI id Aug = (Arbeitskopf) of the Septimus (handed over) on 8 August

Legion inscriptions

- I(ovi) O(ptimo) M(aximo)/ET GENIO/I(m)PERATORE/LVC(Lucio) SEPTIMO/SEVERO VEX(i)L(latio) L(egionis) XXII P(iae) F(idelis) = Dedication to Jupiter and the Genius of the Emperor Septimius Severus by the division of the 22nd Legion, the upright and true
- ob m(emoriam) Dat(ivi) Pr(o)c(uli) S(igniferi) = in memory of the standard bearer, Dativus Proculus
- Natalis m(iles) l(egionis) XXII p(iae) f(idelis) = Natalis, soldier of the 22nd Legion, the upright and true
- Vog(e)llin(us) Perpet(uus) Leg(ionis) XXII P(iae) = Vogellinus Perpetuus, (member of) the 22nd Legion, the upright
- Gettonius/Ursus Dossus(S)/LE LEG XXII A/LEG XXII P PF = Gettonius, Ursus and Dossus, soldiers of the Legio XXII Antoniniana(?) Legio XXII p(rimigeniae) p(iae) f(idelis) 22nd Legion, the foremost, true and upright

Drawings

- There are drawings of horses, which may be the symbol of the unit working here, as well as drawings of men, phalli and vulvas. Whether the sexual symbols were aspects of a pagan cult or more like present-day toilet graffiti is difficult to determine.
- The wheel symbols and swastikas could be religious symbols or just workers' marks.

== Literature ==
- Hans Schleif (1938), Die SS-Ausgrabung am "Kriemhildenstuhl" bei Bad Dürkheim : 1. Vorbericht (in German), Germanien, pp. 289–296
- Hans Schleif (1939), Die SS-Ausgrabung am "Kriemhildenstuhl" bei Bad Dürkheim : 2. Vorbericht (in German), Germanien, pp. 340–345
- Friedrich Sprater (1948), Limburg und Kriemhildenstuhl (in German), Speyer: Verlag des Historischen Museums der Pfalz
- Helmut Naumann (1965), "Brunoldes Stul", Mitteilungen des Historischen Vereins der Pfalz (in German), no. 63, pp. 34–94
- Josef Röder (1969), "Der Kriemhildenstuhl", Mitteilungen des Historischen Vereins der Pfalz (in German), no. 67, pp. 110–132
- Helmut Bernhard (2002), Karl-Heinz Rothenberger; Karl Scherer; Franz Staab; Jürgen Keddigkeit (eds.), "Der römische Steinbruch "Krimhildenstuhl" bei Bad Dürkheim", Pfälzische Geschichte (in German), vol. 1 (2nd, improved ed.), Kaiserslautern: Institut für pfälzische Geschichte und Volkskunde, pp. 88 ff
- Thomas Kreckel: "Sonnenheiligtum" und "Kultburg". Die Geschichte der Grabungen auf der "Heidenmauer" und im "Kriemhildenstuhl" bei Bad Dürkheim in den 1930er Jahren, in: Egon Schallmayer, Katharina von Kurzynski (eds.): Archäologie und Politik. Archäologische Ausgrabungen der 30er und 40er Jahre des 20. Jahrhunderts im zeitgeschichtlichen Kontext; Internationale Tagung anläßlich "75 Jahre Ausgrabungen am Glauberg" from 16 to 17 October 2008 in Nidda-Bad Salzhausen, Bonn, 2011, pp. 271–278.
