= Heidenmauer (Palatinate) =

Celtic ruins near Bad Dürkheim, Rhineland-Palatinate, Germany

- Bad Dürkheim
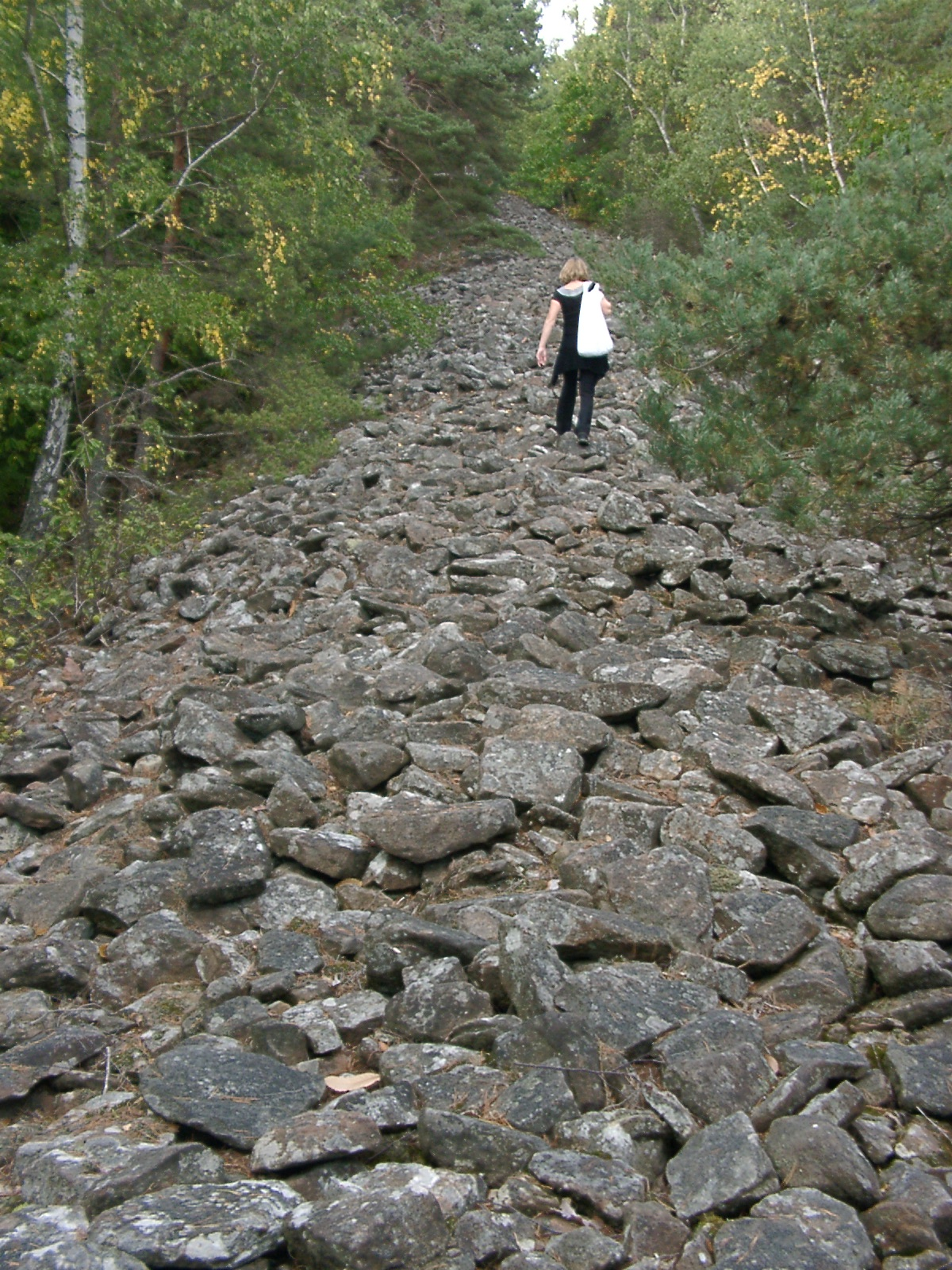
- The ruins of the Heidenmauer

Site information
- Type: hill castle
- Code: DE-RP
- Condition: niedergelegt

Location
- Coordinates: 49°27′52″N 8°09′16″E
- Height: 300 m above sea level (NN)

Site history
- Built: around 500 B.C.
- Materials: formerly the Murus Gallicus

The Heidenmauer ("heathen wall") near the Palatine county town of Bad Dürkheim in the German state of Rhineland-Palatinate is a circular rampart or ringwork, two and a half kilometres long, which was built by the Celts around 500 B. C. as a type of Murus Gallicus but was pulled down again not long afterwards. The wooden elements of the wall have disappeared over the course of time by rotting away, but the stones have survived.

The Heidenmauer is a cultural monument according to the protected monument act of Rhineland-Palatinate.

== Geography ==
=== Location ===
The site lies one kilometre northwest of Bad Dürkheim, 170 metres above the town, and covers the 300-metre-high, domed summit of the hill and its southeastern hillside of the Kästenberg. The latter is a southern spur of the Teufelsstein, which is part of the Haardt, the eastern range of the Palatinate Forest facing the Upper Rhine Plain. South of the hillfort the little river of Isenach, a left tributary of the Rhine, breaks through the mountain barrier and enters the plain.

=== Surrounding area ===
To the left and below the former entrance of the Heidenmauer is the old Roman quarry of Kriemhildenstuhl. On the summit of the Teufelstein, a few hundred metres away, is the monolith of the same name, which may have been the location of religious rites in Celtic times. High above the southern bank of the Isenach lie the ruins of two medieval sites: the Hardenburg and, further downstream, the Benedictine abbey of Limburg.

== History ==
The Heidenmauer and its associated settlement were established at the end of the Hallstatt period around 500 B. C. by a Celtic tribe that cannot be more specifically identified. Copious numbers of pottery finds have enabled a very precise dating. Almost all the containers are hand-made, only a few show traces of having been turned; this technology first appeared after c. 500 B. C. in the La Tène period. Other finds included iron, long knives (Hiebmesser) as well as querns (Napoleonshüte), pyramidal stones that were stuck point-down in the ground in order to provide the base for the milling of corn. In addition there is also evidence of milk production and iron smelting.

Based on the finds, it appears that the settlers traded in pottery products from Upper Italy and especially from Ancient Greece. When, at the beginning of the La Tène period, the Greeks moved their trade routes to the Iberian Peninsula and the islands of the western Mediterranean, the settlers lost the source of their supply. Probably as a result of this, the settlement was only occupied by one generation, i.e. for 30 to 40 years. This is ascertainable from the under 20 cm thick settlement layer over the natural earth and from extremely rare improvements in the surviving base of the wall. There are no traces of fire nor conflict, so all sources indicate a peaceful settlement. The dismantling of the wall may have been to prevent a rival tribe from using the structure.

In the 4th century A. D. a small part of the circular rampart as well as the Kriemhildenstuhl below was used by the Romans as a quarry.

== Research history ==
After those parts of Electoral Palatinate that were west of the Rhine had been awarded to the Kingdom of Bavaria in 1815, Bavarian state surveyors became interested in the Heidenmauer. However, investigations were first undertaken in 1874/75 by student, Christian Mehlis, who later became a teacher of history and ancient languages in Neustadt an der Haardt.

In 1937–39, Hans Schleif carried out the first excavations as part of the SS-associated project, Ahnenerbe, but these had to stop with the outbreak of the Second World War. Schleif thought he had uncovered a Germanic religious site, perhaps because he had mistaken a Roman marking in the Kriemhildenstuhl quarry below the Heidenmauer as a swastika.

From 2004 to 2006, excavations were undertaken by the Speyer Archaeological Monument Conservation Authority (Archäologische Denkmalpflege Speyer) as part of the Early Celtic Princely Residence programme (Frühkeltische Fürstensitze) financed by the Deutsche Forschungsgemeinschaft. The excavation leader was Thomas Kreckel. The project aims to validate the results, which are published inter alia in the daily paper, Die Rheinpfalz, of links to other Celtic relicts in the local area. These include Celtic remains on the terrain of Limburg Abbey two kilometres to the southwest, high above the southern, far side, of the Isenach river. If the excavations are validated, they should corroborate the view that the impulse for the settlement inside the Heidenmauer came from the Limburg Plateau, which had already been occupied by the Celts who remained there until the land was taken by the Romans (1st century B. C.).

== Layout ==
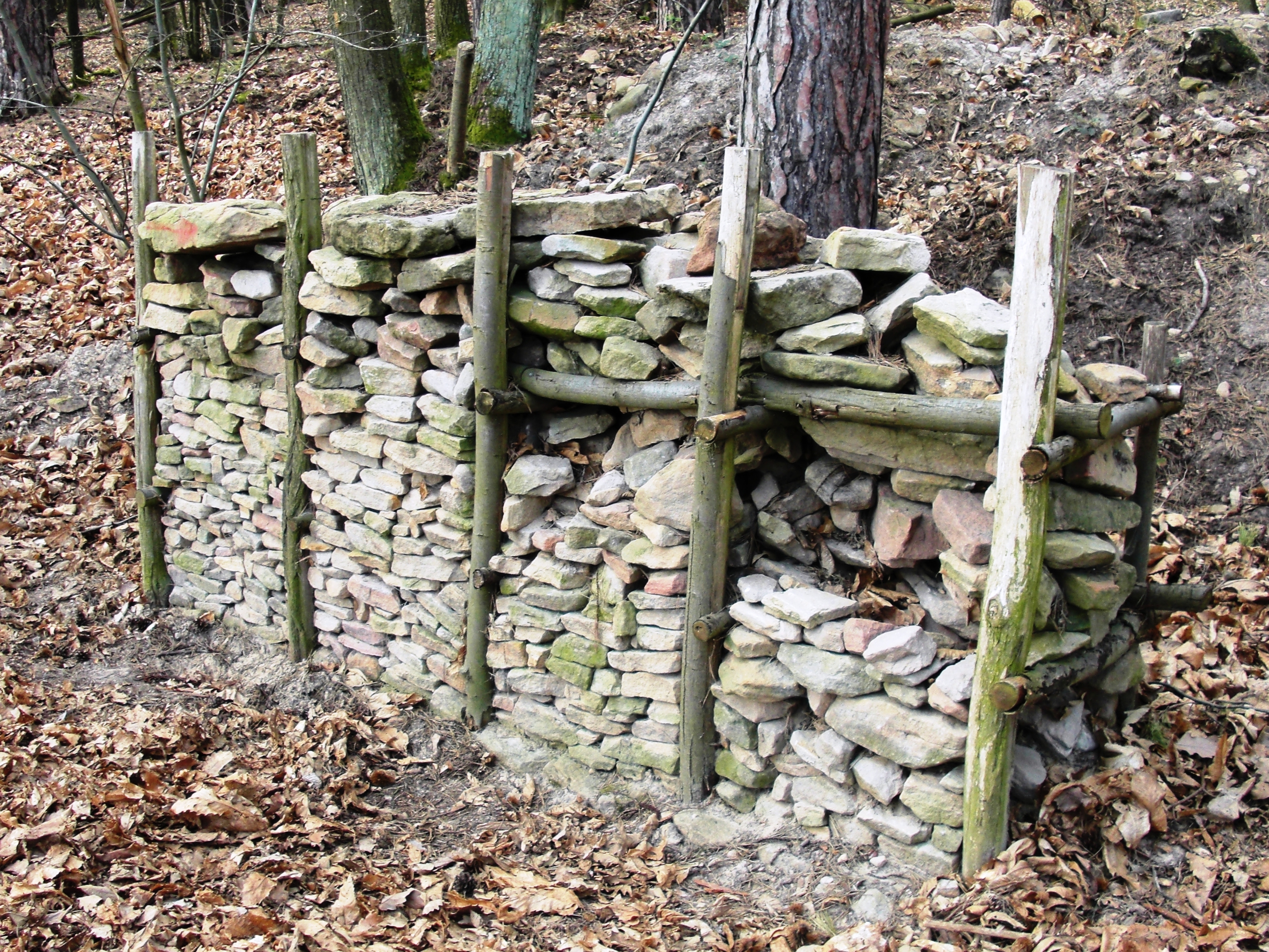
Small reconstruction of the Heidenmauer

The ringwork of the Heidenmauer consists of the rampart-like, apparently demolished stone wall. It surrounds the remains of a settlement, some of which lay open for centuries and some of which was not uncovered until it was excavated.

The rampart is two and a half kilometres long in toto and encloses and area of 26 hectares. From its northernmost point to the southernmost corner is about 700 metres; from the westernmost to the easternmost corner is about 600 metres. The plan of the site is in the shape of a bow with its bowstring pulled back ready to fire. The bow extends from west through north to east, the bowstring forms and almost right-angled point facing south. Where the bow and bowstring meet in the east at the lowest point of the site (260 metres), there is a roughly seven metre wide gate with a roughly nine metre long entranceway with two lanes separated by a row of stones that are still visible today. The entrance was probably covered by a wooden gateway structure.

The wall itself, a so-called Murus Gallicus, comprised a wooden frame constructed of vertical posts and horizontal crossbeams which was filled with dry rubble stone. The smooth sides of the stones formed the external facade. The spaces in between were largely filled with sand. Because the wooden elements have disappeared apart from a few remains (hence the reason it is sometimes called a Pfostenschlitzmauer or "post-slot wall"), the height of the original wall can only be indirectly estimated from current measurements. The profile of the present stone rampart tapers towards the top; at its base it is 15–20 metres thick; at the crest, three to four metres. Its height is between three and ten metres.

Archaeologists suspect that, about 80 metres south of the gateway and above the Kriemhildenstuhl, was a bastion. There the rocks of the wall are facing inwards, which suggests that at this spot, which enables a wide view of the Rhine Plain and the entrance to the Isenach valley, a wooden tower was erected, overlooking the wall.

In front of the arc of the northwestern wall, whose highest points run over the crest of the hill (at 285–300 metres above sea level), is a nearly 500-metre-long and up to 15-metre-wide ditch, which on the very flat summit was clearly intended to increase the height from the ground to the top of the wall. The ditch bends towards the northeast at the northernmost point of the wall, almost forming a right angle, and runs downhill before it ends after a distance of over 100 metres. In this way, during heavy rain, the water from the ditch was led away, preventing it from undermining the wall.

In local folklore there is another legendary story of its origin: Hans von Trotha (around 1450–1503), a castellan regionally known as the robber baron, Hans Trapp, of the South Palatine castle of Bertwartstein (who almost certainly never visited the Heidenmauer site which had already fallen into ruins 2000 years ago), was supposed to have hidden a large supply of sausage in the ditch; this legend gave rise to its popular name, the Wurstgraben ("sausage ditch").

In the area enclosed by the wall are numerous small hillocks of different sizes. These are likely to be the remains of the domestic buildings that have yet to be explored; only a fragment of a floor of beaten clay has been exposed. For this reason, no conclusions can yet be drawn about the number of people who lived here. However, in view of the artefacts found, it was probably an extensive settlement.

In the northern part of the site a spring reaches the surface, whose superfluous water may also have flowed to the northeastern ditch. During the time span of the settlement the site was largely treeless; in the 20th century it was deliberated reforested.

== Literature ==
- Helmut Bernhard; Thomas Kreckel (2006), Frühe Kelten im Raum Bad Dürkheim, Rheinland-Pfalz (in German), Tübingen
- James Fenimore Cooper (2001), Die Heidenmauer oder die Benediktiner : Roman um die Zerstörung der Limburg. Neu übersetzt und herausgegeben von Paul Johann Klebs (in German), Ludwigshafen am Rhein: Pro Message, ISBN 3-934845-07-X
- Walter Eitelmann (1998), Rittersteine im Pfälzerwald (in German) (4th ed.), Neustadt an der Weinstraße: Pfälzerwald-Verein, ISBN 3-00-003544-3
- Arndt Hartung; Walter Hartung (1985), Pfälzer Burgenbrevier : Aufbaustudien (in German) (6th ed.), Ludwigshafen am Rhein: Pfälzische Verlagsanstalt, ISBN 3-9801043-0-3
- Thomas Kreckel, "Die frühkeltische Befestigungsmauer "Heidenmauer" bei Bad Dürkheim, Kreis Bad Dürkheim", Archäologie in Rheinland-Pfalz 2004 (in German), pp. 29–32
