= Teufelsstein (Haardt) =

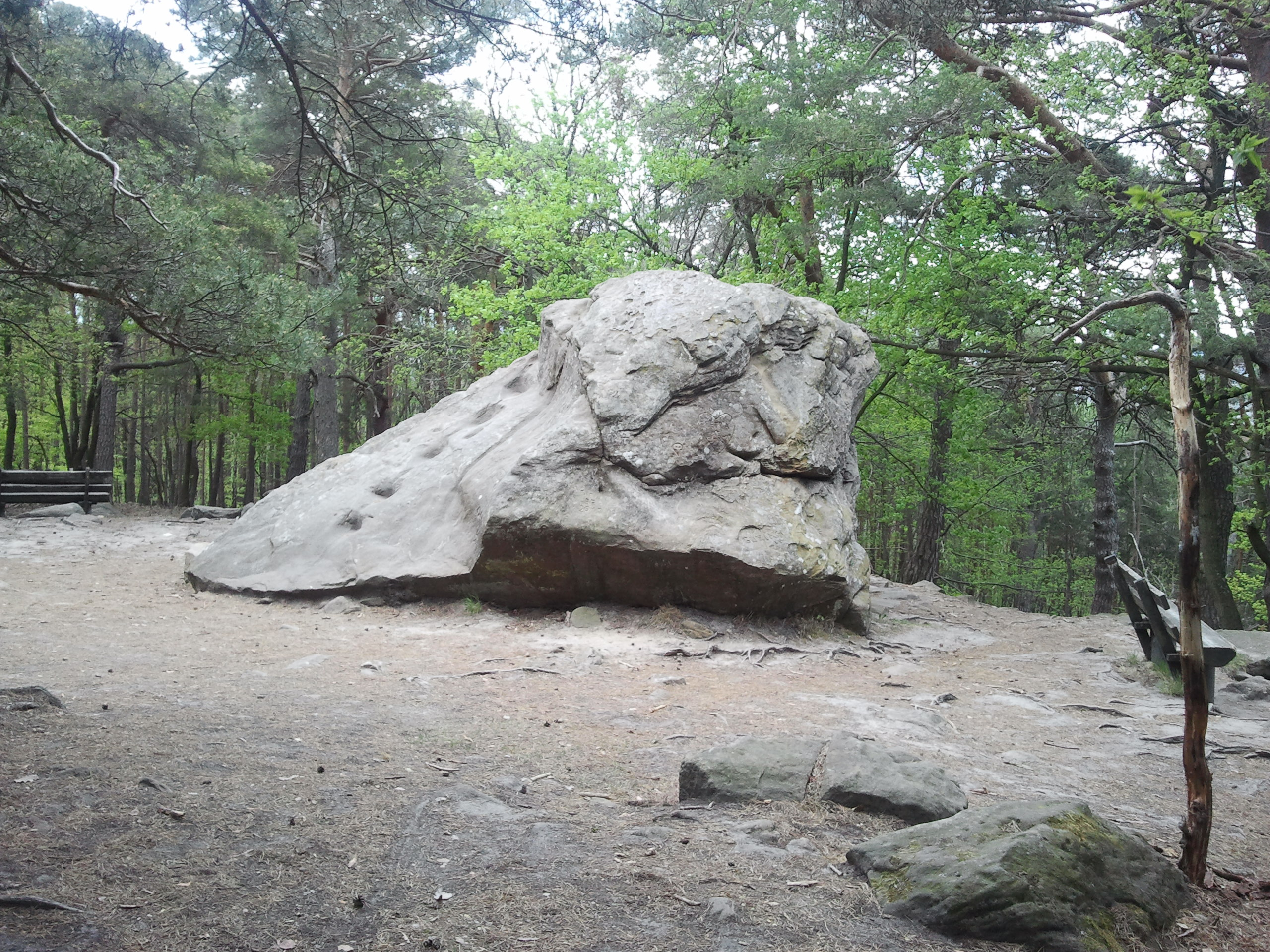

Highest point
- Elevation: 317 m above sea level (NN) (1,040 ft)
- Coordinates: 49°28′12″N 8°08′54″E

Geography
- Location within Rhineland-Palatinate
- Location: Palatinate Forest, Rhineland-Palatinate, Germany
- Parent range: Haardt

The Teufelsstein in the Haardt mountains, near the Palatine county town of Bad Dürkheim in the German state of Rhineland-Palatinate, is a hill 317 m above sea level (NN). On its domed summit is a monolith of the same name (which means "Devil's Rock"). Traces of human activity on the rock indicate that it acted as a cult object in former times.

== Geography ==
The hill, which is a southeastern spur of the 487-metre-high Peterskopf massif, lies north of where the River Isenach breaks out of the Palatinate Forest mountains into the hill country of the Weinstraße and Upper Rhine Plain. From its summit, which nowadays is wooded, there is an all-round view over the Rhine Plain to the east, the Palatinate Forest to the west, and its eastern mountain range, the Haardt, which runs from north to south.

Until 1981, when it was closed for legal reasons, a gondola lift ran from the site of the Dürkheimer Wurstmarkt, the Brühlwiesen, in a northwesterly direction up to the top of the Teufelsstein.

A southern outlier, which is also part of the Peterskopf massif, is the 300-metre-high Kästenberg (Pal. for Kastanienberg or "chestnut hill"), is host to the remains of the Heidenmauer, a large Celtic settlement with a 2.5 km long circular wall, which was built around 500 B. C., as well as the Roman quarry, the Kriemhildenstuhl, which was used until the 4th century A. D.

== Name ==
The Teufelsstein, which gave the hill its name, is a rock formation about 2.50 metres high and up to 4 metres wide. Five steps have been carved into the rock, staircase-fashion, leading to the top where there is a hollow which is thought to be a sacrifice bowl (Opferschale) for religious rites of its former, probably Celtic users and from which a blood channel (Blutrinne) runs down the rock by the steps. In addition, the rock has numerous symbols carved into it, dating to various periods. As well as sun wheels, runes and Roman letters there are several markings that recall the stonemason's marks of the 12th and 13th centuries. According to older accounts, two coarsely drawn human figures as well as other carvings used to be visible as well, but they have since weathered away or been deliberately destroyed. In the near vicinity of the Teufelsstein are several large rocks which could be the remains of a former enclosure of the summit plateau.

== Legend of the Teufelsstein ==
The following local legend is told about the Teufelsstein:

Once upon a time, when Limburg Abbey was built on a hill opposite the Teufelsstein, the monks deceived the Devil into helping with its construction. They led him to believe they wanted to build an inn and in this way induced him into stacking the giant stone ashlars on top of one another. It was not until the after the building had been finished and the bells rang out for the solemn consecration of the basilica, that the Devil realised the deception. Full of wrath he wanted to take the huge boulder from the hill opposite and hurl it at the new monastery. But God protected the monks, the stone turned out to be as soft as butter. Then the Devil sat on it and left imprints of his bottom, his feet and his tail that are still visible today...

In his book Die malerische und romantische Rheinpfalz ("The Picturesque and Romantic Rhenish Palatinate") Franz Weiß wrote an epic poem about the legend of the Teufelsstein that ends as follows:

Noch ruhet auf derselben Stelle
ein stummer Zeuge und allein,
wo er entfiel dem Herrn der Hölle,
auf hohem Berg – der Teufelsstein.

"Still it rests on that same spot, a silent witness and alone, where it escaped the Lord of Hell, on a mountain high – the Devil's Stone."
