= Bismarck Tower (Kallstadt) =

Coordinates: 49°28′45″N 8°07′46″E

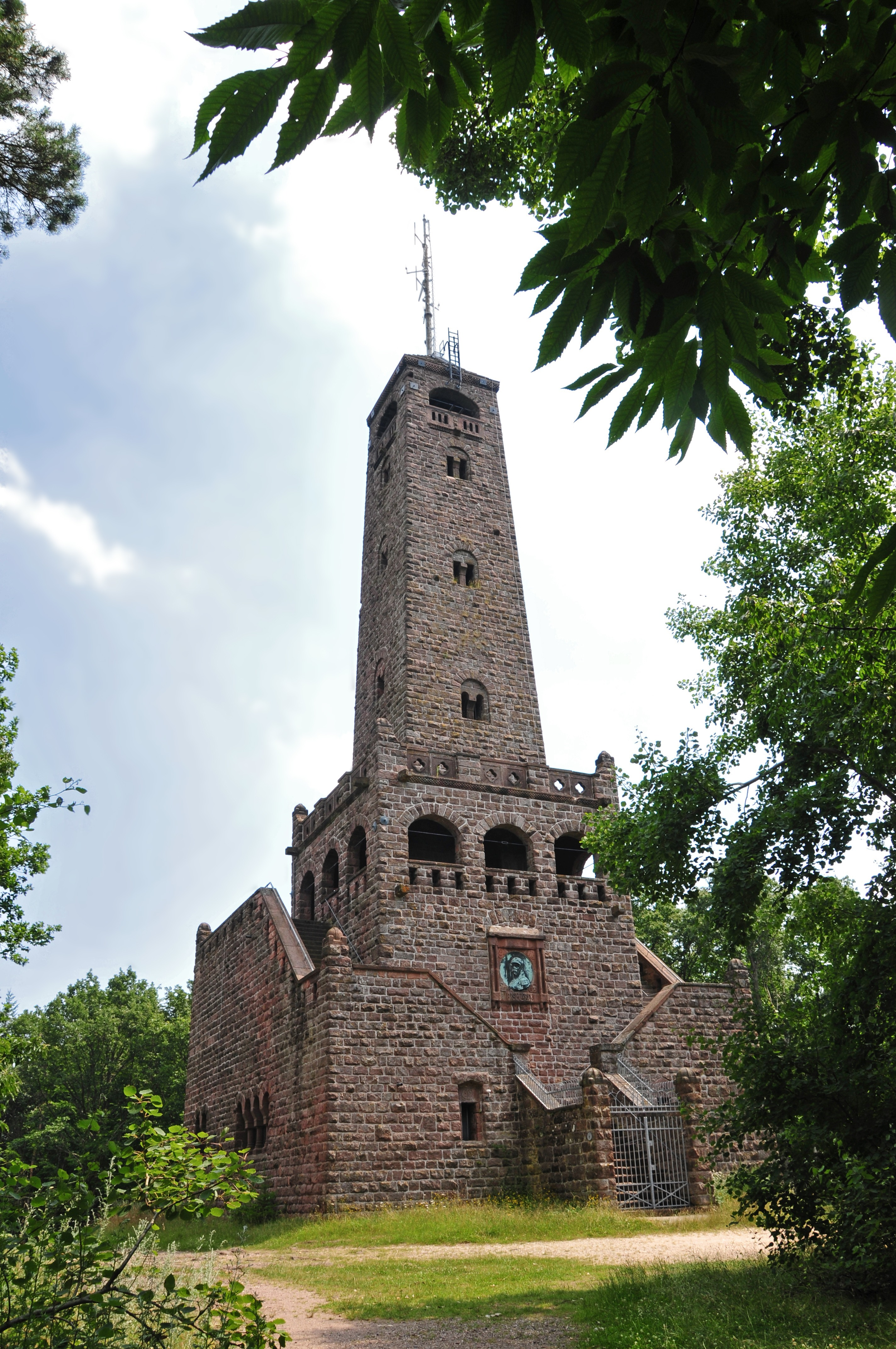
The Bismarck Tower on the Peterskopf

The Bismarck Tower (German: Bismarckturm) on the 497-metre-high Peterskopf in the Haardt mountains on the eastern edge of the Palatine Forest stands within an exclave of the municipality of Kallstadt in the German state of Rhineland-Palatinate.

== History ==
Planning for the monument dedicated to Reich chancellor, Otto von Bismarck, began in 1896 by the Drachenfels Club and it was erected in 1901 - 1903 under the direction of architect, Friedrich Kunst, from Karlsruhe.

In 1925 a concrete ceiling collapsed during a school visit to the tower. In 1928 the relief, which had been destroyed by the French, was replaced. During the Second World War two bombs hit the tower.

Its first restoration was carried out in 1949 by the Drachenfels Club, a local monument conservation society. In 1973/74 further renovation measures were implemented; this included accommodation for the tower keeper. The tower has been protected as a listed monument since 1986.

== Design ==
The tower is made from bunter sandstone which was quarried in the vicinity. It has a base area of 16.7 × 14 m^{2} and is divided into three sections.

The lower section may be climbed on 15 external steps, from which staircases lead left and right to the lower viewing platform. The second viewing platform follows after a further 20 steps, also external to the tower. An internal staircase then leads to the 30-metre-high third viewing platform. From here, there are extensive views, particularly over the Upper Rhine Plain over 400 metres below.

== Bad Dürkheim Hill Run ==
The Peterskopf and its Bismarck tower is the destination of the annual Bad Dürkheim Hill Run (Bad Dürkheimer Berglauf) which takes place in October. The route is 8,700 metres long and the total climb is 510 metres, making it the longest and steepest element of the Palatine Hill Running Cup ((Pfälzer Berglaufpokal).
