= Hans Schleif =

German Architect

Hans Philipp Oswald Schleif (23 February 1902 in Wiesbaden – 27 April 1945 in Berlin) was a German architect, architectural and classical archaeologist and member of the SS (member number 264,124), last occupying the rank of Standartenführer (since 30 January 1945). He was a member of the Nazi Party since 1937, with membership number 5,380,876.

== Archaeological projects ==
=== Greece ===
In 1936, the government of Germany provided a considerable sum of money to reactivate a moribund project of archaeological excavation on the site of Olympia, Greece. Schleif was chosen as one of the principal archaeologists in this prestigious project. His Greek work produced a number of books, notably Alt-Olympia (1935), Alt-Athen (part one 1937; part two 1939) and Erechtheion (1942).

=== Poland ===
In 1939, Schleif worked as "General Trustee for securing of German cultural goods in the former Polish territory" together with Ernst Petersen in the plunder of the Warsaw archaeological museum in Łazienki Park. He transported five crate loads to Poznań on 30 November, after Standartenführer Mühlmann had given the order for such activity to cease, and founded a new collection and museum in Poznań. He was suspended in September 1940 from the position of a general trustee in Poznań due to his misunderstanding of his function, because the Gestapo expected him to plunder public and private art and cultural objects, that he did not follow.

== Reputation ==
In contrast to some academics who were part of the Ahnenerbe, Schleif enjoyed a strong international reputation, something he shared with a handful of fellow Nazi archaeologists such as Herbert Jankuhn. Schleif was never comfortable in the Ahnenerbe, given the group's tendencies towards racial pseudo-science, and he conspired with Wolfram Sievers to delay indefinitely a scheme suggested by Gunther Kirchhoff and Karl Maria Wiligut, and endorsed by Heinrich Himmler, to excavate a valley near Kirchhoff's home town of Gaggenau after Kirchhoff had decided that it housed an ancient Teutonic religious complex.

== Death ==
On 27 April 1945, around 11 pm, Schleif killed his wife, Lora, and twin 18-month old sons Alexander and Konstantin before taking his own life.
