= Felsenberg-Berntal Nature Reserve =

Nature reserve in Rhineland-Palatinate, Germany

Coordinates: 49°30′02″N 8°09′59″E

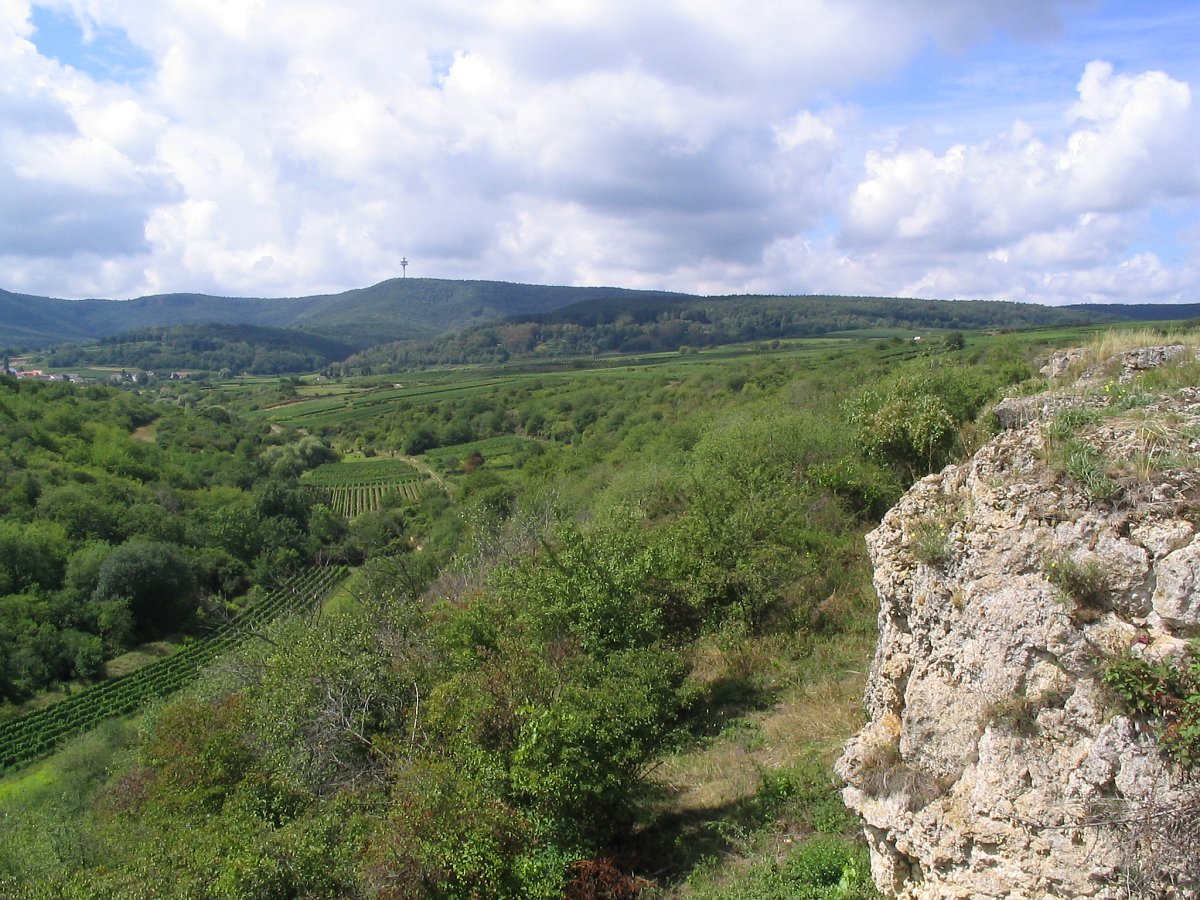
Berntal, view from the hill of Herxheimer Felsenberg

The Felsenberg-Berntal Nature Reserve (German: Naturschutzgebiet Felsenberg-Berntal), is an outlier of the Haardt mountains, which form the eastern ridge of the Palatine Forest region in western Germany. The nature reserve, which extends into the Upper Rhine Plain and has an area of 300 hectares, was established in January 2000 by a statute dated 20 December 1999. The reserve lies in the county of Bad Dürkheim in the German state of Rhineland-Palatinate and comprises the Felsenberg hill and the Berntal valley. The Herxheim Karst Cave on one of its hillsides is known for its archaeological and biological finds.
