= Limburg Abbey =

Ruined abbey in Bad Dürkheim, Germany

Coordinates: 49°27′23″N 8°8′47″E

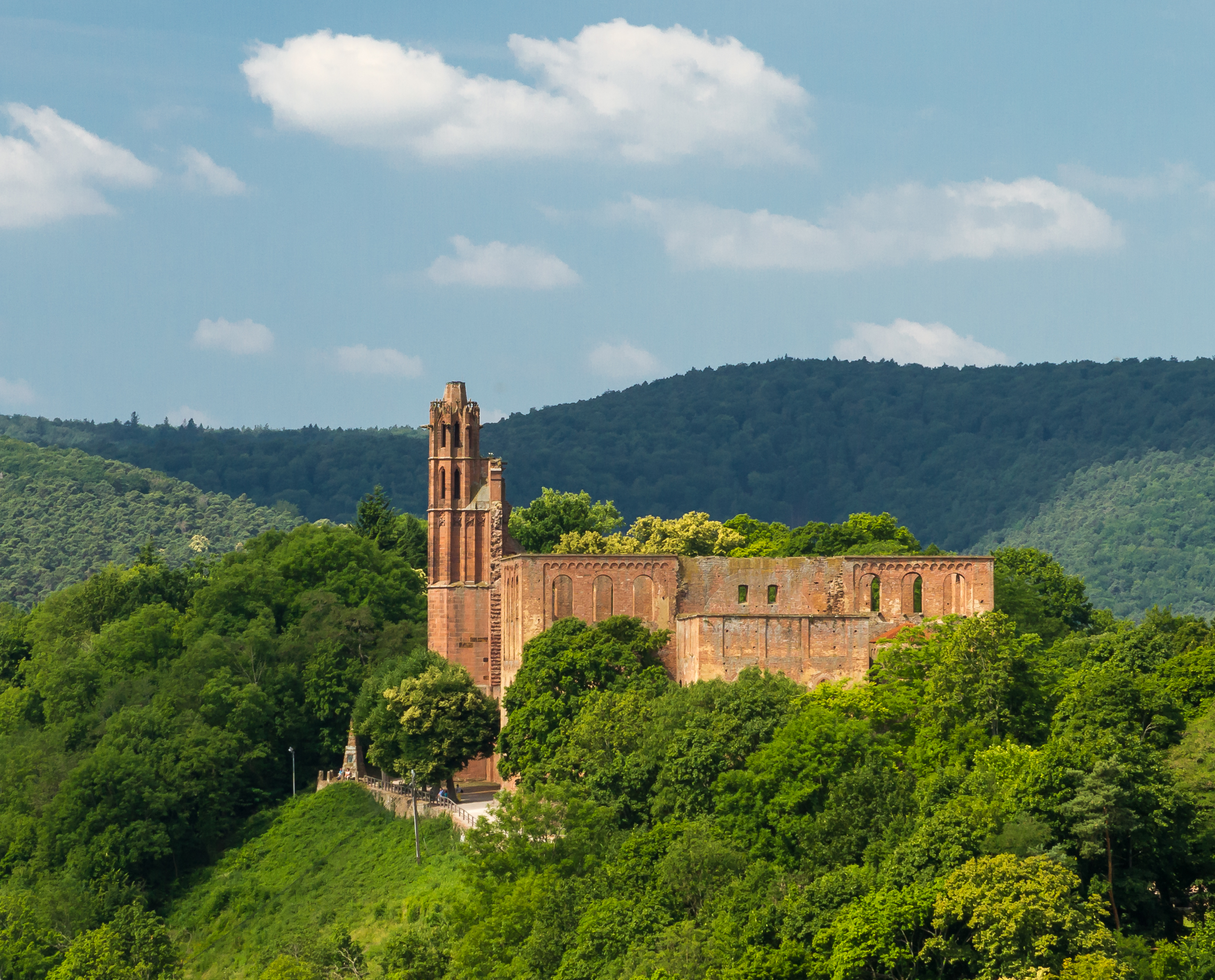
Ruins of Limburg Abbey

Limburg Abbey is a ruined abbey near Bad Dürkheim, at the edge of the Palatinate Forest in Germany. In the 9th century, the Salian Dukes from Worms built a fortress on the Linthberg as their family seat.

== History ==
In 1025, Conrad II, Holy Roman Emperor converted the fortress into a monastery. Between 1034 and 1065, the imperial regalia and other valuables were secured at Limburg. The abbey church was completed under Conrad's son, Henry III, Holy Roman Emperor.

With the rise of the Hohenstaufen, in 1205 the Counts of Leiningen became Vogt (guardian) of the monastery. Based on this, they built Hardenburg Castle on land that belonged to the abbey. Limburg Abbey was repeatedly damaged by the power struggles that ensued in the Rhine region. In 1470, Count Emich VII of Leiningen plundered the abbey, sparing only the library and the sanctuary.

=== Dating Advent ===
Conrad's paternal uncle William began his ecclesiastical career in the royal court where he served as archchaplain to Conrad's wife Gisela of Swabia. In 1028 Conrad appointed William to succeed Bishop Werner as Bishop of Strasbourg.

On November 26, 1038, Conrad stopped by Strasbourg (German: Straßburg) on his return from Burgundy. The Emperor had been expecting to make a ceremonial entrance representing Christ the King entering Jerusalem in glory, only to find the bishop and canons already celebrating Advent. There was at that time no uniform rules for the duration of the season of Advent. However, the Emperor wanted a consistent practice throughout his dominions. A week later, on December 3, Conrad and his wife celebrated the start of Advent at Limburg Abbey. Present were the bishops from Worms, Speyer, Verona, Eichstätt and Hildesheim. Conrad immediately called a synod to resolve the question. The bishops at Limburg determined that Advent should commence on the Sunday between November 27 and December 3. In this they followed a practiced codified by Abbot Berno of Reichenau a decade earlier.

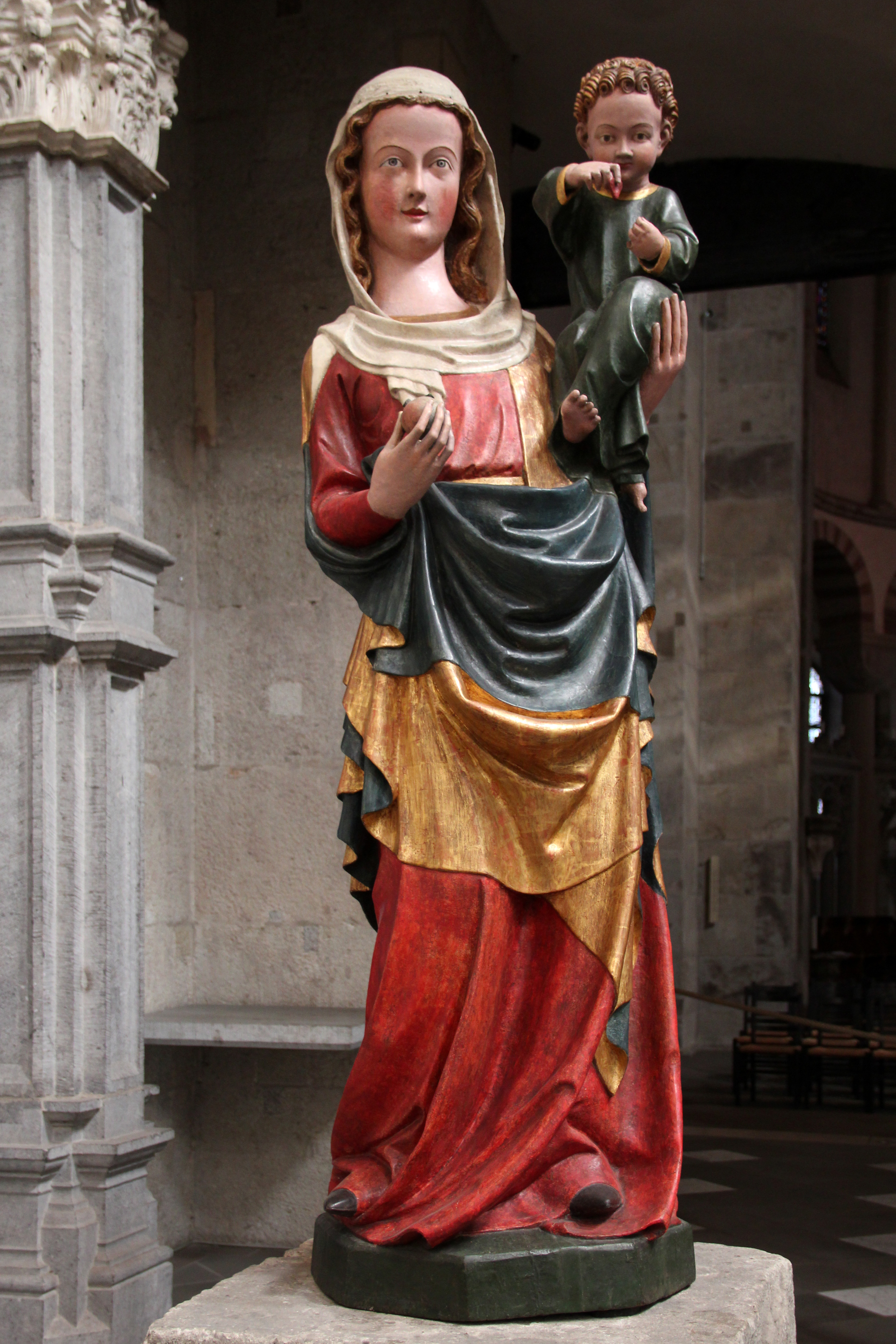
Limburger Madonna, Sankt Maria im Kapitol

== "Limburg Madonna" ==
The statue of the crowned Mother of God, who carries the blessing Christ child on her left arm and holds an apple in her right hand was found in the 1830s in the village of Grethen near the ruins of the Limburg monastery. Stylistically, it is close to Upper Rhine, especially Freiburg and Strasbourg, works from the late 13th century, and is therefore dated to around 1300. Mary's damaged hand has been reconstructed; It is unknown whether she originally held an apple. This is a common iconographic motif. The apple refers to the interpretation of Mary as the 'new Eve'. The crown was probably added soon after 1879 when the statue was purchased for St. Maria im Kapitol in Cologne.

== Burials ==
- Gunhilda of Denmark
