= Modenbach =

River in Germany

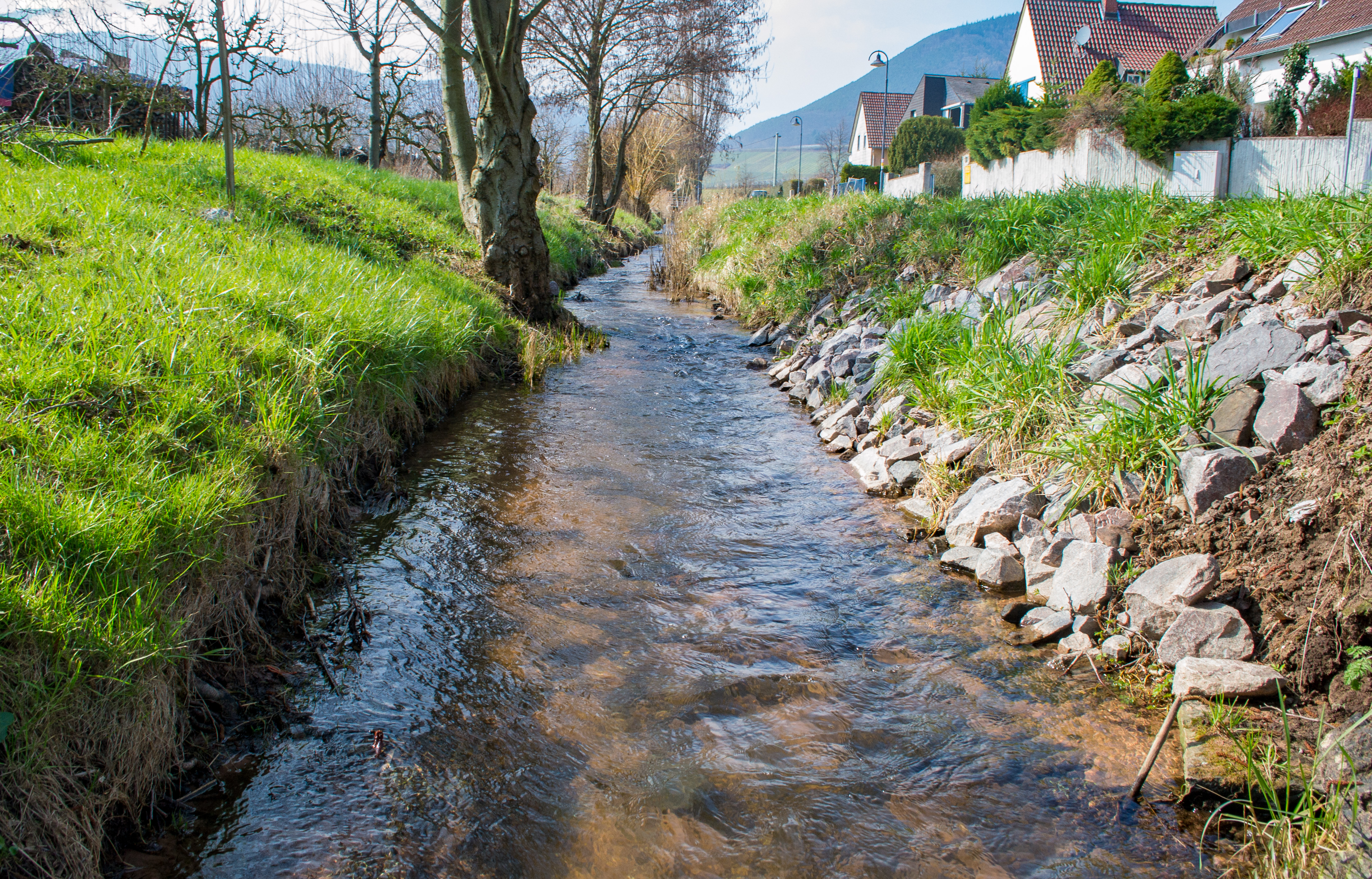
- The Buschmühle mill in the Modenbach valley

Location
- Country: Germany
- State: Rhineland-Palatinate
- Regions: Palatine Forest and Anterior Palatinate
- Reference no.: DE: 23788

Physical characteristics
- Source
  - location: North of Ramberg on the eastern flank of the Hermeskopf
  - coordinates: 49°17′29″N 8°00′37″E
  - elevation: ca. 438 m above sea level (NN)
- Mouth
  - location: In Hanhofen into the Speyerbach
  - coordinates: 49°18′28″N 8°21′06″E
  - elevation: ca. 107 m above sea level (NN)
- Length: 29.83 km (18.54 mi)
- Basin size: 84.132 km^{2} (32.484 sq mi)

Basin features
- Progression: Speyerbach→ Rhine→ North Sea
- Landmarks: Villages: Flemlingen (only Buschmühle), Hainfeld, Edesheim, Großfischlingen, Freimersheim, Freisbach, Hanhofen
- Tributaries
  - right: Bruchbach
- Waterbodies: Reservoirs: Weir by the Buschmühle mill, Edesheim Castle pond

The Modenbach is a stream, just under 30 kilometres (19 mi) long, and a right-hand tributary of the Speyerbach in the German state of Rhineland-Palatinate.

== Course ==
The Modenbach rises in the Palatine Forest east of the Palatine Watershed at a height of about 460 m. Its source lies a kilometre south of the forester's lodge, Forsthaus Heldenstein, on a saddle between the Steigerkopf (613.6 m) to the east and the Pfaffenkopf (566.0 m) to the west.

Initially heading in a southeasterly direction, but subsequently turning eastwards, the Modenbach flows through the valley named after it towards the gently rolling vineyard country by the German Wine Route. It reaches them above the village of Hainfeld, after having broken through the rim of the low mountain range between the Teufelsberg (right; 597.6 m) and the Blättersberg (left; 613.2 m). Below Hainfeld it turns northeast and, passing Edesheim, the stream leaves the hill country and flows through the western part of the Upper Rhine Plain. Three kilometres below Freisbach it is joined from the right by its largest tributary, the Bruchbach.

After another 5½ kilometres the Modenbach discharges from the right into the Speyerbach on the southeastern edge of the municipality of Hanhofen.

== Transport ==
In Edesheim the Modenbach is crossed by the B 38 federal highway and the Palatine Maximilian Railway, both of which run from Landau to Neustadt. One kilometre to the east the A 65 motorway, from Karlsruhe to Ludwigshafen, crosses the stream. On Sundays, the no. 506 railway service runs through the valley, starting at Edenkoben station.

== Sights and culture ==
=== Structures ===
Sights in the area of the upper Modenback include the ruins of Meistersel Castle on the right bank, and the mill of Buschmühle near the village of Weyher. The mill was first mentioned in 1603 and worked until 1958. The classicist main building of the Buschmühle, converted in 1838 into the style of a manor house, has been used as a restaurant since 1900 and is also used as a training centre for gastronomy today.

In Edesheim is the Church of St. Peter and St. Paul, the little, late baroque castle Schloss Kupperwolf, and the castle Schloss Edesheim, built in medieval times but later converted into a water castle for the prince-bishops of Speyer. Today it hosts the Edesheim Castle Festival (Edesheimer Schlossfestspiele), which includes open-air performances on the lake stage by the castle pond, fed by the Modebach.

=== Viewing points ===
The edge of the mountain range north of Hainfeld offers viewing points from a height of 600 metres above sea level over the Rhine Plain below. These include the Ludwig Tower on the Blättersberg or the Rietburg, which is served by a chairlift. Below the Rietburg the little schloss of Villa Ludwigshöhe was built in the 19th century for the King of Bavaria. Roman Catholic processions take place from Burrweiler to the chapel of St. Anne on the southeastern slopes of the Teufelsberg.

== See also ==
- List of rivers of Rhineland-Palatinate
