= Rietburg Chairlift =

Chair lift in Rhineland-Palatinate, Germany

Coordinates: 49°16′40.4″N 8°05′10.8″E

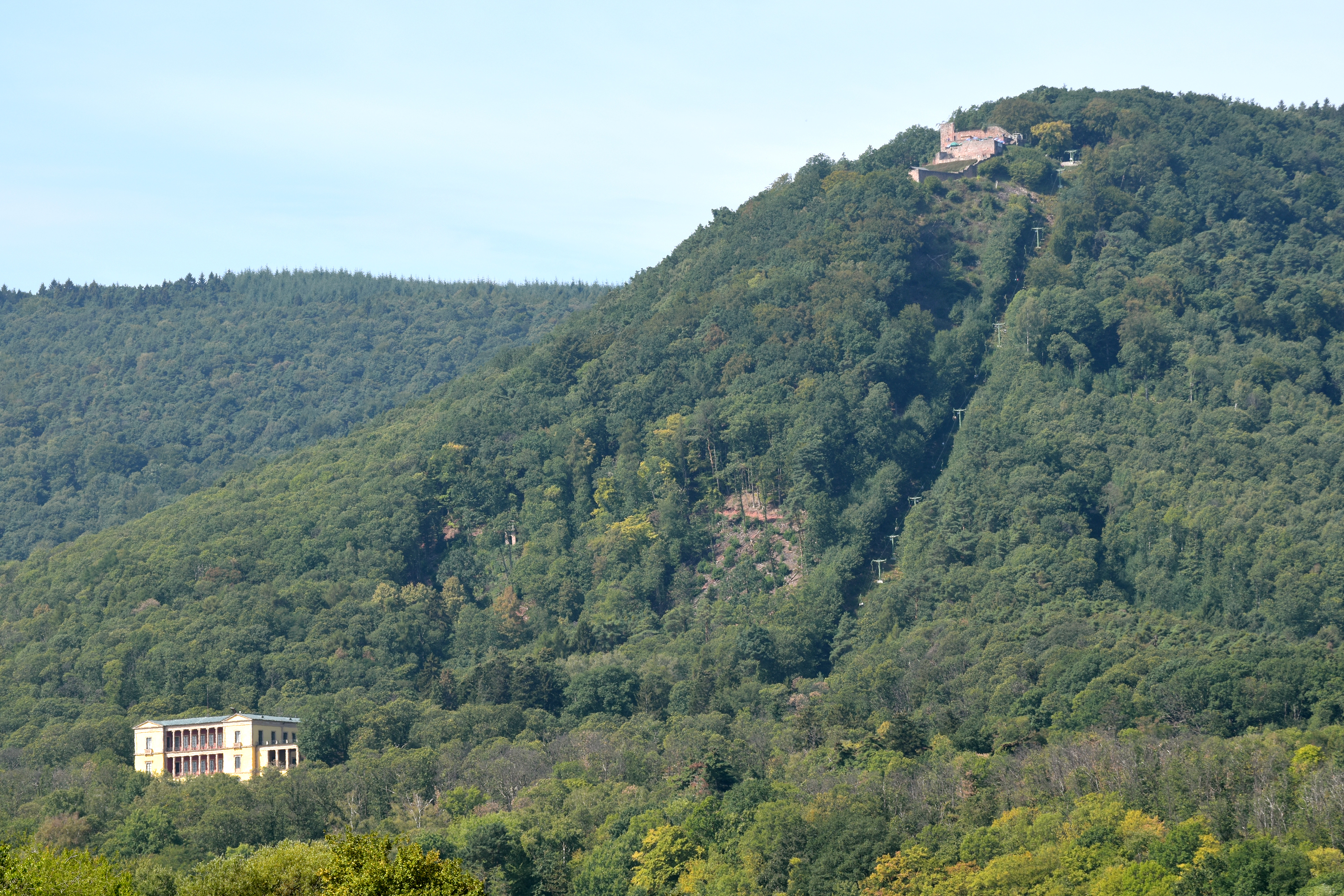
The Rietburg with the swathe cut by the chairlift

The Rietburg chairlift (German: Rietburgbahn) is a chair lift that runs from the village of Rhodt in the Palatinate region of Germany to the ruins of the medieval castle of Rietburg. The chairlift is the county of Südliche Weinstraße in the state of Rhineland-Palatinate.

== Geography ==
The top station of the Rietburg lift is located a few metres north of the Rietburg. The castle itself stands at an elevation of 535 metres (1,755 ft) on the northeastern flank of the 618-metre (2,028 ft)-high Blättersberg in the Haardt mountain range that forms the eastern rim of the Palatine Forest highlands. Built into the castle ruins is a pub, the Höhengaststätte Rietburg; in the vicinity is a deer enclosure, in which fallow deer are the largest species kept. The bottom station, at about 300 metres (980 ft) above sea level, is near Villa Ludwigshöhe and is accessible by foot or by car. The route to the chairlift from the major nearby transport routes, the A 65 motorway and B 38 federal road, runs through the little town of Edenkoben.

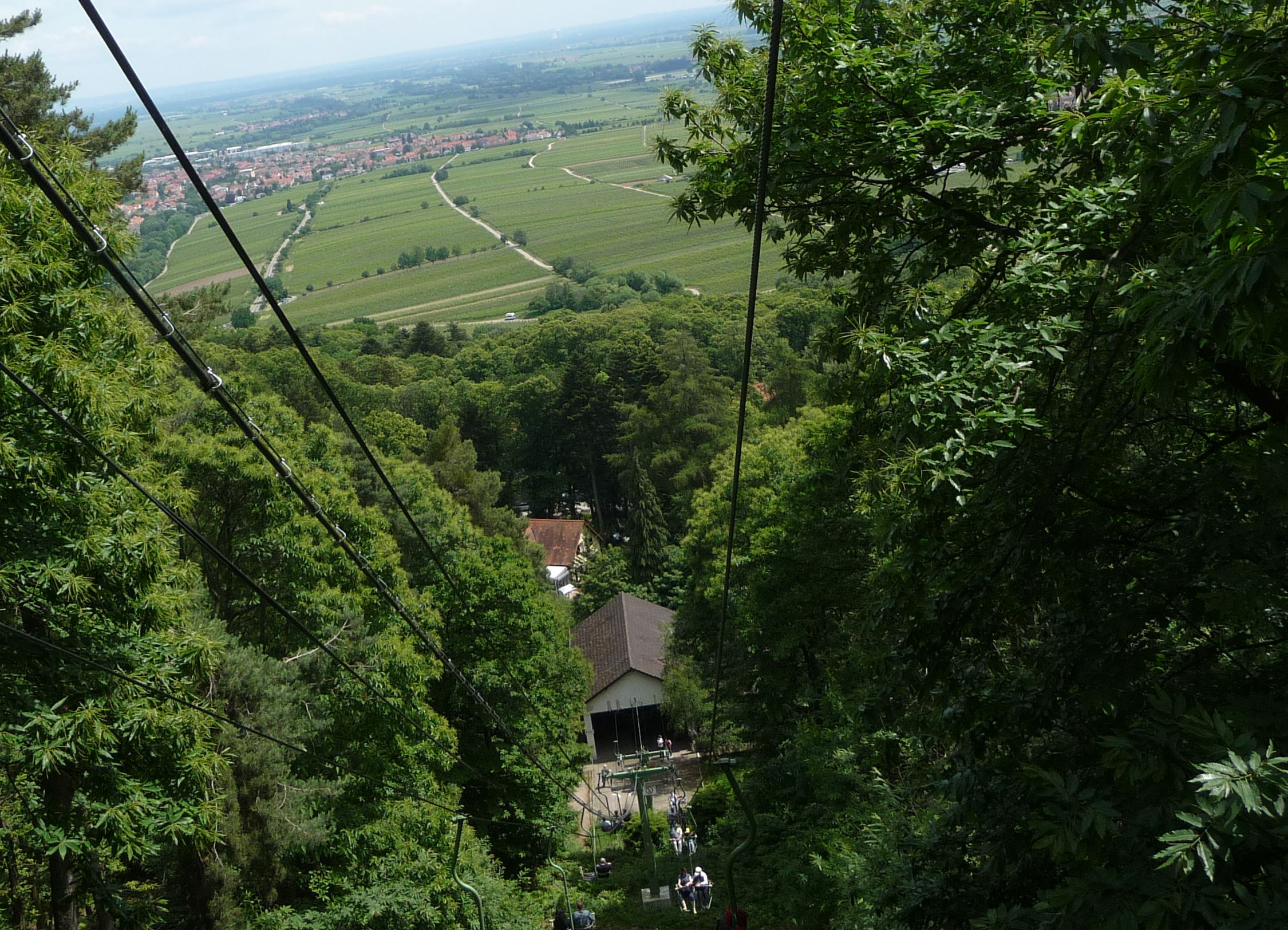
View from the Rietburg lift
