= Blättersberg =

Mountain in Rhineland-Palatinate, Germany

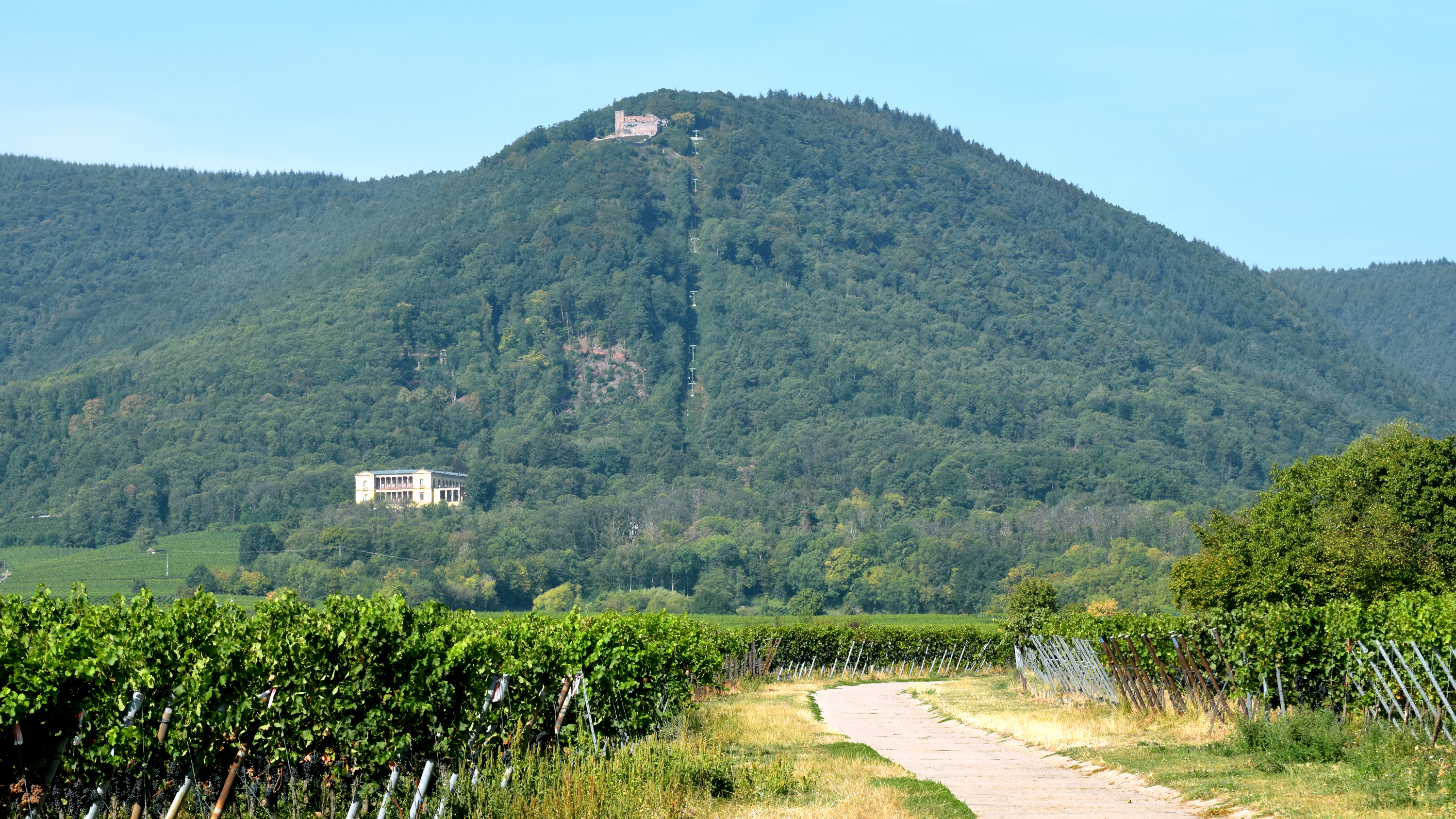
- View of the Blättersberg from Edenkoben

Highest point
- Elevation: 613.2 m above sea level (NHN) (2,012 ft)
- Coordinates: 49°16′32″N 8°03′54″E

Geography
- Location within Rhineland-Palatinate
- Location: near Rhodt unter Rietburg; Südliche Weinstraße, Rhineland-Palatinate (Germany) (Ludwig observation tower)
- Parent range: Haardt, Palatine Forest

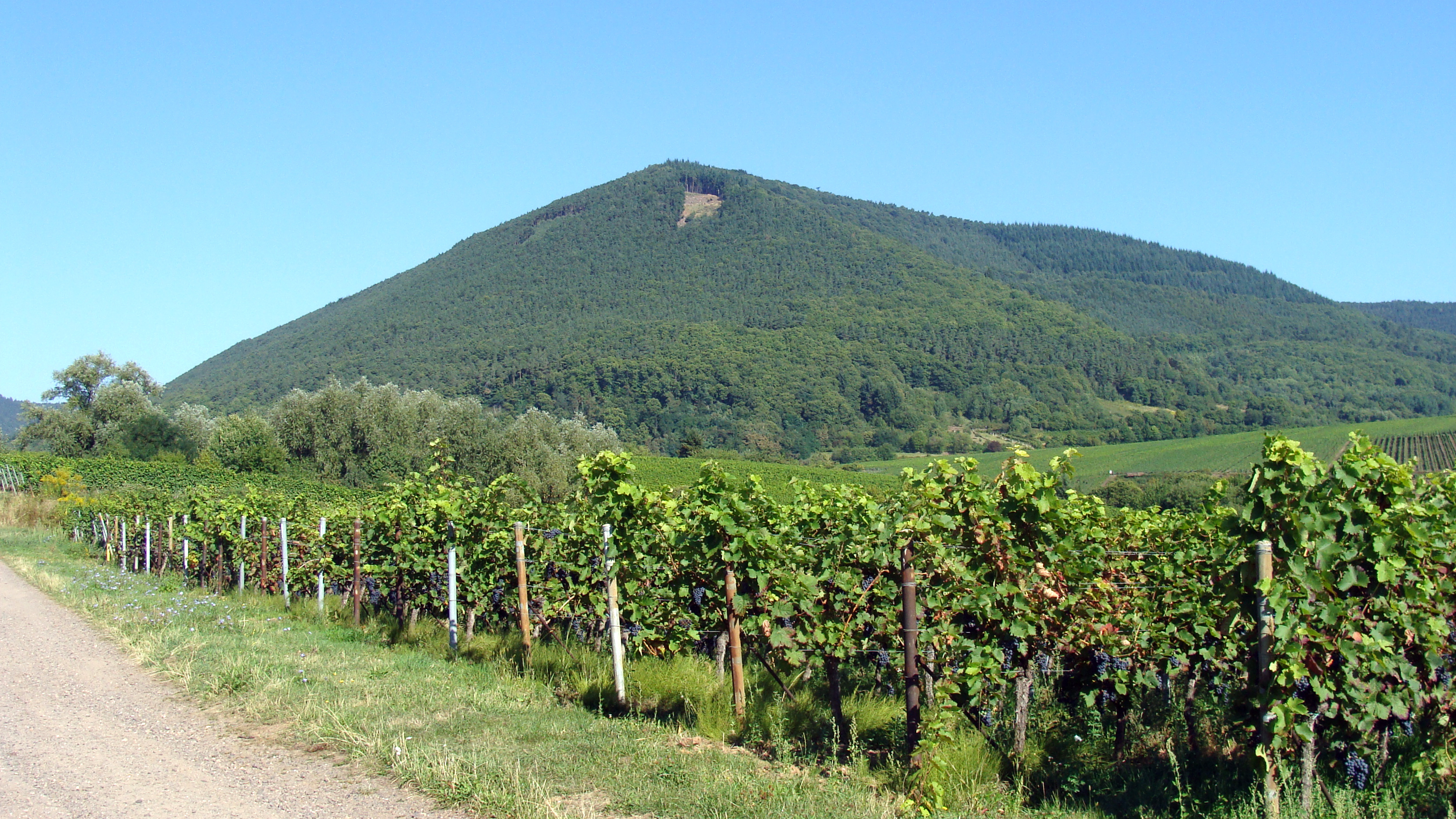
View of the Blättersberg from Burrweiler

The Blättersberg near Rhodt unter Rietburg in the Rhenish-Palatine county of Südliche Weinstraße is a mountain, 613.2 m above sea level (NHN), in the Palatine Forest in the German state of Rhineland-Palatinate.

The mountain has a north summit (613.2 m) and a south summit (606.0 m); on the latter is the Ludwig observation tower.

== Geography ==
=== Location ===
The Blättersberg lies in the Haardt, the eastern mountain chain of the Palatine Forest, in the eponymous nature park. Its summit rises 3 kilometres west-northwest of Rhodt unter Rietburg, within whose territory most of the mountain lies, 4.5 km west-southwest of Edenkoben, between the Edenkoben valley in the north and the Modenbach valley in the south, and 1.6 km (all as the crow flies) northwest of the village of Weyher in der Pfalz. The mountain can be clearly made out from the Rhine Plain. On its east-northeastern flank, to the west and above the stately home of Villa Ludwigshöhe that is visible for miles, is the castle of Rietburg (Rhodt), which is also a landmark. At the southern foot of the mountain, by the upper reaches of the Modenbach stream, lies the historic estate of the Buschmühle mill.

=== Elevation ===
The elevation of the Blättersberg is given on some topographic maps as 613.2 m, but on others as 618 m. About 60 metres south-southeast of the summit is another high point, 611.8 m.

== Ludwig Tower ==
On the southern summit of the Blätterberg stands an observation tower, built in 1883, called the Ludwig Tower (Ludwigsturm). From the viewing platform of the 15 metre-high tower the view to the east into the Rhine Plain is blocked by the trees, but elsewhere one can see as far as the Badener Höhe and Hornisgrinde in the Black Forest to the south-southeast, nearby Trifels Castle to the southwest, the Frankenweide forest with its hills, the Weißenberg (Luitpold Tower) and Hortenkopf (transmission mast) to the west, the nearby Kesselberg mountain to the northwest and the highest point in the Palatine Forest, the Kalmit, to the north-northeast.

== Transport links ==
The Blättersberg and the Ludwig Tower may be reached from the top station of the chair lift near Villa Ludwigshöhe (530.8 m) or from the Hüttenbrunnen hiker's car park in the Edenkobener valley above the Kohlplatz. Numerous hiking trails run through the local countryside.

== Gallery ==
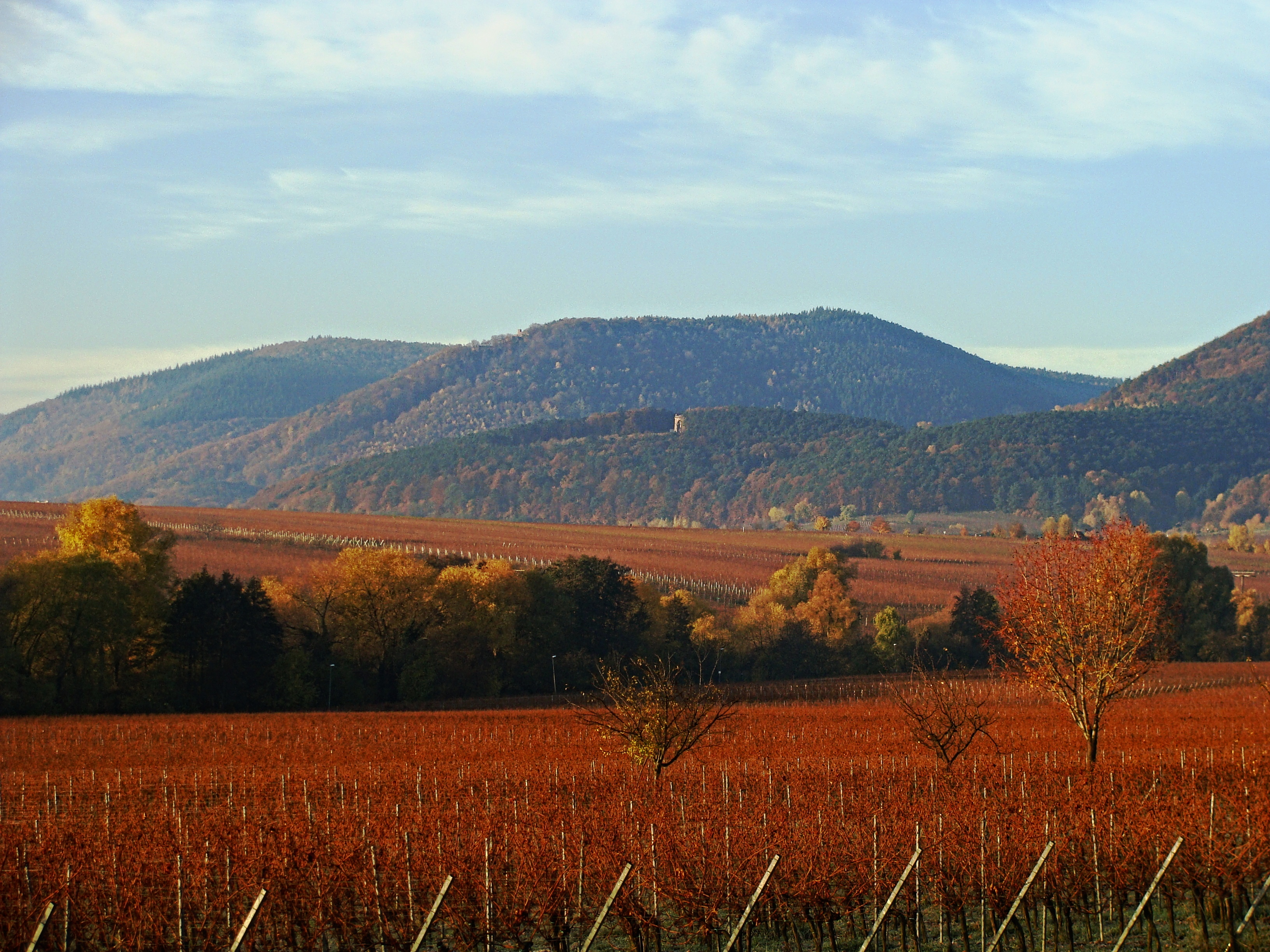
View from Maikammer

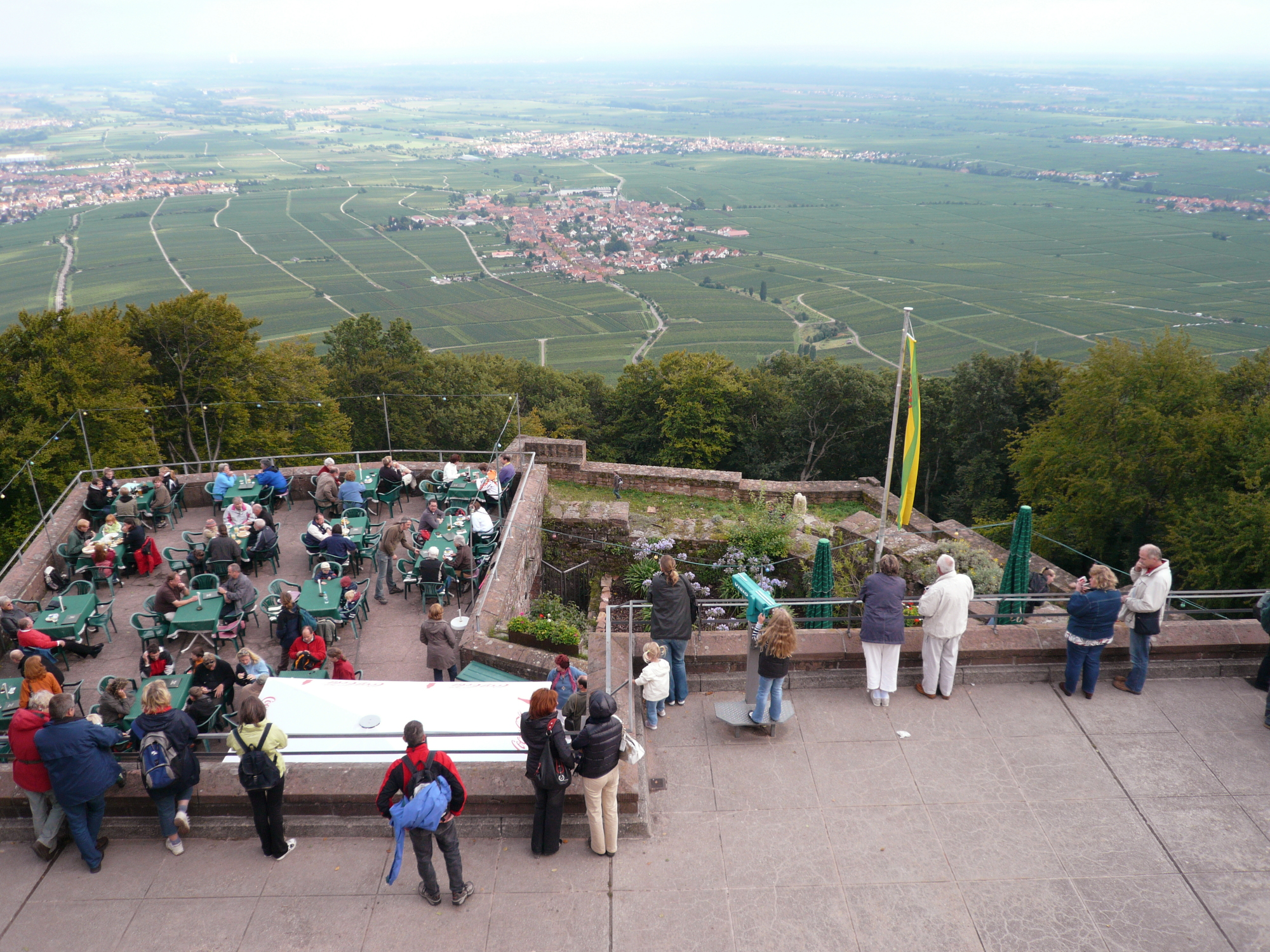
On the Rietburg

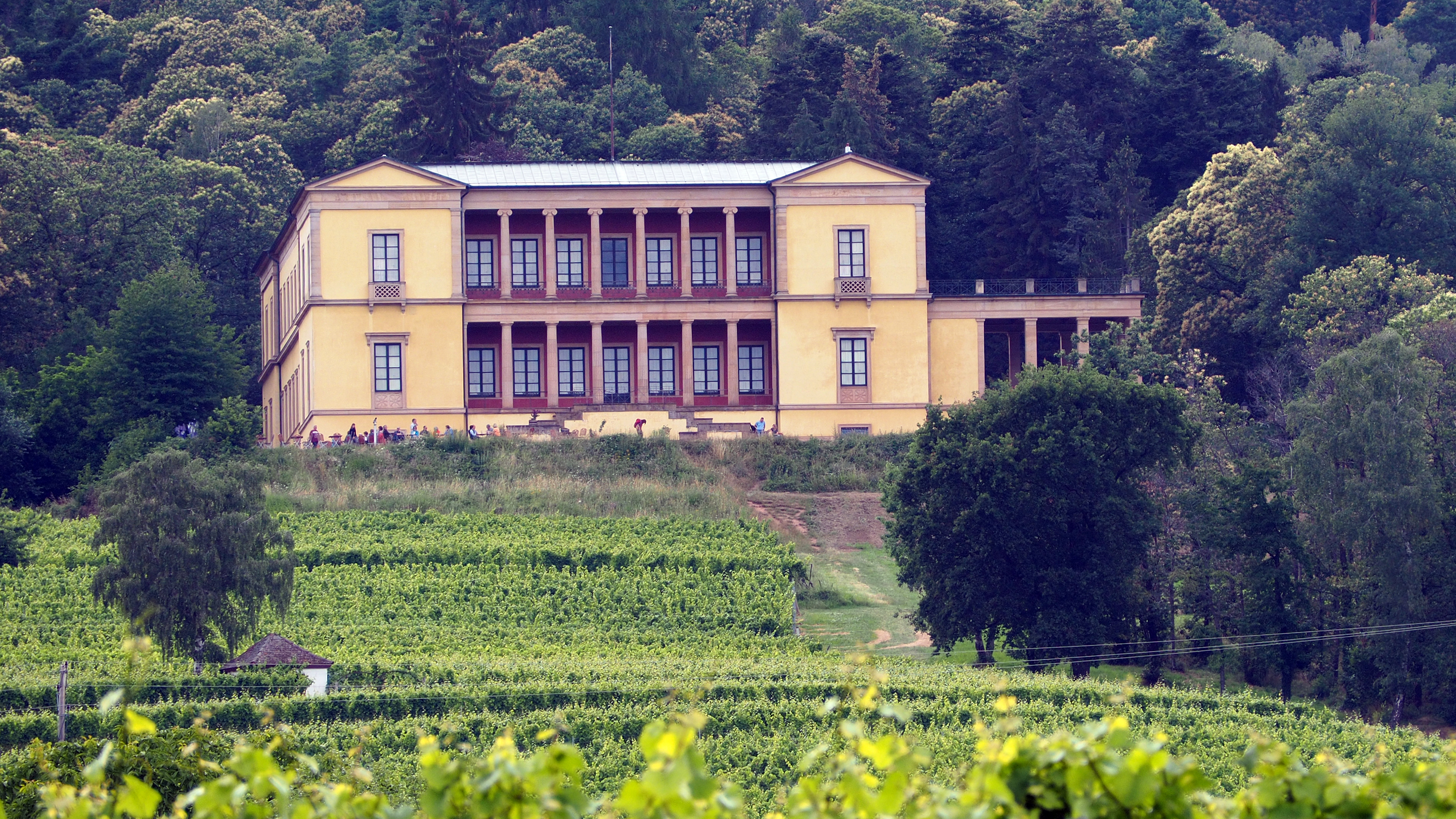
Villa Ludwigshöhe

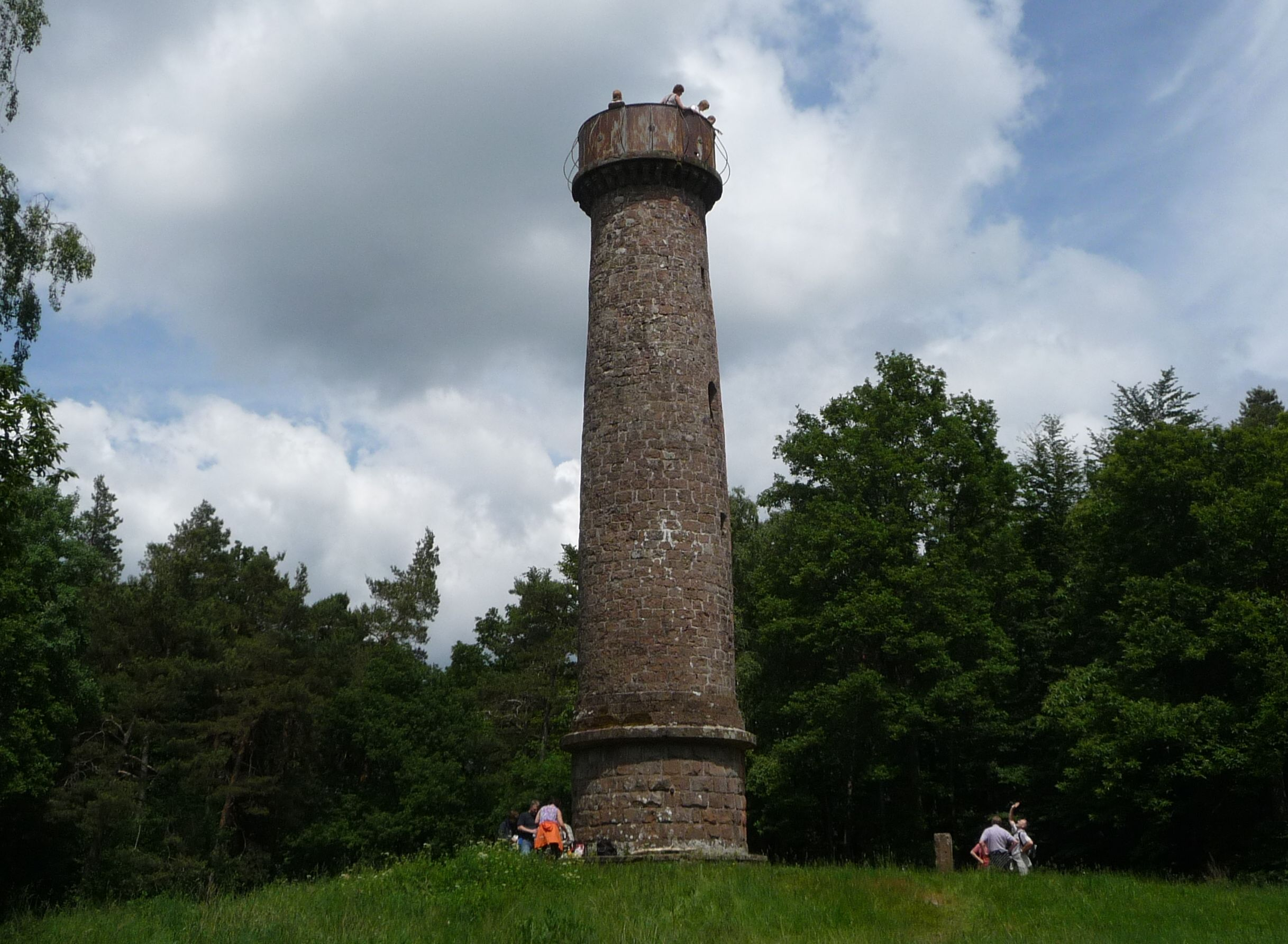
Ludwig Tower
