= Kesselberg (Haardt) =

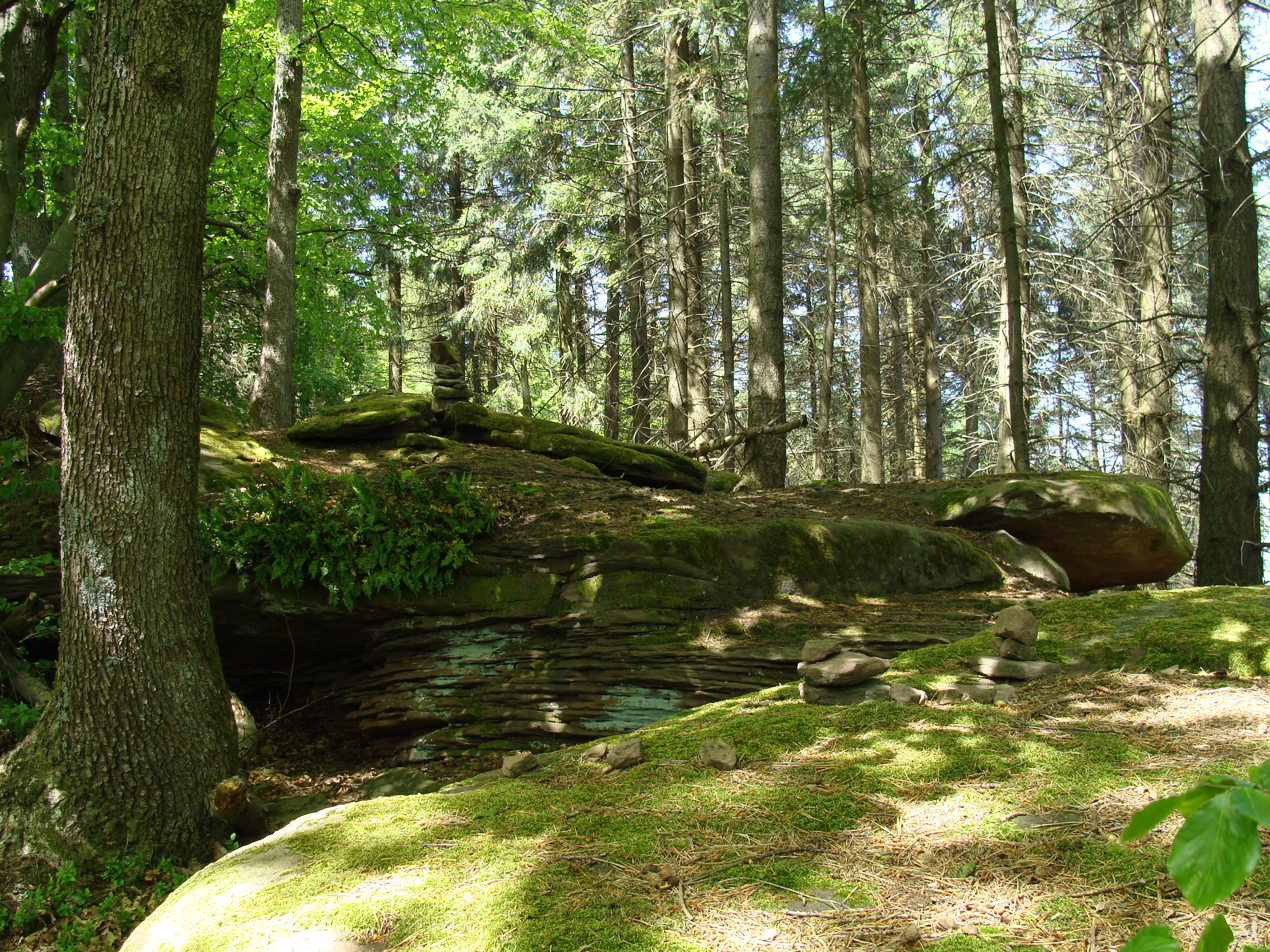
- Summit area of the Kesselberg

Highest point
- Elevation: 661.8 m above sea level (NHN) (2,171 ft)
- Coordinates: 49°17′04″N 8°02′42″E

Geography
- Location within Rhineland-Palatinate
- Location: near Edenkoben; Südliche Weinstraße, Rhineland-Palatinate (Germany)
- Parent range: Haardt (Palatine Forest)

Geology
- Mountain type: Bunter sandstone

The Kesselberg near Edenkoben in the German state of Rhineland-Palatinate (Südliche Weinstraße county) is a mountain, 661.8 m above sea level (NHN), It is second highest peak in the Palatine Forest region after the Kalmit (672.6 m) and also the third highest mountain in the Palatinate region (highest: Donnersberg 686.5 m).

== Location ==
The Kesselberg is located, like the Kalmit, in the mountain range of Haardt between the Edenkobener valley in the north and the Modenbach valley in the south. From the Rhine Plain the mountain is hidden behind the Blättersberg (618 m). Views over the surrounding regions in the Palatine Forest are blocked by the trees that cover the summit.

== Gletschermulden ==
On the summit plateau are various rocks, named on hiking maps as the Gletschermulden, with striking round depressions in the Bunter sandstone of which they are composed. In addition to an unprovable theory that they were originally Celtic sacrifice bowls, there is also a theory that they are glacial potholes or mills. However, they would require a thick ice sheet to have covered the region and there is no evidence, such as glacial stria, anywhere in the Palatine region. It is thus questionable whether this could have been a periglacial site in the last ice age, as has been posited. A new interpretation suggests the depressions were simply formed by weathering processes in the various layers of sandstone.

The old signpost on the Kesselberg has been replaced by a new one. It discusses the formation of the depressions in both an amusing, but also a scientific, way.

== Access ==
The summit may be climbed from the trail forks at Benderplatz and Kohlplatz. From the main trail that links both junctions, a smaller footpath branches off, leading to the summit. This footpath was blazed in 1953 by the historian, Friedrich Sprater, and named after him. The Benderplatz may be reached from the Lolosruhe car park and the Forsthaus Heldenstein (a former forester's lodge), the Kohlplatz from the Modenbach valley and the Edenkobener valley near the Edenkobener Hut.

== Gallery ==
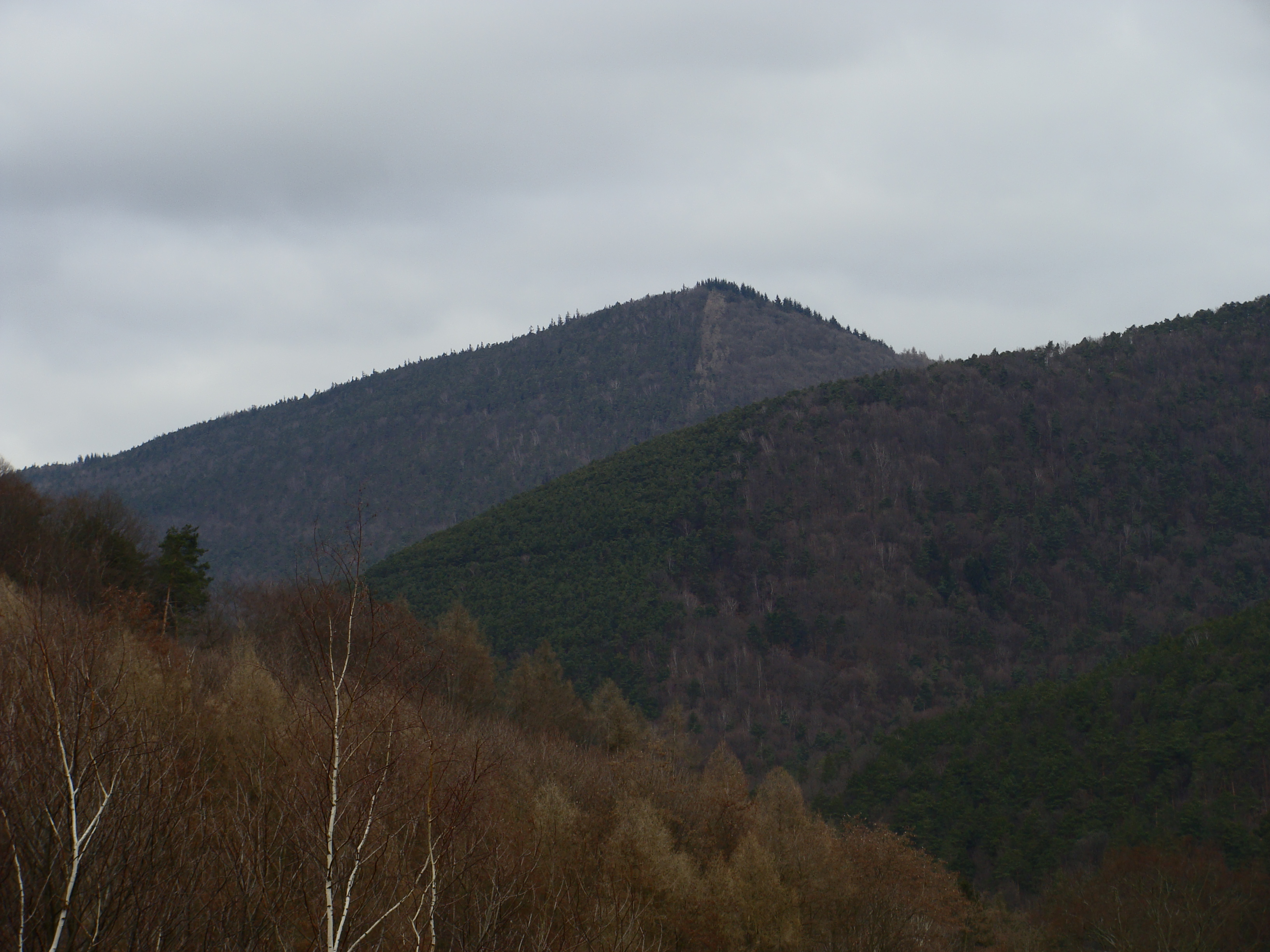
The Kesselberg seen from the Modenbach valley

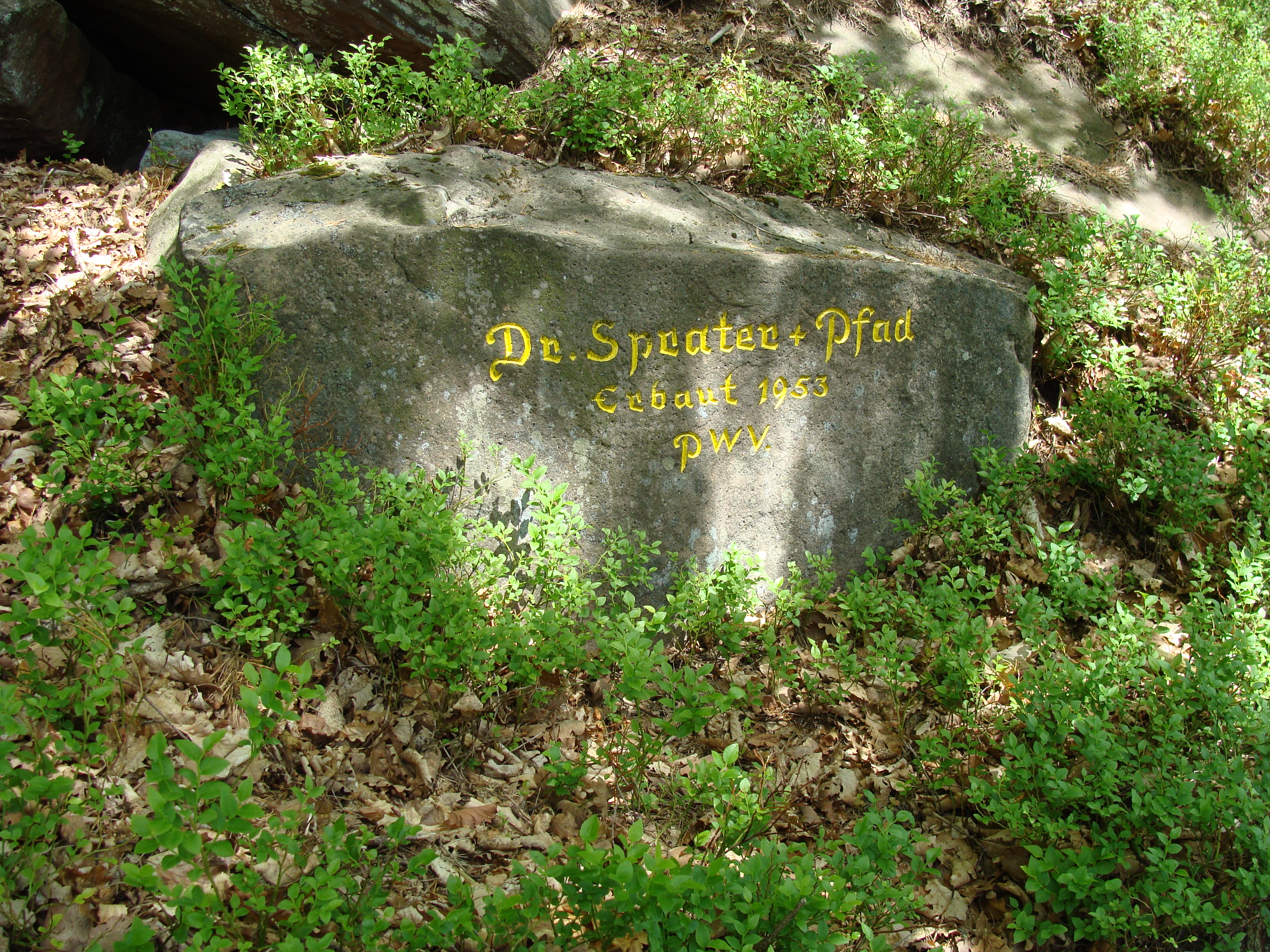
Ritterstein No. 185 on the Dr. Sprater Footpath

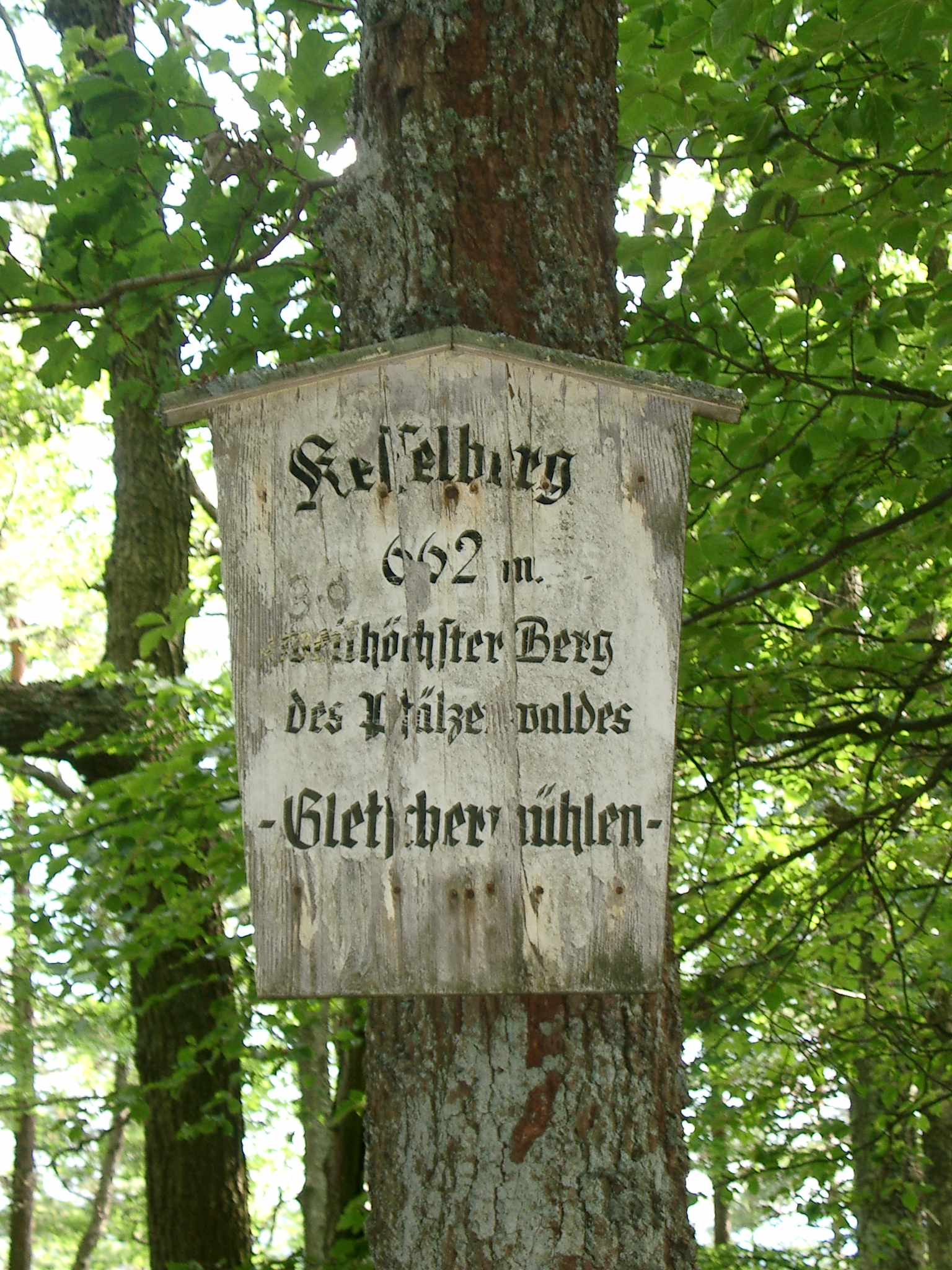
Old signpost on the Kesselberg (July 2005)

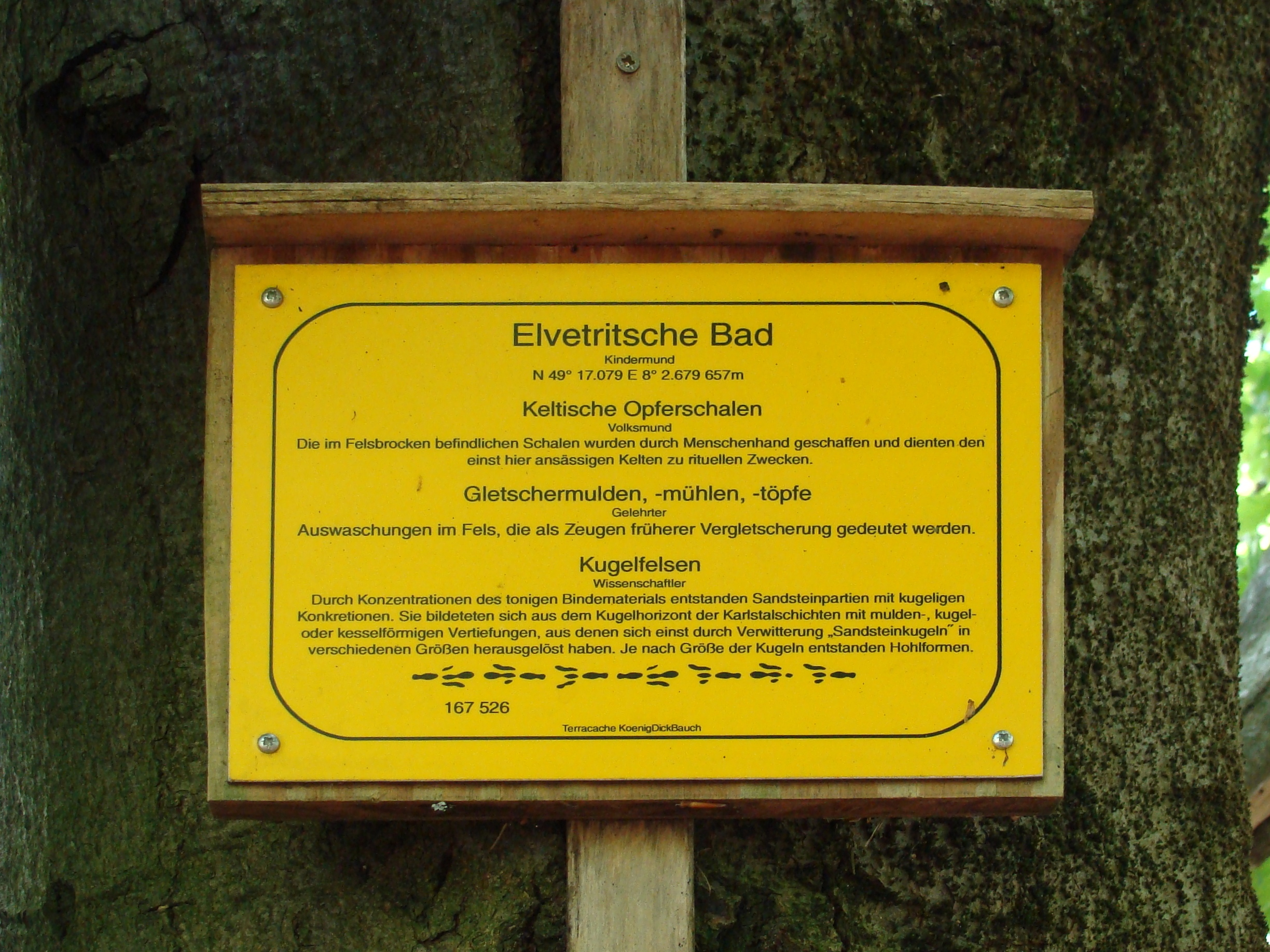
New signpost on the Kesselberg (May 2012)

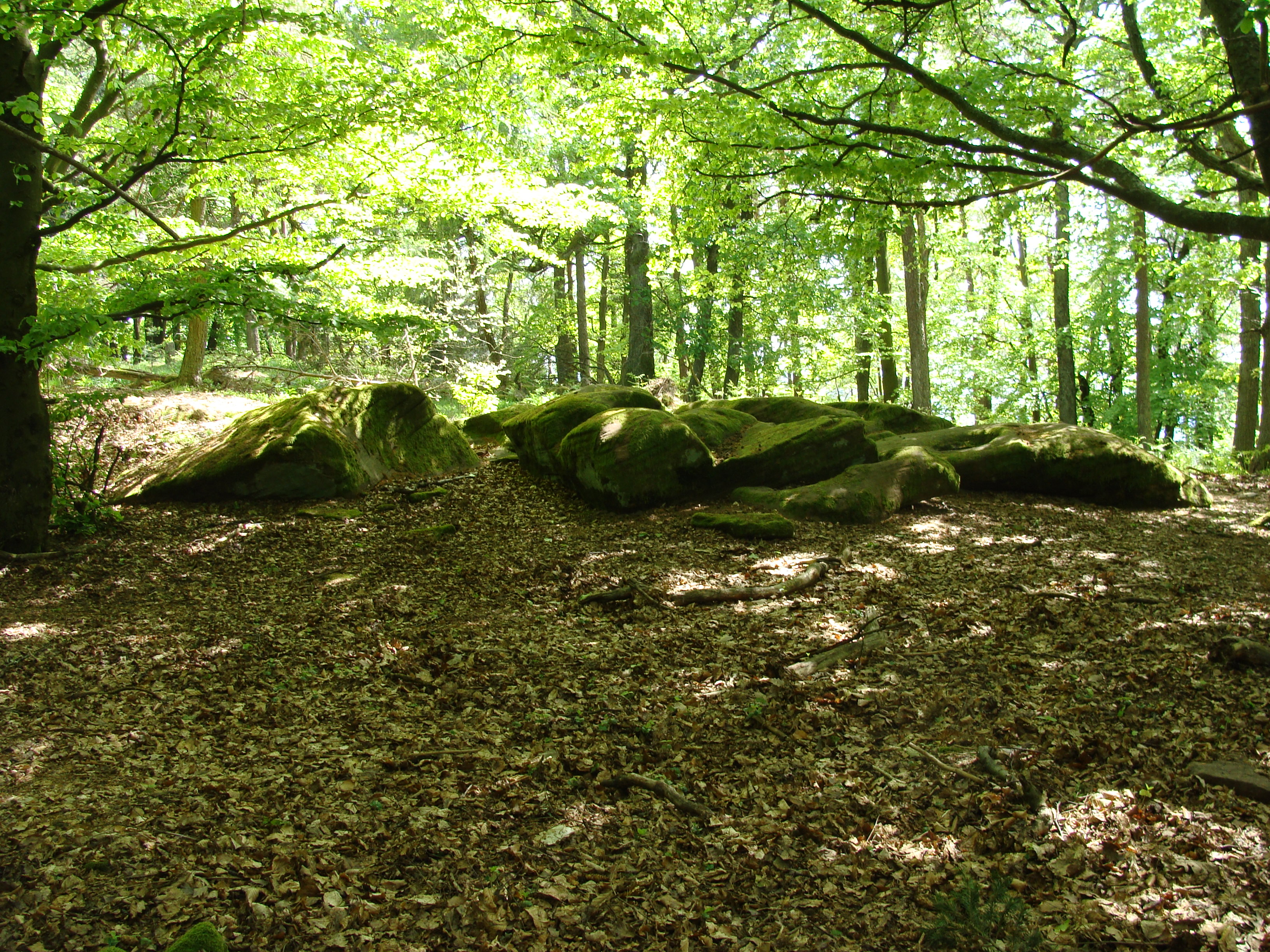
The Gletschermulden, full view

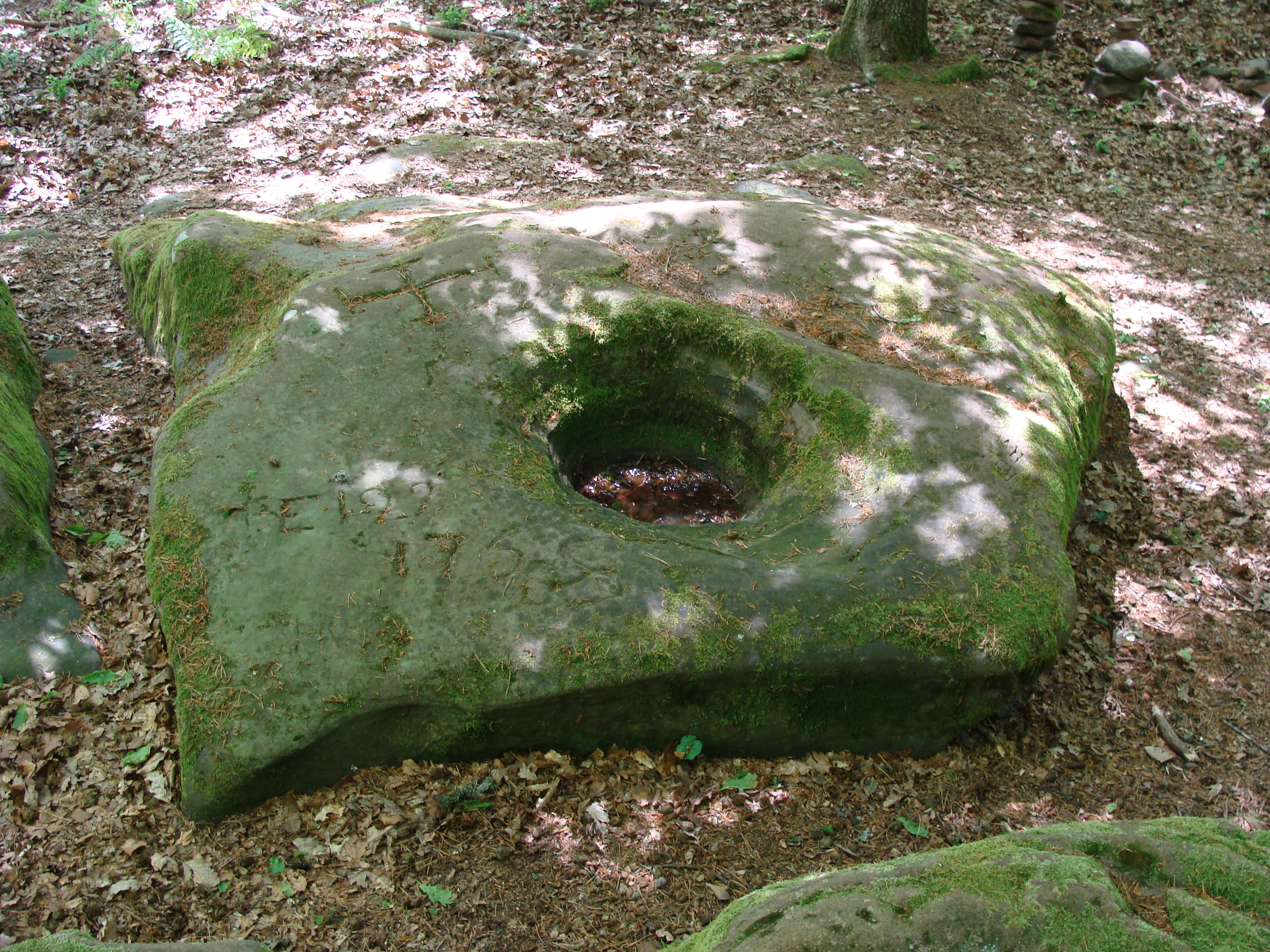
The Gletschermulden, part view
