= Anna von Szent-Ivanyi =

German-Hungarian noblewoman (1797–1889)

Anna von Szent-Ivanyi (19 January 1797 – 28 January 1889) was a German-Hungarian noblewoman who became the owner of a successful winery in Deidesheim. She never married, and in her later years became an important benefactress of the town's hospital-asylum ("Deidesheimer Spital") and of the Latin school with which it shared its site.

== Life ==
In 1797 Anna "Nanette" von Szent-Ivanyi was born in Freinsheim, a small town, already under French military occupation, south of Bad Dürkheim, which became part of the French First Republic the next year. Johann von Szent-Iványi, her father, was an aristocratic army officer of Hungarian provenance, serving in the Imperial Army: his presence in the Rhineland was a result of the French revolutionary wars. He was promoted to the rank of Major general in 1802. His wife, born Maria Anna Tillmann, who was Anna's mother, had been a widow when she had married Johann von Szent-Iványi. Maria Anna's first husband, Franz Joseph Stengel, who had died in 1794, had held a senior administrative post as a "Stiftsschaffner" of the Electoral Palatinate, based in Frankenthal. Anna von Szent-Ivanyi was therefore born the step half-sister of Josephine Stengel (1789–1834) on account of her mother's first marriage. The relationship was an important one because after she grew up Josephine Stengel married Andreas Jordan (1775–1848), the town's mayor, who later became a member of the lower chamber of the Bavarian National assembly ("Bayerische Ständeversammlung") after the region was handed over to Bavaria in 1816. All this meant, put simply, that Anna von Szent-Ivanyi was well connected from the moment of her birth, and the value of her family connections increased further through the on-going success of her step half brother-in-law, the businessman-politician Andreas Jordan.

Anna von Szent-Ivanyi moved in 1824 to be near her relatives in Deidesheim, then as now regarded an exceptional location for winegrowing due to the favourable effect on the climate of shelter from nearby hills to the west and the moderating impact on temperature extremes from the River Rhine to the west. He (step half-) brother in law now bought for her twenty morgens of the town's best vineyards, which made her one of the most important wine producers in the district, and a wealthy member of the local business community. Her disposable wealth was significantly increased by a major auction she arranged which took place on 22 April 1858 of wine that had been produced, accumulated stored at her winery.

On 17 March 1879 she created a large endowment in favour of the hospital-asylum ("Deidesheimer Spital") which was evolving and expanding to serve the community not simply as a basic hospital, but also as an asylum, a retirement home, overnight hostel and, in time of war, military hospital and convalescence institution. The endowment also covered poor relief for disadvantaged member of the community and, between 1874 and 1893, a Latin school.

Both on account of the growth of the wine business in western Europe through the middle decades of the nineteenth century and because of the fecundity of her relatives, by the time of her death, aged 92, in 1889 Nanette von Szent-Ivanyi was a well-networked member of a leading family in the Deidesheim region. Among her more noteworthy kinsfolk were the statesman Heinrich von Gagern(1799–1880), the high-profile Catholic convert and priest, Ernst von Gagern and the economist-politician Philipp Tillmann in nearby Edesheim.
