= Hillside castle =

Castle built on the side of a hill

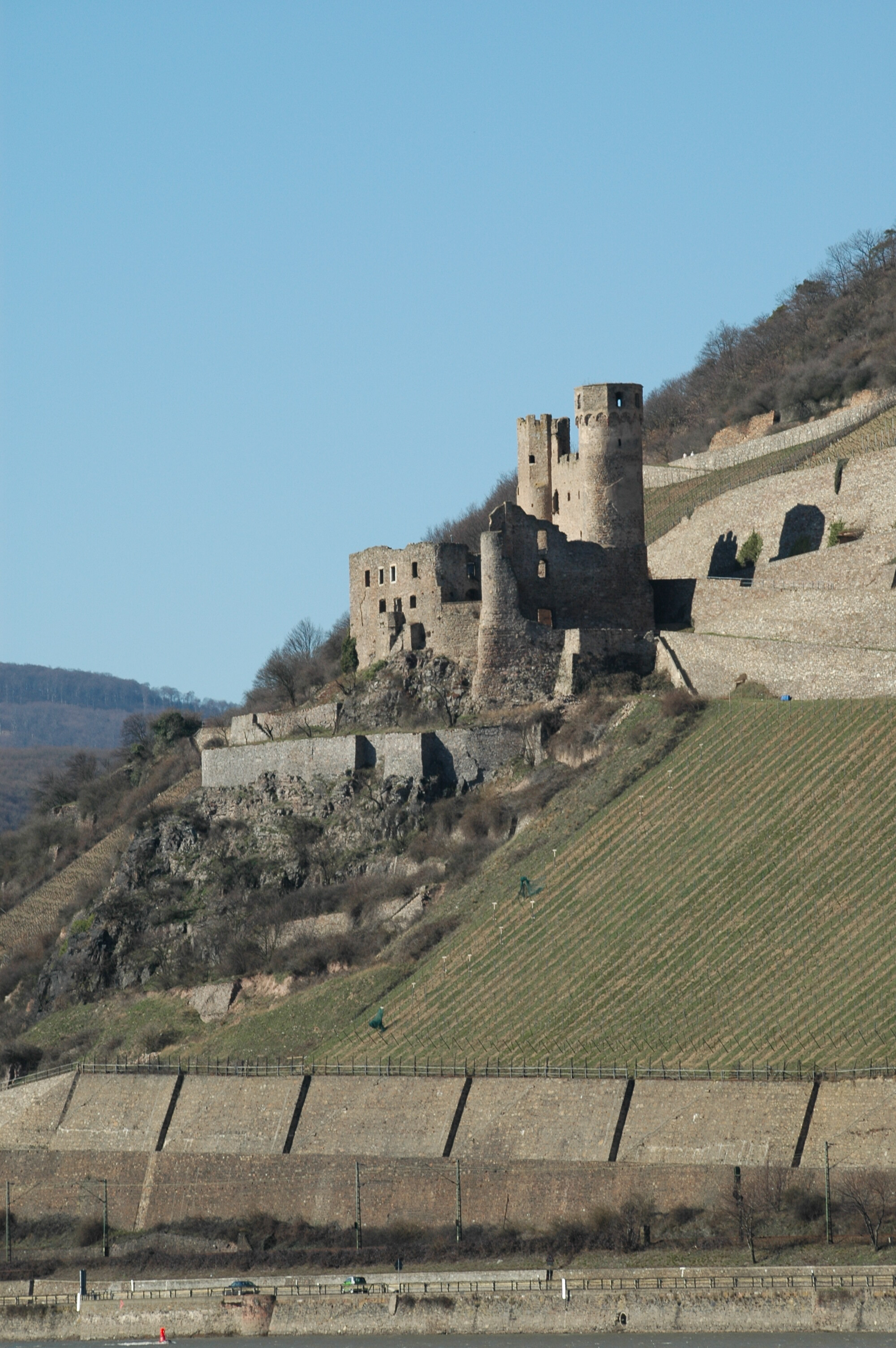
Ehrenfels Castle on the Rhine

A hillside castle is a castle built on the side of a hill above much of the surrounding terrain but below the summit itself. It is thus a type of hill castle and emerged in Europe in the second half of the 11th century. As a result of the particular danger to the site from attacks on the castle from the rising ground above it, this weak point is usually strongly protected by a shield wall or a Bergfried. Often a combination of these two passive defensive works were used.

The advantage of a hillside castle was that its well was much less deep than that of a hilltop castle. The boring of the well was often the most expensive and time-consuming element in the overall construction of a castle. Often, however, its water supply was ensured with the additional help of donkeys as pack animals, entailing the construction of special donkey tracks.

There are numerous hillside castles in the German Central Uplands, especially in stream and river valleys, for example on the Middle Rhine. They were often built as customs posts (Zollburgen) and lay close to trading routes. In all they make up less than 1% of all medieval castles as categorised by topographic location, because they had enormous strategic disadvantages as a result of being dominated by higher ground on the uphill side.

Whereas hilltop castles tend to have good inter-visibility with other castle sites, the restricted view of hillside castles such as Ewloe Castle means they were used to monitor movement along particular transport routes.

Examples of hillside castles include Katz Castle in Sankt Goarshausen, Ehrenfels Castle in Rüdesheim and the Rietburg near Rhodt in the Palatinate.

== See also ==
- Spur castle

== Sources ==
- Horst Wolfgang Böhme, Reinhard Friedrich, Barbara Schock-Werner (ed.): Wörterbuch der Burgen, Schlösser und Festungen. Philipp Reclam, Stuttgart 2004, ISBN 3-15-010547-1, p. 149–150.
- Michael Losse: Kleine Burgenkunde. Regionalia, Euskirchen 2011, ISBN 978-3-939722-39-7.
