= Rietburg =

Ruined castle in Rhineland-Palatinate, Germany

- Rhodt unter Rietburg
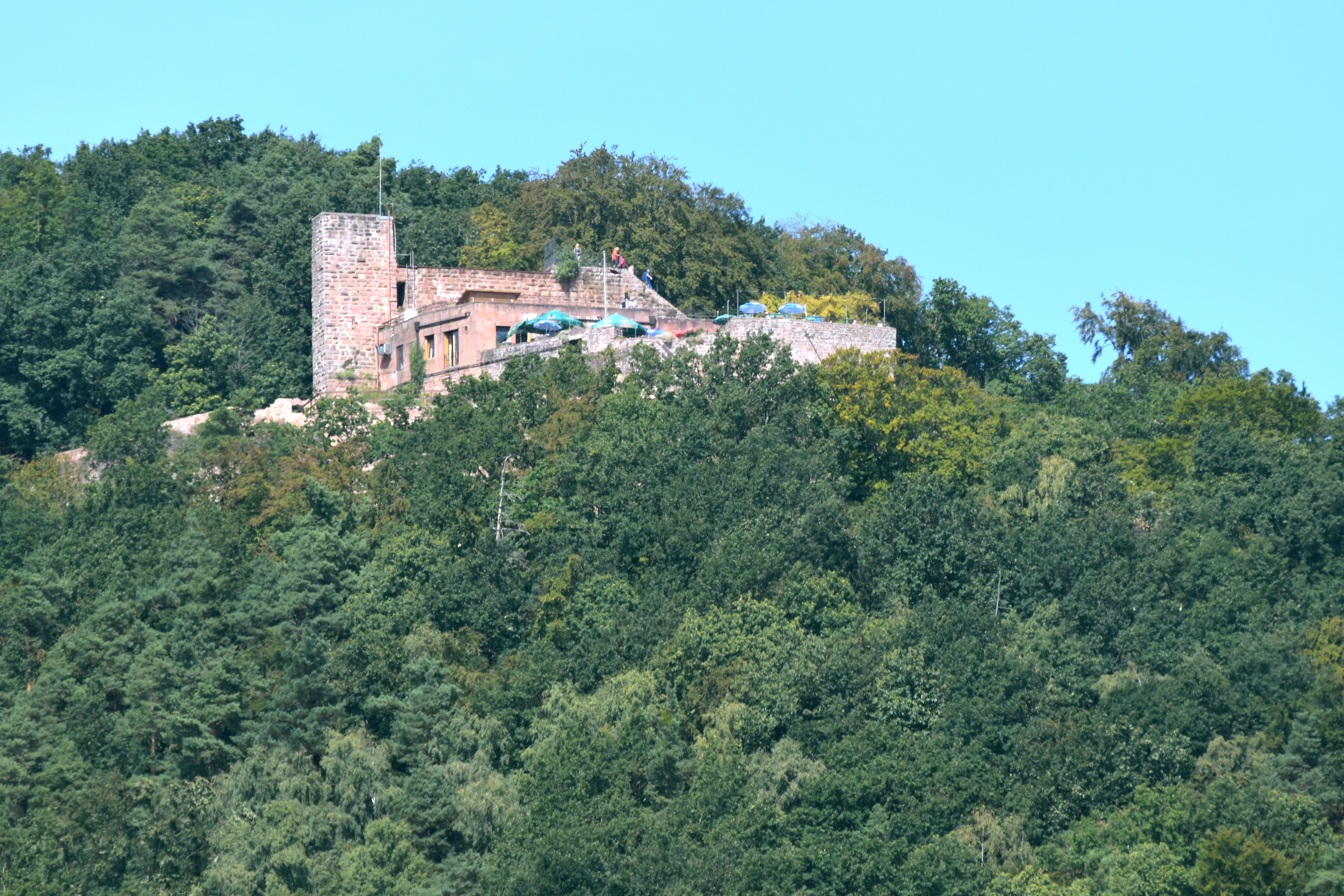
- The Rietburg

Site information
- Type: Hill castle, hillside location
- Code: DE-RP
- Condition: ruin

Location
- Coordinates: 49°16′40″N 8°04′48″E
- Height: 535 m above sea level (NN)

Site history
- Built: 1200–1204

Garrison information
- Occupants: ministeriales

The Rietburg is a ruined hillside castle on the edge of the Palatinate Forest above the village of Rhodt in the county of Südliche Weinstrasse in the German state of Rhineland-Palatinate.

The remains of this castle are located on the side of the 613-metre-high Blättersberg mountain.

== Geography ==
The Rietburg stands at a height of 535 metres above sea level on the northeastern flanks of the 618-metre-high Blättersberg, a peak in the Haardt mountains that form the eastern edge of the Palatinate Forest.

There is a car park at the foot of the Blättersberg near Villa Ludwigshöhe. This may be reached by taking the Edenkoben exit off the A 65 motorway from Karlsruhe to Ludwigshafen am Rhein), then following the road to Rhodt and, subsequently to Rietburg. A chairlift, the Rietburgbahn runs up the mountain.

== Description ==
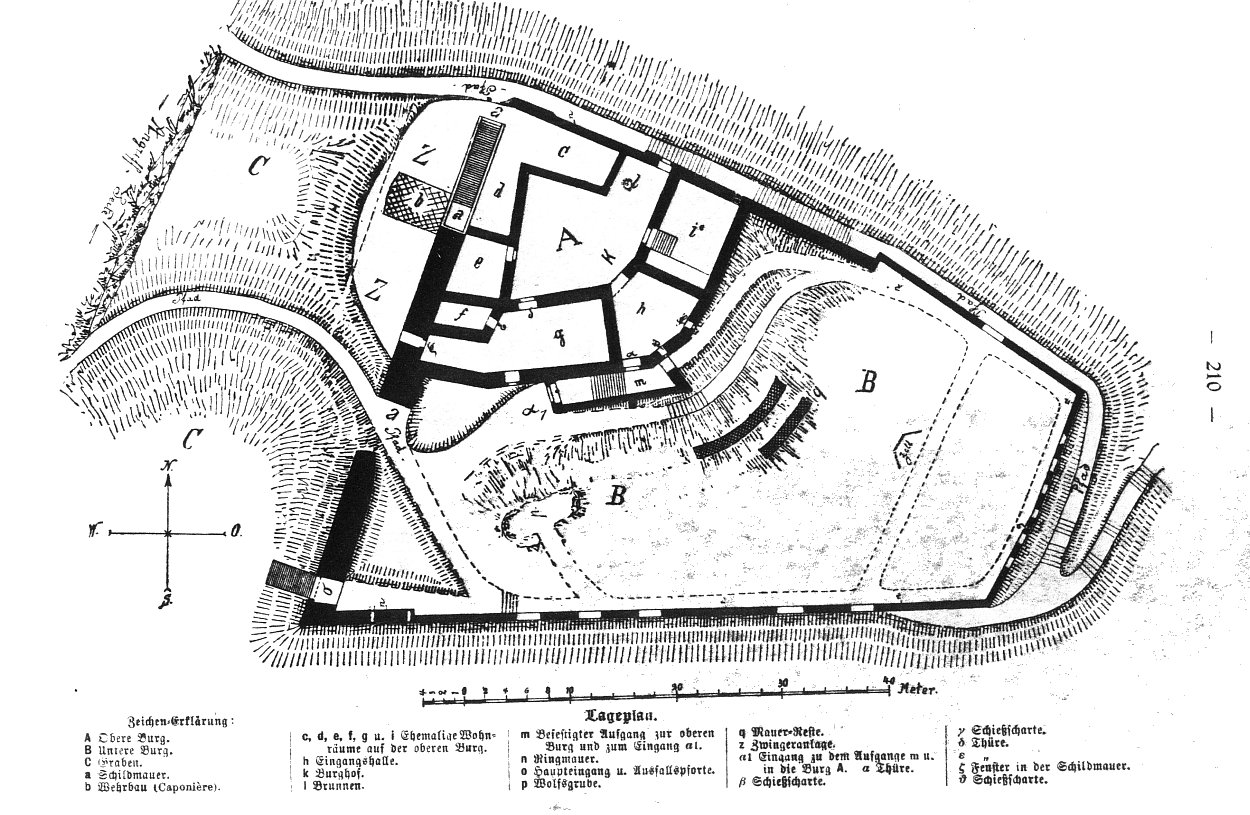
Plan of the ruins

All that has survived of the castle is part of the shield wall, parts of the enceinte and the zwinger.

== History ==
=== Construction ===
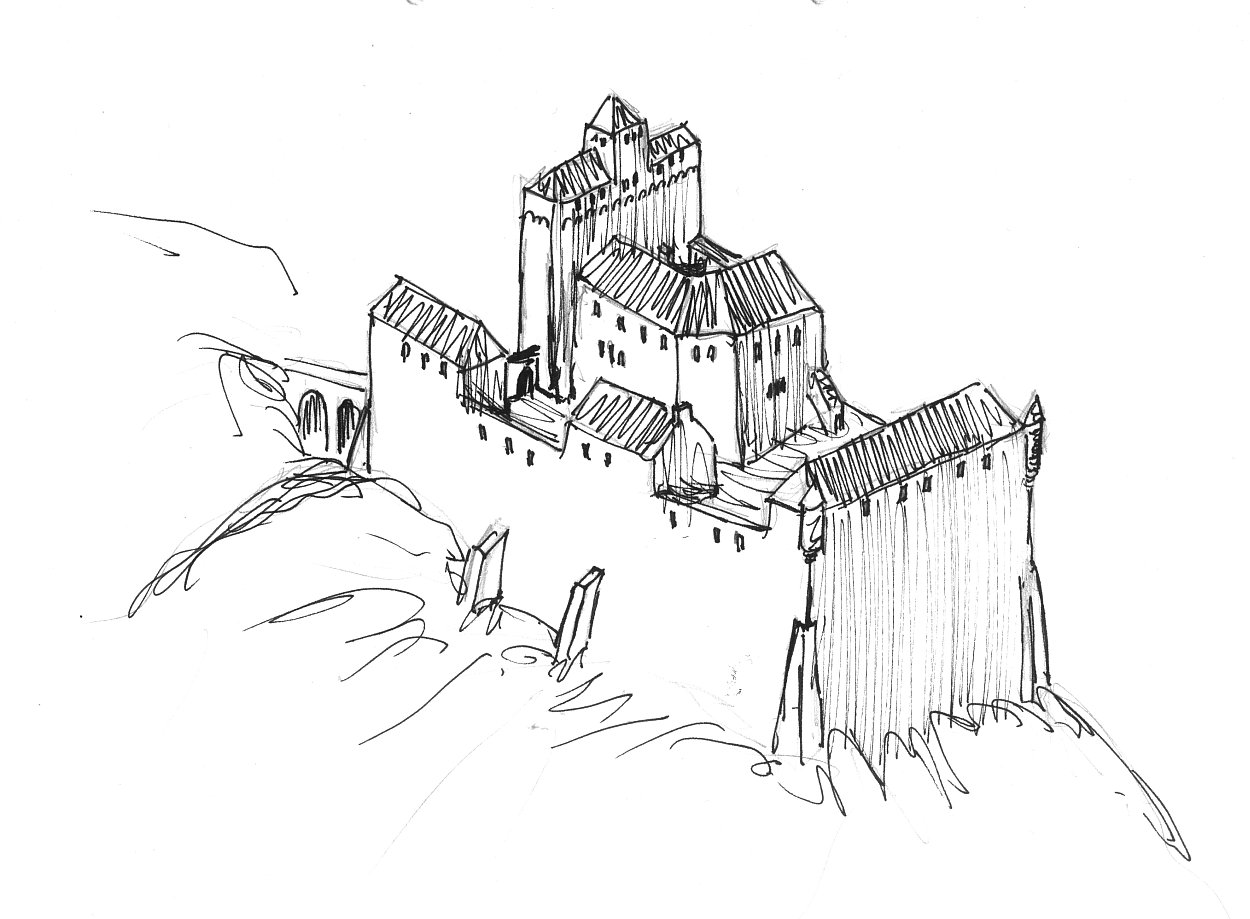
Artist's impression

The construction of Rietburg castle is dated to the period 1200 to 1204 and ascribed to the lords of Riet. These noblemen were initially vassals of the North Alsatian Benedictine abbey of Weißenburg, later they became ministeriales and feudatories of the then German Hohenstaufen lords. The family came from the region between Speyer and Germersheim and had taken their name from their place of origin along the River Rhine that had been colonised by reeds (German: Riet = "reed"). They were first mentioned in 1149 in a deed belonging to the South Palatine abbey of Eußerthal. The castle was built by Conrad II of Riet, the eldest of six sons of Conrad I and his wife, Adelheid, whom he married in 1184.

=== Hostage taking and loss ===
Following the death of Conrad II, his cousin, Hermann of Riet, inherited the lordship of the castle (Burgherrschaft). In the conflicts that broke out after 1250 between the Hohenstaufens and the Welfs he remained a Hohenstaufen follower and went down in history as the result of a political hostage taking: in 1255 he took the Welf Queen Elisabeth, wife of the German king, William hostage, together with her escort during a journey from the episcopal town of Worms to the imperial castle of Trifels near the village of Edesheim. She was imprisoned at the Rietburg. A coalition of regional princes and towns forced him to release his prisoners on 4 December 1255. Hermann escaped with his life, but his castle was seized from him and declared an imperial castle that was under the immediate suzerainty of the king. Its first vassal was the Upper Alsatian Landvogt, Otto III of Ochsenstein. When his daughter married Emich V of Leiningen-Landeck, the castle went in the 1280s to a branch of the House of Leiningen. Later, ownership passed to the Bishopric of Speyer.

=== Decline ===
In 1470, during the Weißenburg Feud between Prince-Elector Frederick the Victorious of the Palatinate and his cousin, Duke Louis the Black of Palatinate-Zweibrücken, the Rietburg was shelled by Leiningen troops and badly damaged, but remained inhabitable. The castle survived the Palatine Peasants' War of 1525 unscathed, but was finally destroyed during the Thirty Years' War (1618–48) and never rebuilt.

=== Excavations and preservation measures ===
During excavations in 1872, 580 gold and silver coins were found, dating to the 16th century. In 1925 the municipality of Rhodt carried out comprehensive preservation work in order to prevent the further ruin of the Rietburg. In 1931 the Palatine Forest Club built a refuge hut in the castle and, in 1955, the castle restaurant was built. Since 1991 the Rietburg Club has worked on the conservation of the site. For example, in 2012 25,000 € was invested in a wooden bridge over the historic neck ditch, which was probably originally spanned by a drawbridge.

== Legend ==
According to the legend of the robber baron at the Rietburg "Once a robber baron lived at the castle (which was also called the altes Schloss or "old palace"); he was said to be a "wild vulture with the hideous face of Satan." He lay in wait for people and dragged them off to his eyrie as booty. He was especially hated by the women. One day he robbed a young girl who was gentle as a dove. The girl's father went with some followers up to the castle and tried in vain to storm it. The baron stood was on the battlements laughing and demanded a ransom from the girl's father. For a large amount of gold and valuable mineral ore he would get his daughter back. After the ransom was paid, the baron gave the father his daughter back - by throwing her off the battlements. As the girl lay dashed to pieces on the ground, the robber burst out laughing. At this, all the "warriors" stormed the castle en masse and chased the baron off the wall. Ever since, the evil spirit of the baron has had to restlessly run through the night."

== Present use ==
=== Tourism ===
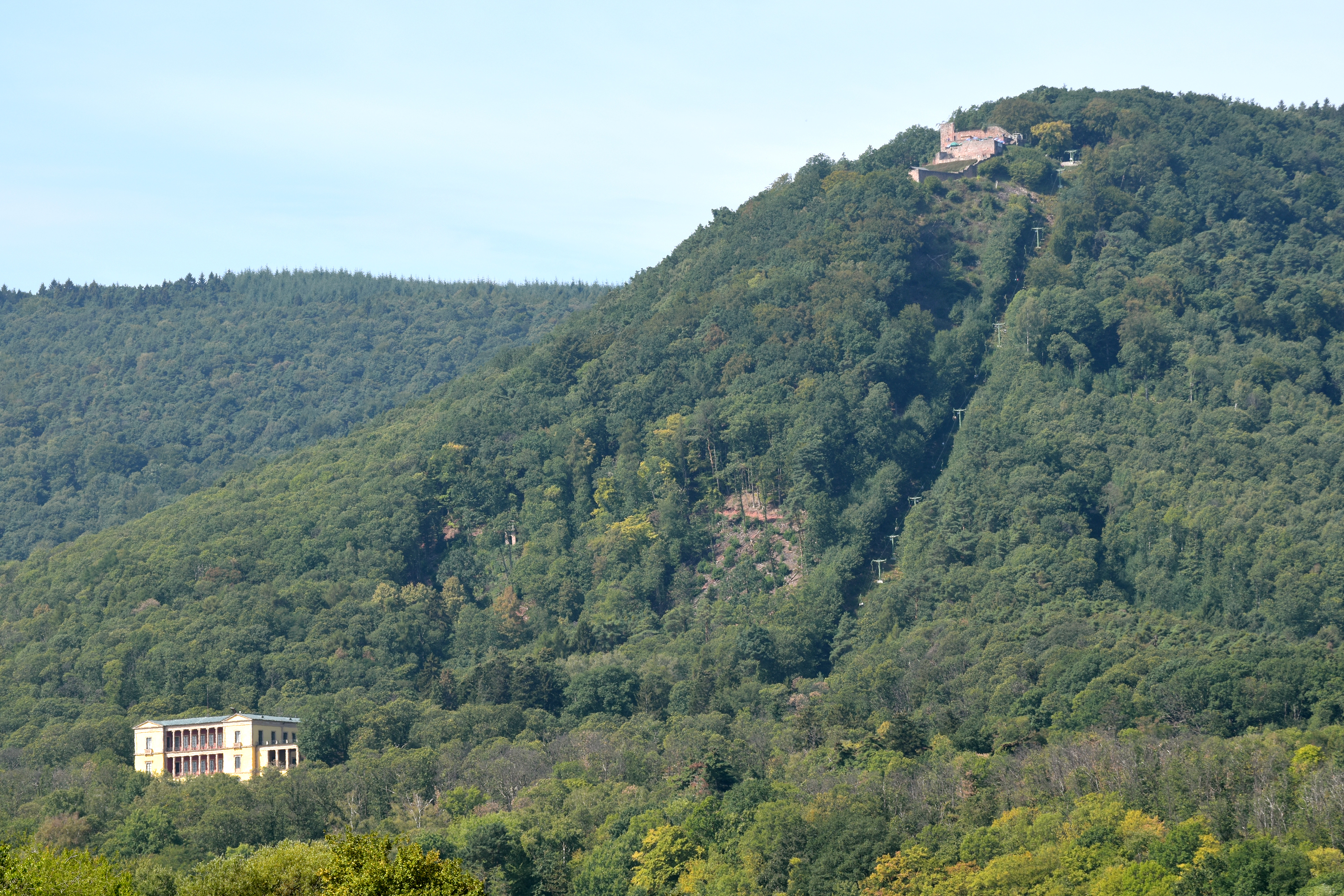
Blättersberg with Rietburg and Villa Ludwigshöhe, view from Edenkoben

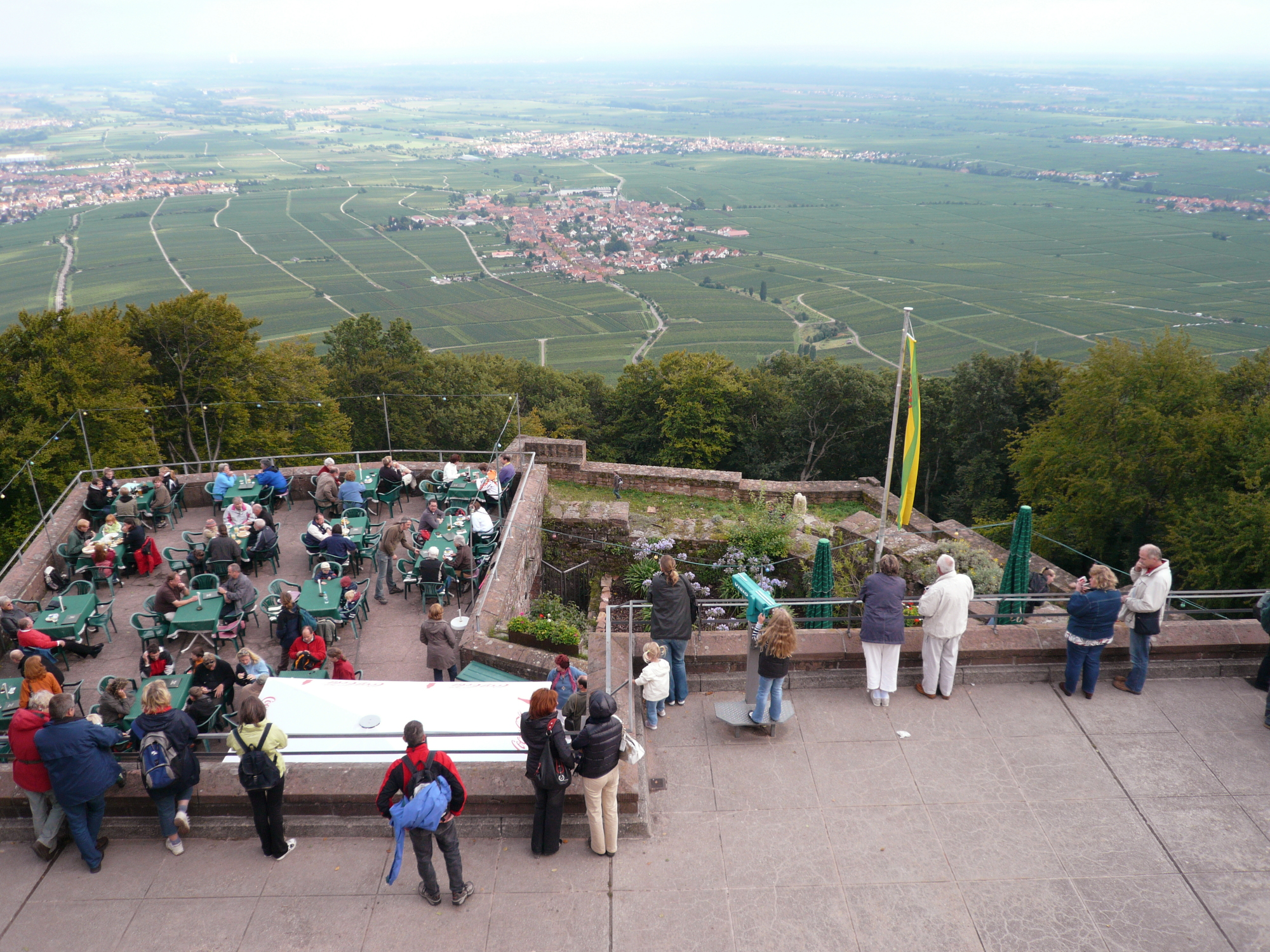
Observation point on the Rietburg

Since 1954, a chair lift, known as the Rietburgbahn has run from the Rhine Plain up to a terrace on the eastern side of the Rietburg. The return journey offers good views over the plain. The bottom station is accessible on foot or by car and is located near the schloss of Villa Ludwigshöhe, a stately residence built from 1846 to 1852 by order of Louis I of Bavaria.

The top station of the Rietburgbahn lies just a few steps away from the castle ruins and a pub, the Höhengaststätte Rietburg has been incorporated into it, which has an open-air terrace with extensive views over the Rhine Plain. From here the whole Bergstraße Route may be seen across the plain from Melibokus in the north to the Königstuhl near Heidelberg. The view continues to Steinsberg near Sinsheim, the highest point of the Kraichgau region; and in clear visibility the Heuchelberg and Stromberg may be seen. To the southeast is the Northern Black Forest from the Badener Höhe via the Mehliskopf to the Hornisgrinde. In exceptionally clear weather, the tall houses of Frankfurt (Westendstraße 1) may be seen to the far north-northeast, to the east Katzenbuckel (immediately left of the Königstuhl) and to the south-southeast, the Central Black Forest as far as Kenzingen, where the Black Forest descends eastwards into the Freiburg Bay.

=== Sport ===
The Rietburg is the venue for the International Rietburg Hill Run every September, a race which is part of the Palatine Hill Running Cup. It is 8,200 metres long and climbs 420 metres.

== Vineyard ==
A major local vineyard, which is in the Palatine wine region, has been named Rietburg after the castle.

== Literature ==
- Alexander Thon; Stefan Ulrich (2009), Rhodt unter Rietburg – Burgruine Rietburg : Schnell-Kunstführer Nr. 2739 (in German), Regensburg: Verlag Schnell und Steiner, ISBN 978-3-7954-6831-6
- Alexander Thon (2006), "...umb sunderlichen frieden, fromen und notz des landes : Belagerung und Untergang pfälzisch-elsässischer Burgen im Mittelalter", in Olaf Wagner; Heiko Laß (eds.), ...wurfen hin in steine / grôze und niht kleine... Belagerungen und Belagerungsanlagen im Mittelalter (in German), vol. Beihefte zur Mediaevistik, Heft 7, Frankfurt am Main u. a.: Verlag Lang, pp. 241–268, hier 65–71, ISBN 3-631-55467-2
- Alexander Thon, ed. (2005), Wie Schwalbennester an den Felsen geklebt : Burgen in der Nordpfalz (in German) (1 ed.), Regensburg: Verlag Schnell und Steiner, pp. 136–141, ISBN 3-7954-1674-4
