= Ehrenfels Castle (Hesse) =

Ruined hillside castle in Hesse, Germany

- Burg Ehrenfels
- Rüdesheim am Rhein
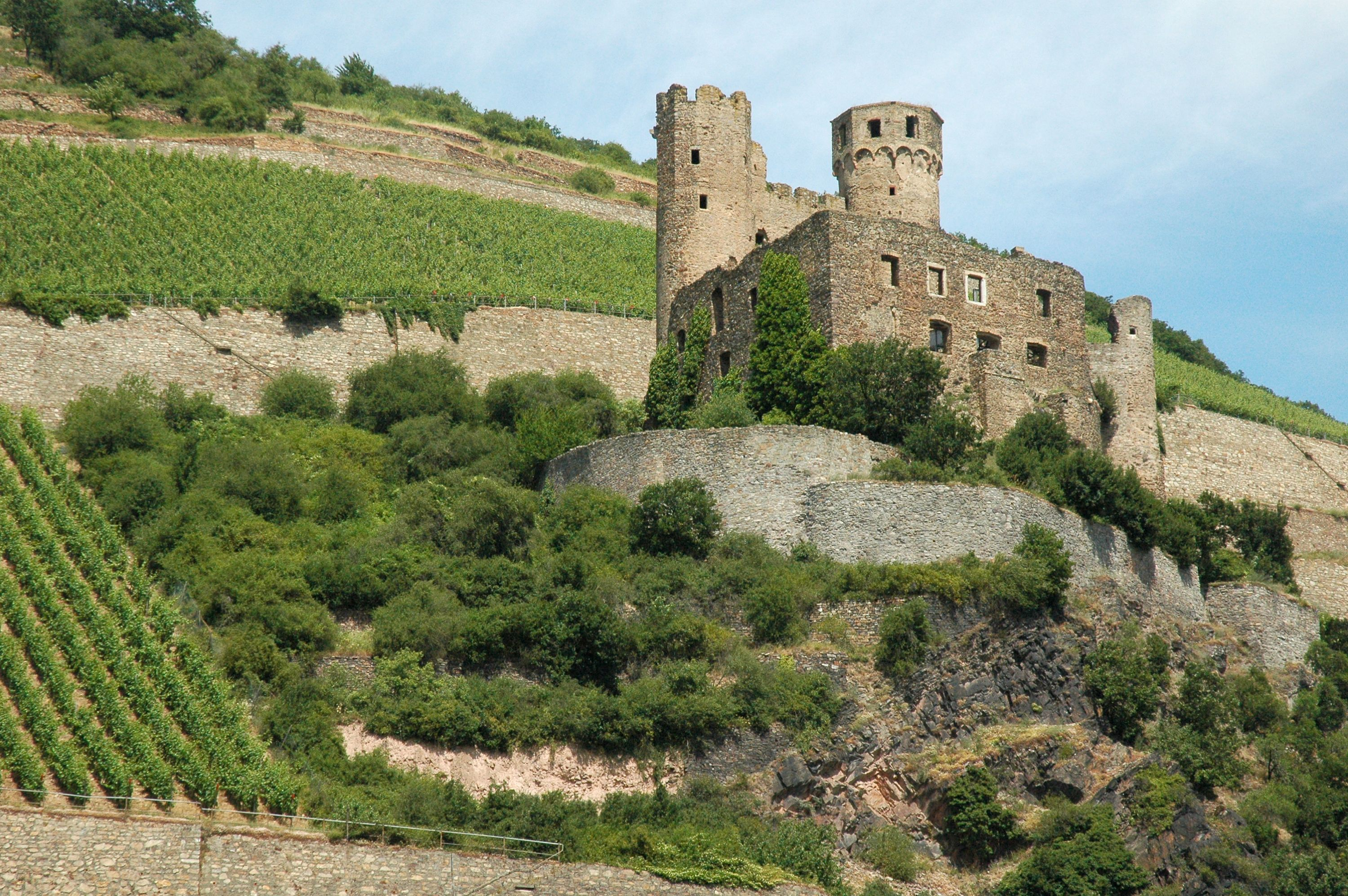

Site information
- Type: Medieval castle
- Owner: State of Hesse
- Condition: Ruin

Location
- Coordinates: 49°58′31″N 7°52′50″E

Site history
- Built: 1212
- Built by: Philipp von Bolanden
- Demolished: 1689

Ehrenfels Castle (German: Burg Ehrenfels) is a ruined hillside castle above the Rhine Gorge near the town of Rüdesheim am Rhein in Hesse, Germany. It is located on the steep eastern bank of the river amid extended vineyards. The grape variety Ehrenfelser is named after the castle.

== History ==
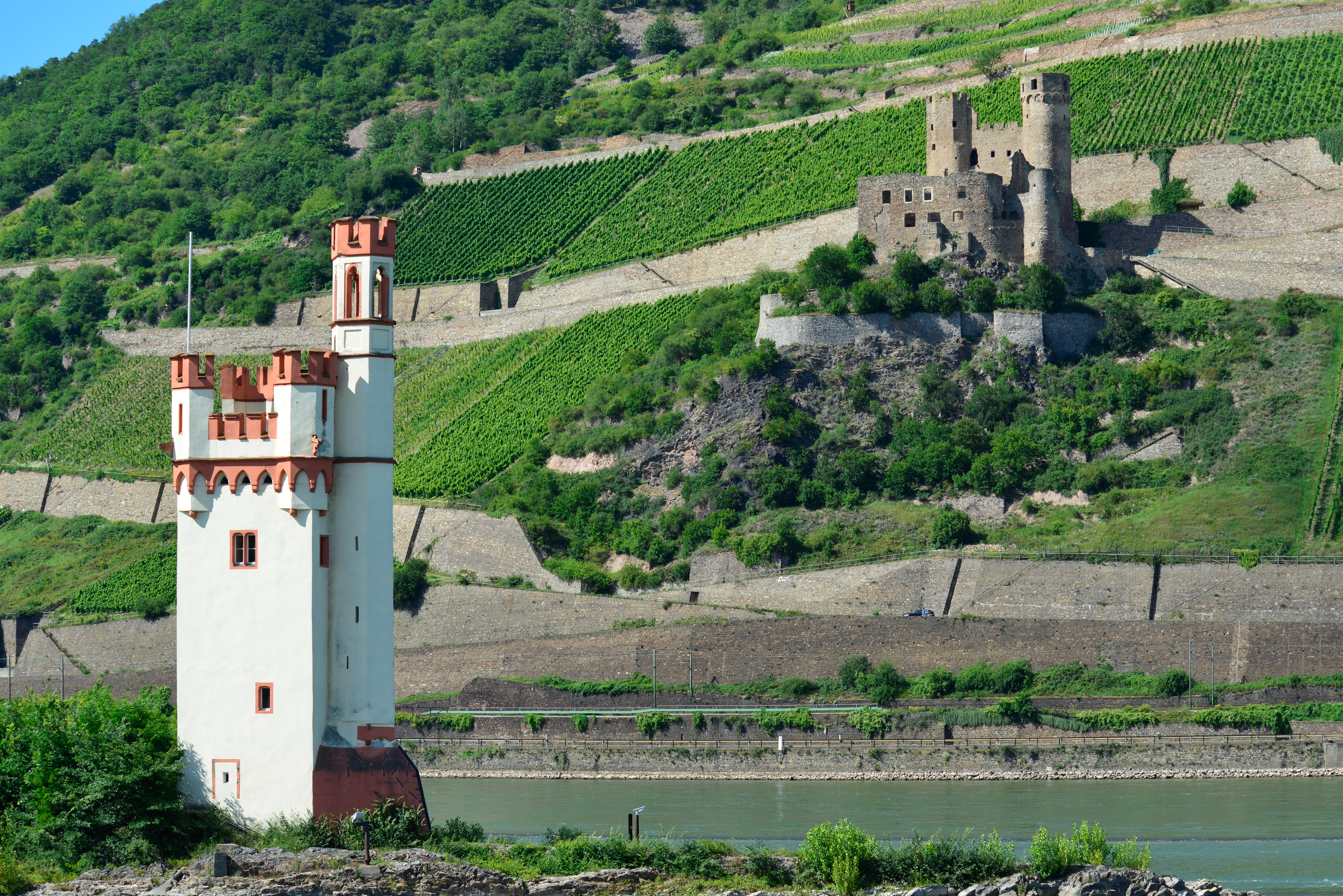
Ehrenfels and Mouse Tower

It was (re-)built about 1212 at the behest of the Archbishop of Mainz as a defensive work against the constant attacks by Elector Palatine Henry V, who, as Imperial vicar of Franconia, strived to cut down the archbishop's reach. Mainz staffed the castle with Burgmannen and erected a customs post controlling the shipping on the Rhine, supplemented by the Mouse Tower below at the river. Heavily damaged in the course of the Thirty Years' War, the castle was finally devastated by French troops under the command of Lieutenant General Nicolas Chalon du Blé during the 1689 Siege of Mainz.

== Today ==
The ruin can be reached from Rüdesheim via a hiking trail through the vineyards. The interior however can only be visited in guided tours by prior appointment.

== Sources and external links ==
- www.loreley-info.com/eng/rhein-rhine/castles/ehrenfels.php
