= Villa Ludwigshöhe =

Summer residence of Ludwig I of Bavaria

Coordinates: 49.280°N 8.090°E

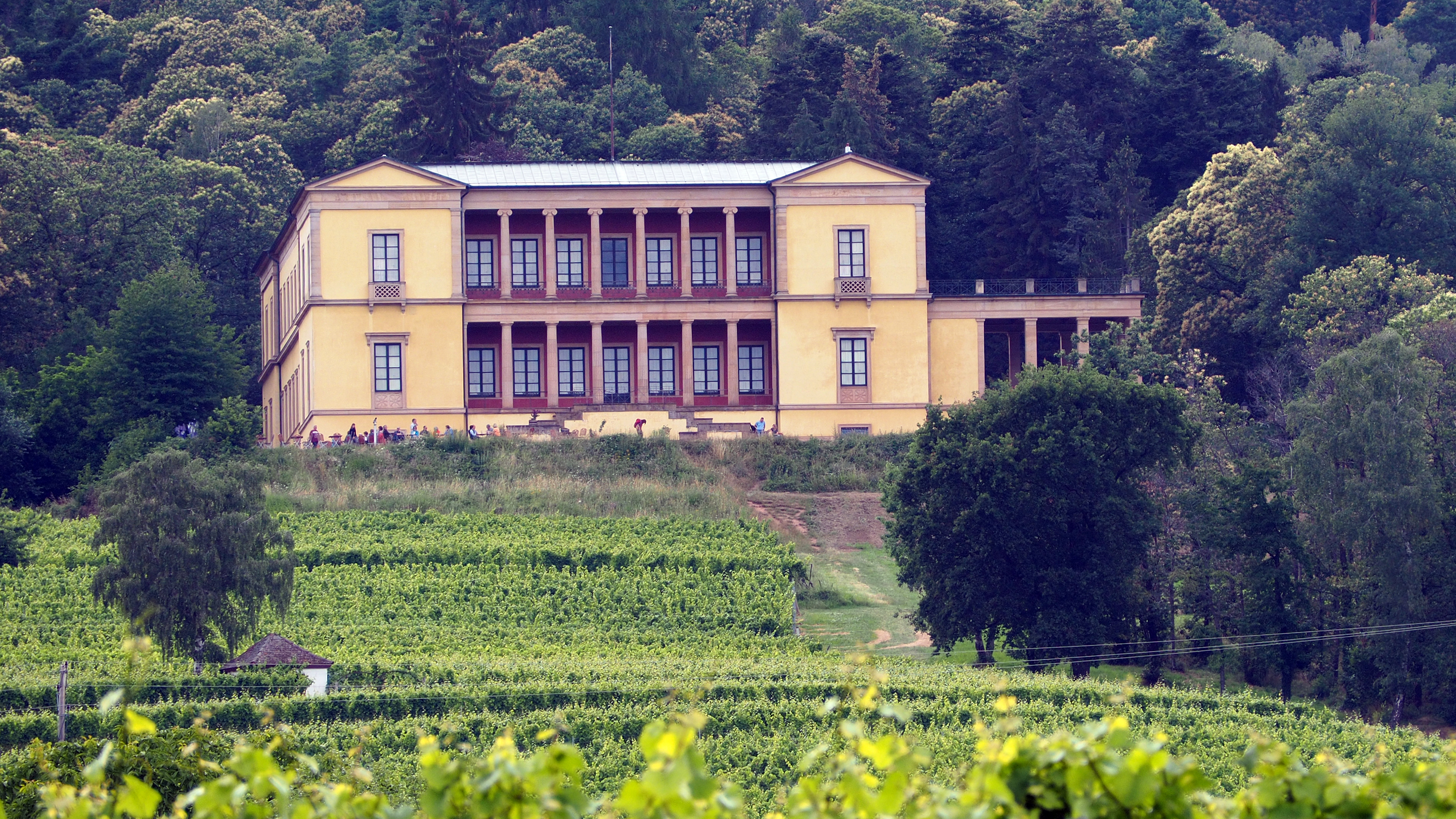
Villa Ludwigshöhe

Villa Ludwigshöhe is a former summer residence of Ludwig I of Bavaria overlooking Edenkoben and Rhodt unter Rietburg in Rhineland-Palatinate, Germany.

== Geography ==
Villa Ludwigshöhe is located at the eastern edge of the Palatinate Forest, west of the small-town of Edenkoben and the municipality Rhodt unter Rietburg in the Southern Palatinate. Next to the Villa is the lower station of the "Rietburgbahn" chairlift, by which the Rietburg can be reached; it is also accessible by road.

== Architectural history ==
In 1843 King Ludwig I decided to build a summer villa. At that time the Palatinate (from which his father Maximilian I came) belonged to Bavaria. It was to be constructed on the edge of the Haardt hills. In 1845 the necessary parcels of land were bought from the municipalities Edenkoben and Rhodt.

The foundation stone was laid in 1846. The Villa was built by Joseph Hoffmann (Ludwigshafen/Rhine) according to plans from architect Friedrich Wilhelm von Gärtner. In 1847 the architect died and Leo von Klenze took care of the site management. The building was finished in 1852.

Ludwig I lived in the Villa every two years during July and August, and also celebrated his birthday there. His last visit to the Villa was in 1866.

== Building ==
The main building consists of four rectangular two-storey buildings, grouped around an atrium. The style is classical.
