= Hainfeld, Germany =

Hainfeld
- Municipality
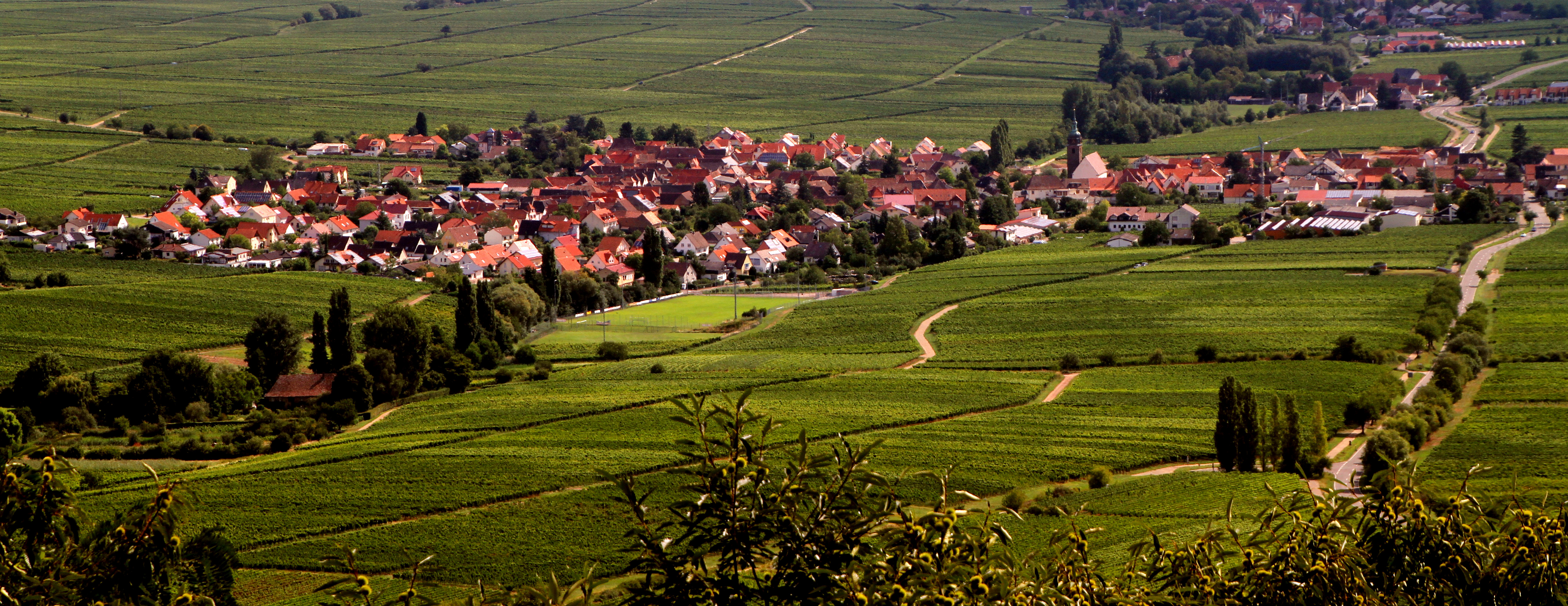

- Coat of arms

- Location of Hainfeld within Südliche Weinstraße district
- Interactive map of Hainfeld
- Location within Germany Location within Rhineland-Palatinate
- Coordinates: 49°15′30″N 8°06′00″E
- Country: Germany
- State: Rhineland-Palatinate
- District: Südliche Weinstraße
- Municipal assoc.: Edenkoben

Government
  - Mayor (2019–24): Wolfgang Schwarz

Area
  - Total: 6.23 km^{2} (2.41 sq mi)
- Elevation: 182 m (597 ft)

Population (2025-12-31)
  - Total: 882
  - Density: 142/km^{2} (367/sq mi)
- Time zone: UTC+01:00 (CET)
  - Summer (DST): UTC+02:00 (CEST)
- Postal codes: 76835
- Dialling codes: 06323
- Vehicle registration: SÜW
- Website: www.hainfeld.de

Hainfeld is a municipality in Südliche Weinstraße district, in Rhineland-Palatinate, western Germany.
