= Rhodt unter Rietburg =

- Municipality
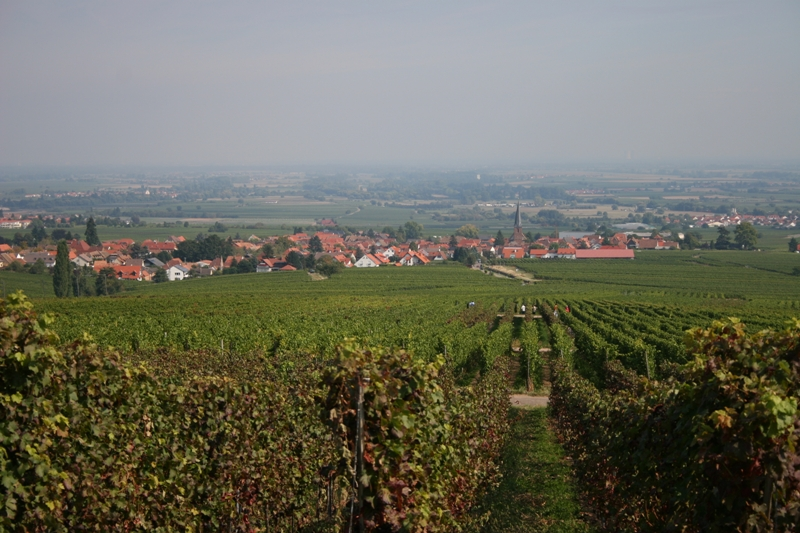
- View on Rhodt from Weyher

- Coat of arms

- Location of Rhodt unter Rietburg within Südliche Weinstraße district
- Interactive map of Rhodt unter Rietburg
- Location within Germany Location within Rhineland-Palatinate
- Coordinates: 49°16′22″N 8°06′29″E
- Country: Germany
- State: Rhineland-Palatinate
- District: Südliche Weinstraße
- Municipal assoc.: Edenkoben

Government
  - Mayor (2019–24): Armin Pister

Area
  - Total: 10.06 km^{2} (3.88 sq mi)
- Elevation: 206 m (676 ft)

Population (2025-12-31)
  - Total: 1,130
  - Density: 112/km^{2} (291/sq mi)
- Time zone: UTC+01:00 (CET)
  - Summer (DST): UTC+02:00 (CEST)
- Postal codes: 76835
- Dialling codes: 06323
- Vehicle registration: SÜW
- Website: www.rhodt.de

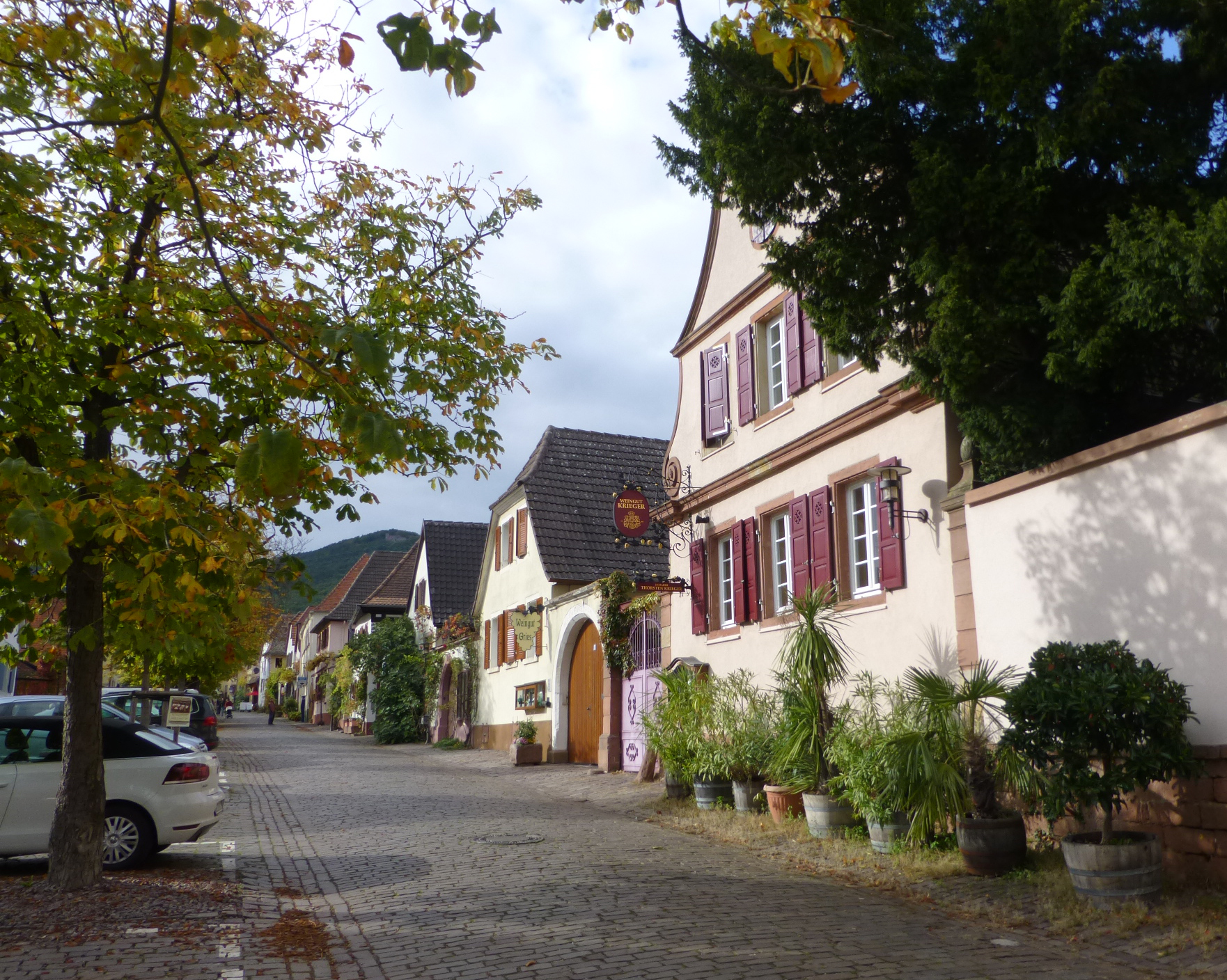
The Theresienstrasse is the most famous street of Rhodt unter Rietburg

Rhodt unter Rietburg (German pronunciation: [ˈʁoːt ʔʊntɐ ˈʁiːtbʊʁk], lit. 'Rhodt under Rietburg') is a municipality in Südliche Weinstraße district, in Rhineland-Palatinate, western Germany. Rietburg castle (ruins) is located on a nearby hill. The village has been making wine for over 1200 years, and is one of the centres of Palatine wine as a home of Rietburg wine co-operative.
