= Edesheim =

German municipality

- Municipality
- Location of Edesheim within Südliche Weinstraße district
- Interactive map of Edesheim
- Location within Germany Location within Rhineland-Palatinate
- Coordinates: 49°16′N 8°8′E
- Country: Germany
- State: Rhineland-Palatinate
- District: Südliche Weinstraße
- Municipal assoc.: Edenkoben

Government
  - Mayor (2019–24): Sigrid Schwedhelm-Schreiner (FW)

Area
  - Total: 16.32 km^{2} (6.30 sq mi)
- Elevation: 151 m (495 ft)

Population (2025-12-31)
  - Total: 2,501
  - Density: 153.2/km^{2} (396.9/sq mi)
- Time zone: UTC+01:00 (CET)
  - Summer (DST): UTC+02:00 (CEST)
- Postal codes: 67483
- Dialling codes: 06323
- Vehicle registration: SÜW
- Website: www.edesheim.de

Edesheim (German pronunciation: [ˈeːdəshaɪm]) is a municipality in the Südliche Weinstraße district, in Rhineland-Palatinate, Germany. Paul Henri Thiry d’Holbach was born here.

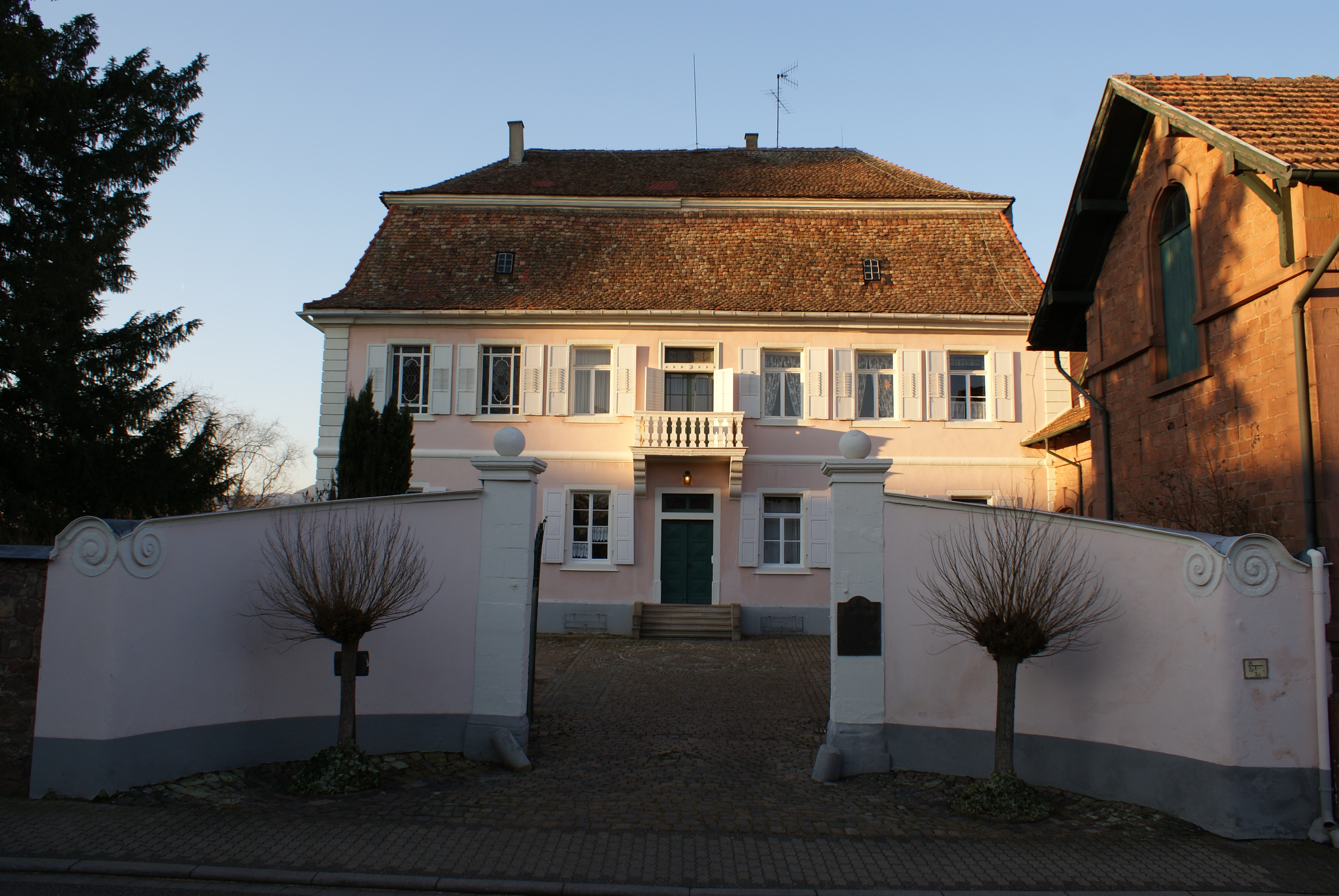
House of Franz Adam Holbach (approx. 1675–1753) the uncle of Paul Henri Thiry d’Holbach

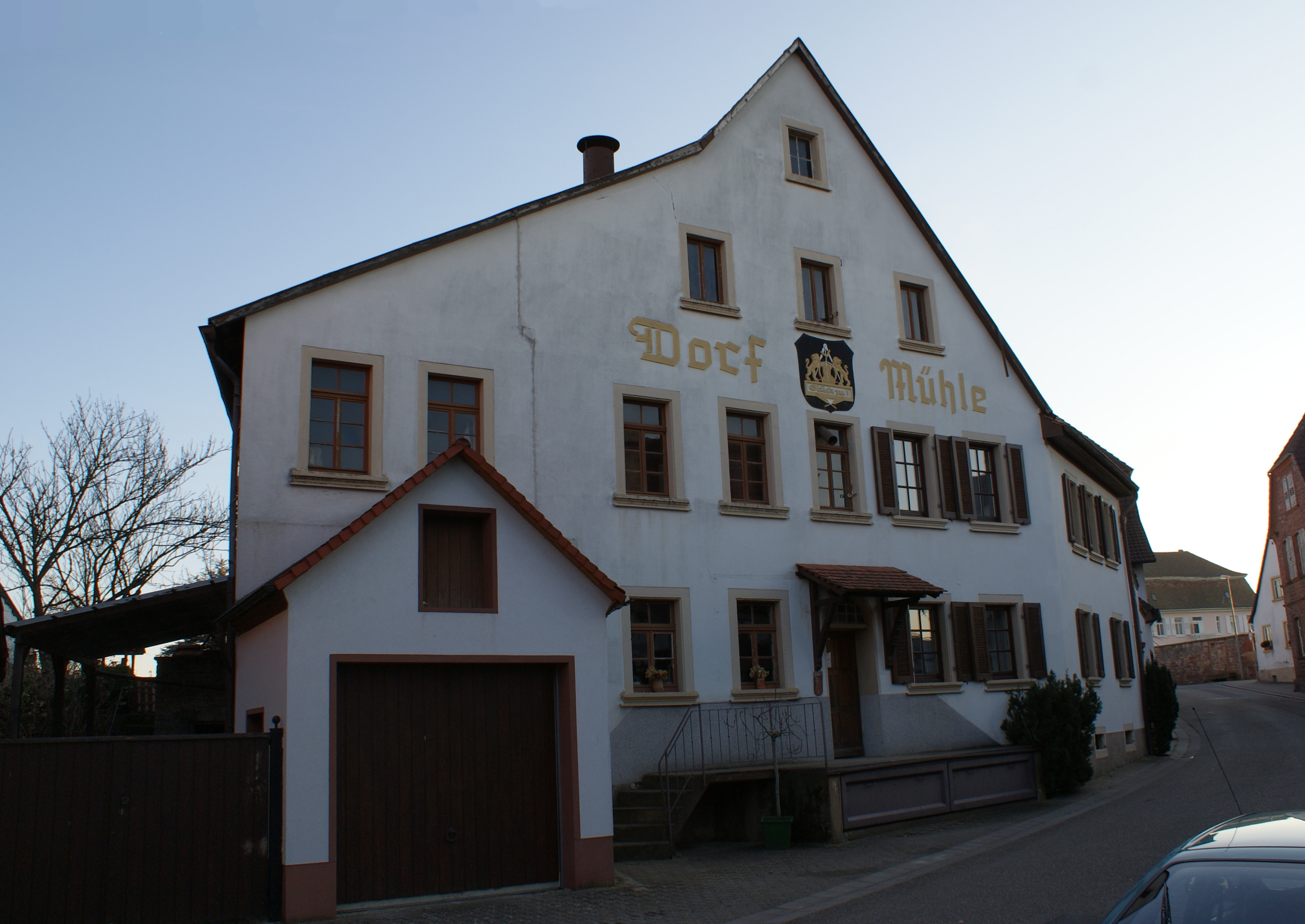
Millhouse, first mentioned in 1354

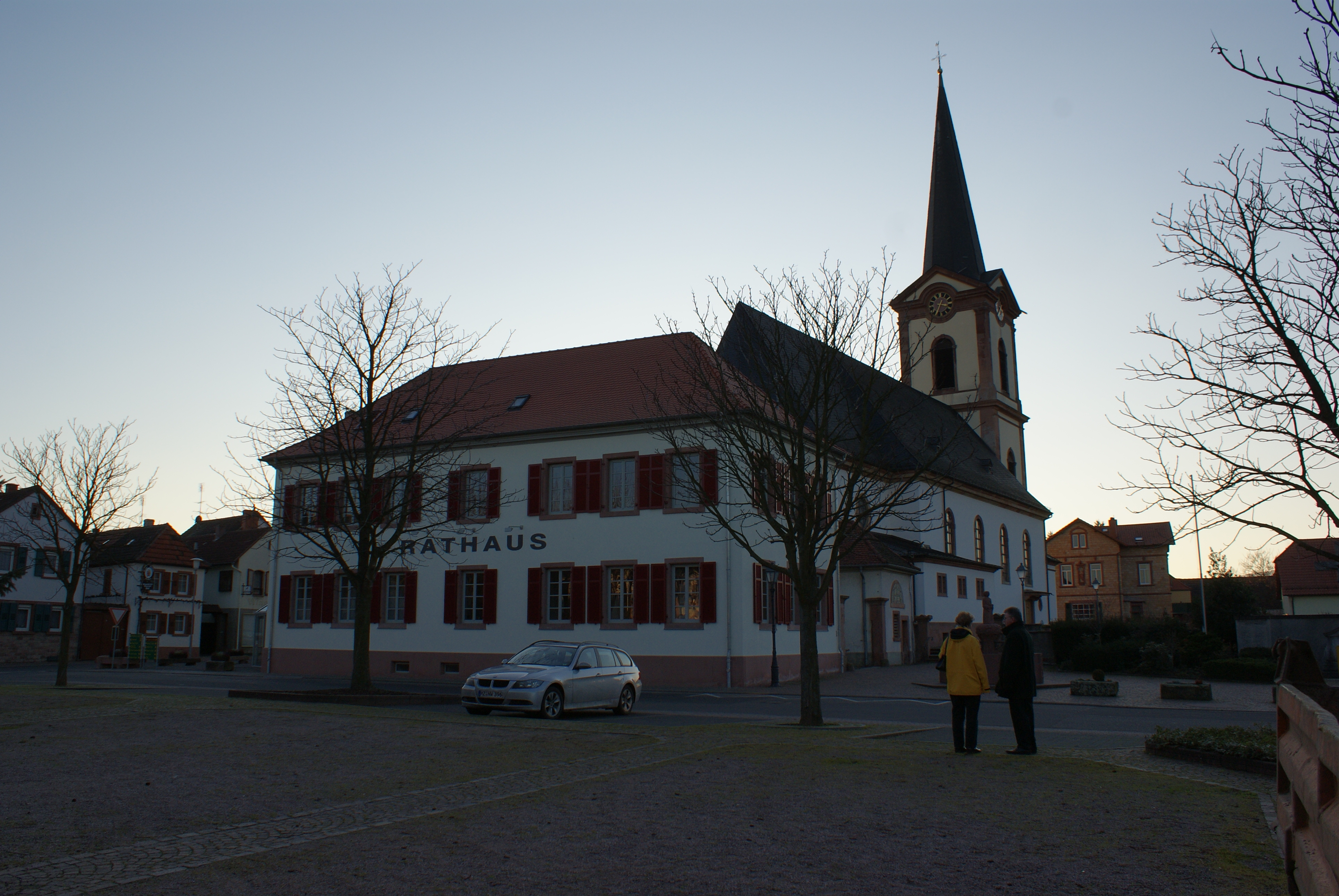
Cityhall and Church
