= Weyher in der Pfalz =

- Municipality
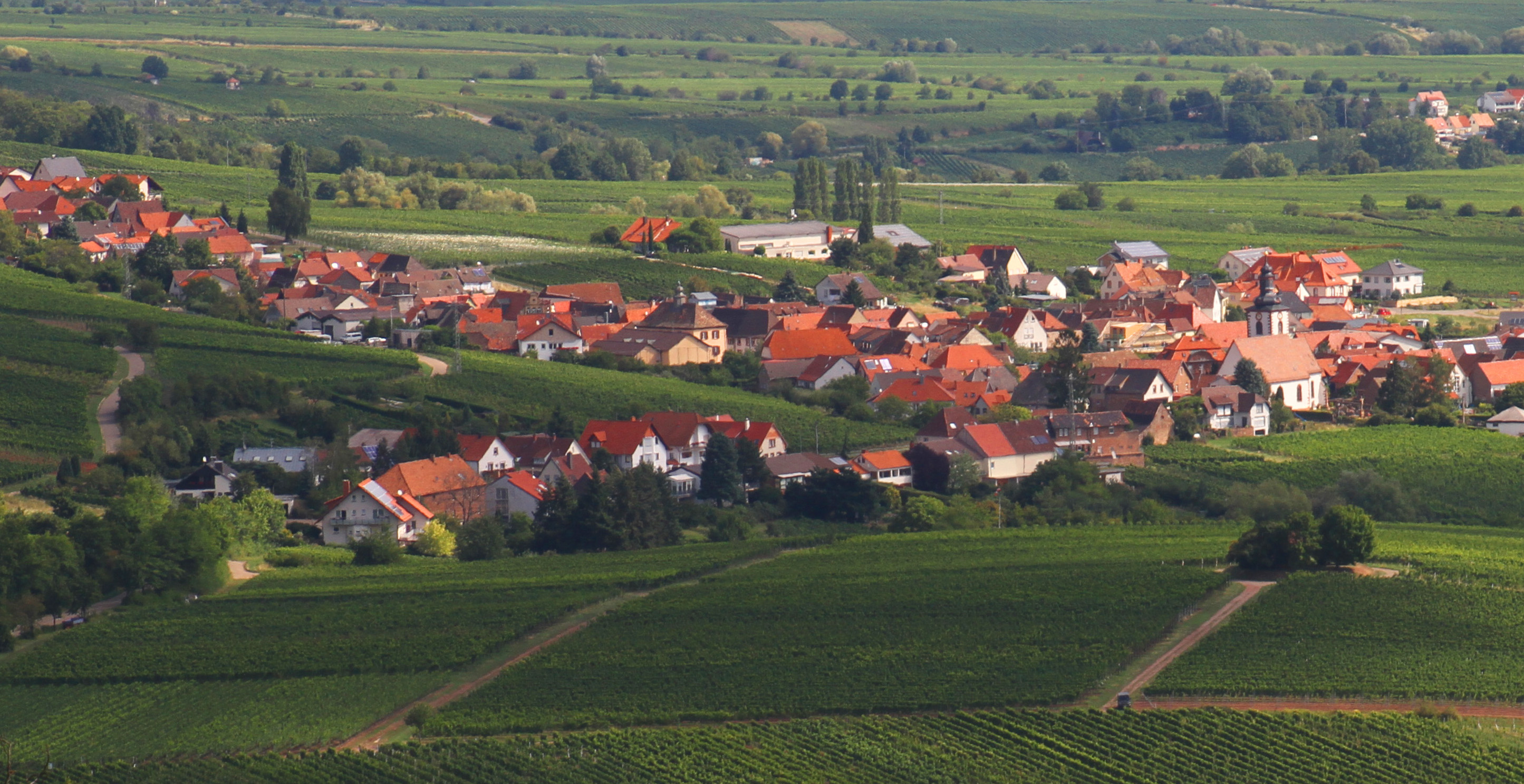

- Coat of arms

- Location of Weyher in der Pfalz within Südliche Weinstraße district
- Interactive map of Weyher in der Pfalz
- Location within Germany Location within Rhineland-Palatinate
- Coordinates: 49°16′09″N 8°05′00″E
- Country: Germany
- State: Rhineland-Palatinate
- District: Südliche Weinstraße
- Municipal assoc.: Edenkoben

Government
  - Mayor (2019–24): Andreas Möwes

Area
  - Total: 5.16 km^{2} (1.99 sq mi)
- Elevation: 267 m (876 ft)

Population (2025-12-31)
  - Total: 542
  - Density: 105/km^{2} (272/sq mi)
- Time zone: UTC+01:00 (CET)
  - Summer (DST): UTC+02:00 (CEST)
- Postal codes: 76835
- Dialling codes: 06323
- Vehicle registration: SÜW
- Website: www.weyher.de

Weyher in der Pfalz (German pronunciation: [ˈvaɪɐ ʔɪn deːɐ̯ ˈpfalts]) is a municipality in Südliche Weinstraße district, in Rhineland-Palatinate, western Germany with a stable population of around 500, populated for over 1200 years. It is situated in the foothills of a chestnut tree forest, overlooking the Rhine valley. It is known for its wine production and there are holiday apartments in the village. Ludwig I of Bavaria kept a summer apartment in the cliffs directly overlooking the village, which opens quarterly for village celebrations.
