= Haardt =

Range of hills in Rheinland-Palatinate

Coordinates: 49°19′55″N 8°5′30″E

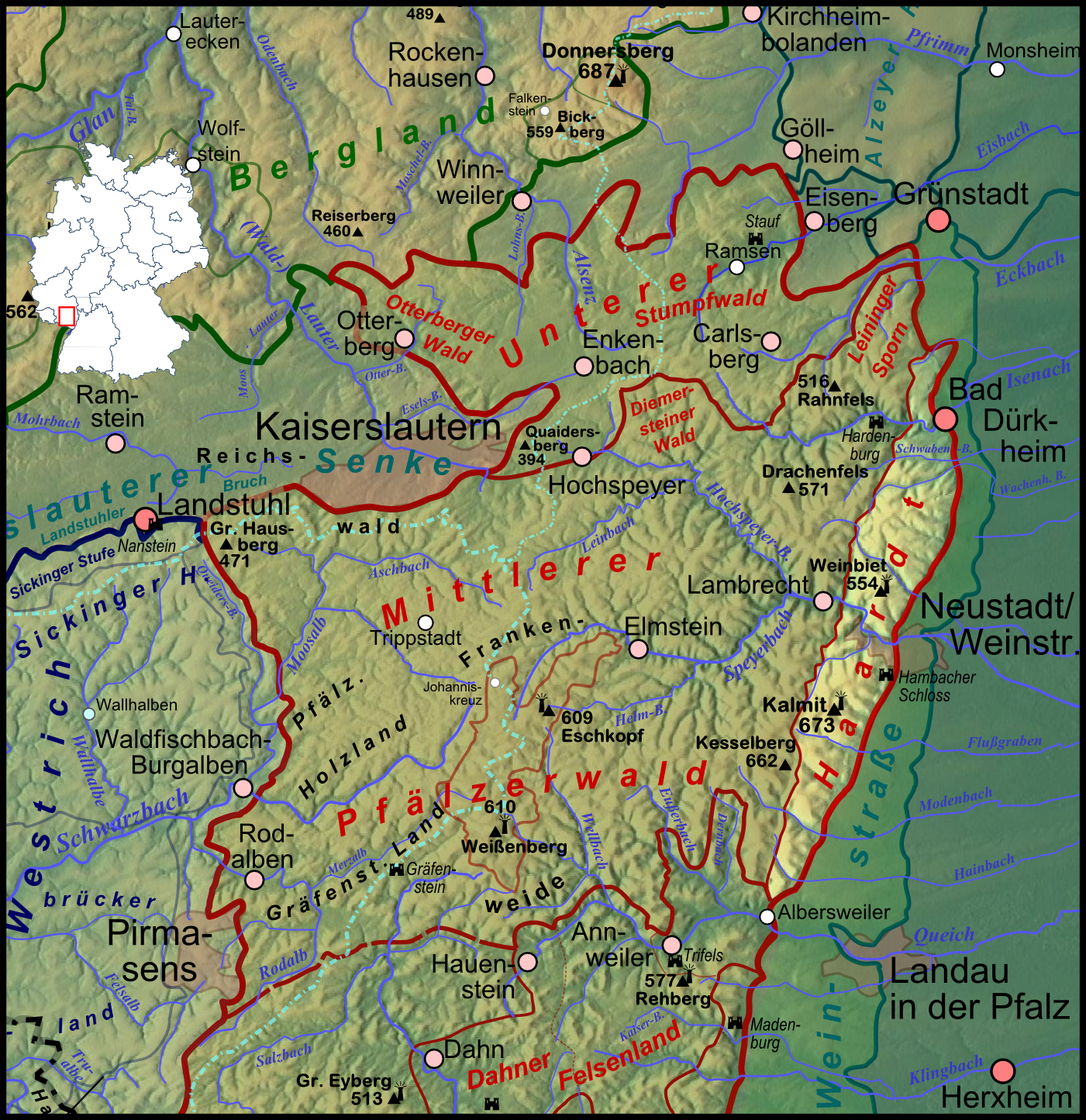
The Haardt in the east of the Palatine Forest

The Haardt (German pronunciation: [ˈhaːɐ̯t]) is a range of wooded, sandstone hills in the state of Rhineland-Palatinate in southwestern Germany. The range is some 85 kilometres (53 mi) long and lies within the Palatinate Forest (Pfälzerwald). Its highest point is the Kalmit, near Maikammer, which stands 672.6 metres (2,207 ft) above sea level.
