= Drachenfels (Central Palatinate Forest) =

Hill in Germany

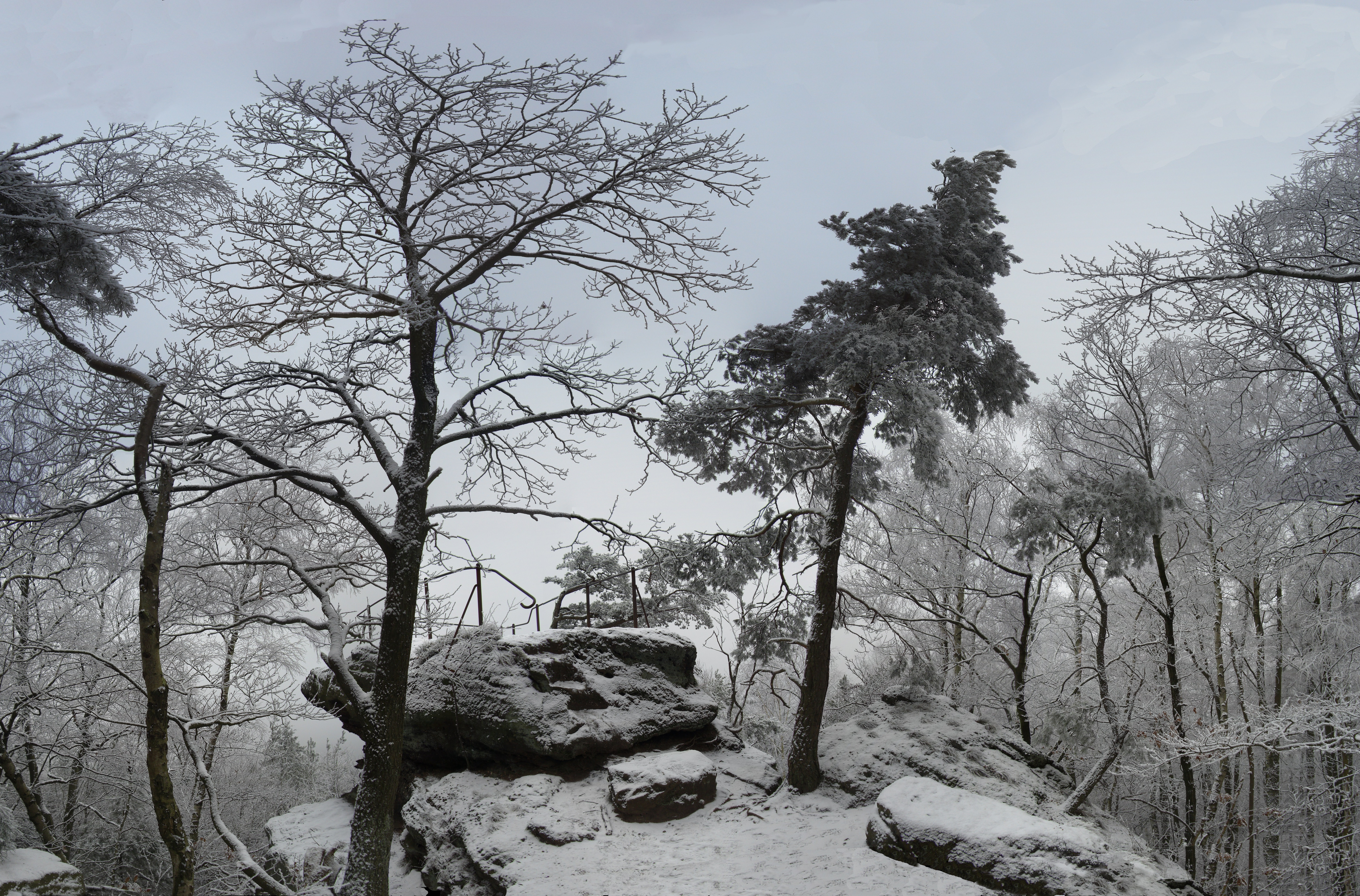
- The Westfelsen rocks in winter

Highest point
- Elevation: 570.8 m above sea level (NHN) (1,873 ft)
- Prominence: 261 m ↓ Hochspeyer
- Isolation: 11.6 km
- Coordinates: 49°25′30″N 8°03′11″E

Geography
- Location within Rhineland-Palatinate
- Location: Rhineland-Palatinate (Germany)
- Parent range: Palatine Forest

Geology
- Mountain type: Bunter sandstone

Climbing
- Access: 1873 (Remnants of a Roman fortification)

The Drachenfels ("Dragon Rock") is a hill in the northern part of the Palatine Forest in the German state of Rhineland-Palatinate) on the forest estate of the county town of Bad Dürkheim. At 570.8 m above sea level (NHN), it is the highest point of the Palatine Forest north of the Hochspeyerbach - Speyerbach line. The Drachenfels area has been designated as a nature reserve.

== Geography ==
=== Location ===
The hill lies in the west of a triangle whose sides are about 14 kilometres long, formed by the Isenach valley (B 37) in the north, the German Wine Route in the east and the valleys of the Hochspeyerbach and Speyerbach streams (B 39) in the southwest.

=== Surrounding area ===
Other tourist destinations in the area of the Drachenfels include the Siegfriedsbrunnen spring, the unoccupied forester's lodge of Kehrdichannichts, the ruins of the Murrmirnichtviel and Schaudichnichtum forester's lodges, the Lambertskreuz cross, first recorded in 1280 and the oldest wayside cross in the Palatinate region, the managed Lambertskreuz Hut, the Saupferch forest inn and the leisure and wildlife park of, the Kurpfalz Park.

== Description ==
The summit plateau, made of Bunter sandstone and about 13 hectares in area, which, from the Rhine Plain is clearly higher than the hills in front of it, has its highest point in the northeast. It was made a nature reserve in 1972. Until 1920, a pair of short-toed snake eagles nested here.

The name of the hill is – like that of the nearby Siegfriedsbrunnen spring – connected with the dragon from the Nibelung legend. Below the rock that juts out far to the southwest there are two caves; the small one is called the "Dragon's Chamber" (Drachenkammer), the larger one, the "Dragon's Lair" (Drachenhöhle). In the west of the plateau the remnants of a fortification from Roman times have survived; the former circular rampart is only just recognizable under the vegetation. From the so-called "West Rocks" (Westfelsen) in the northwest may be seen the Donnersberg, the summit of the Hunsrück range, to the north, and the city of Kaiserslautern to the west.

== Gallery ==
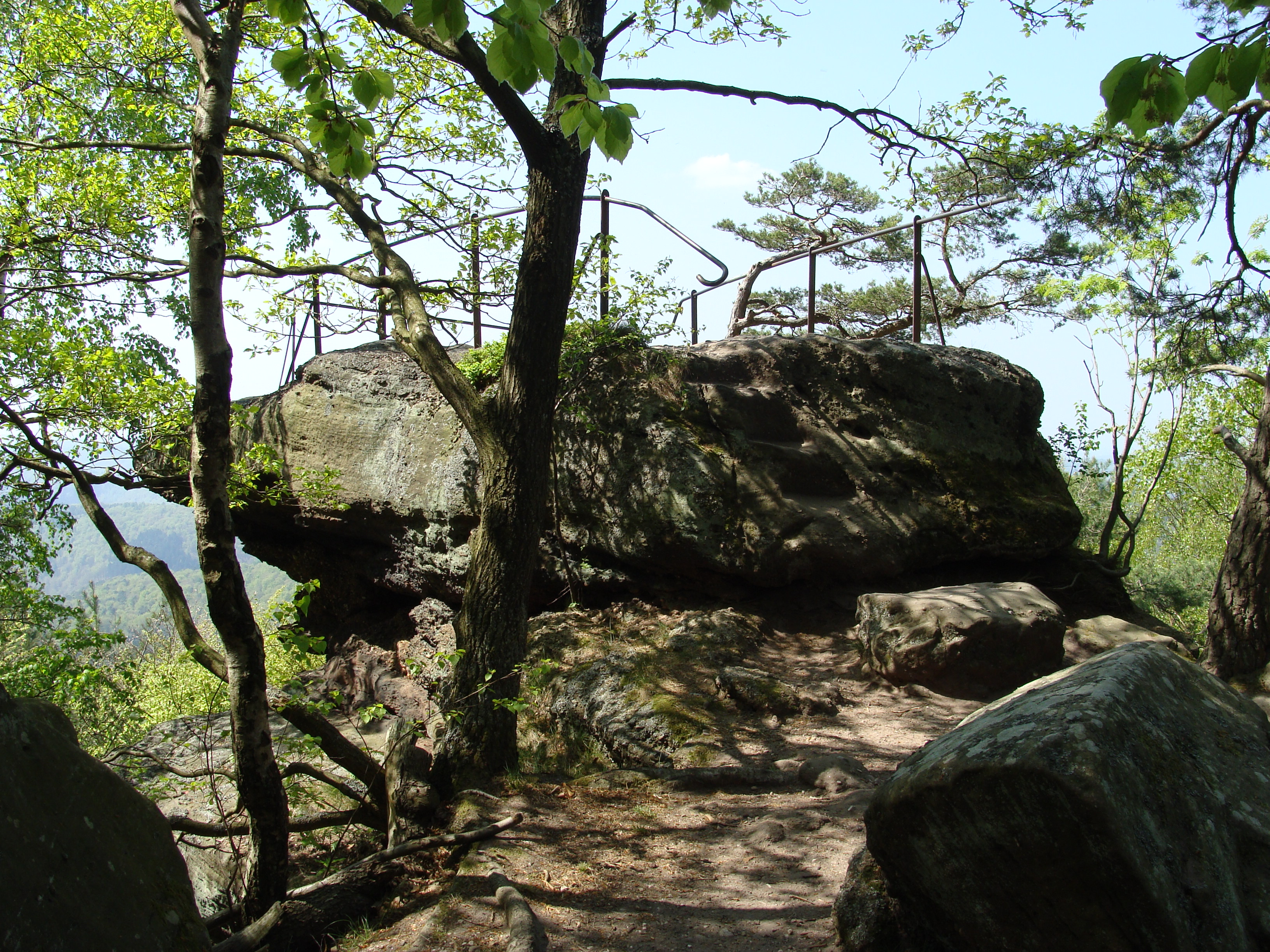
The Westfelsen ("West Rocks")

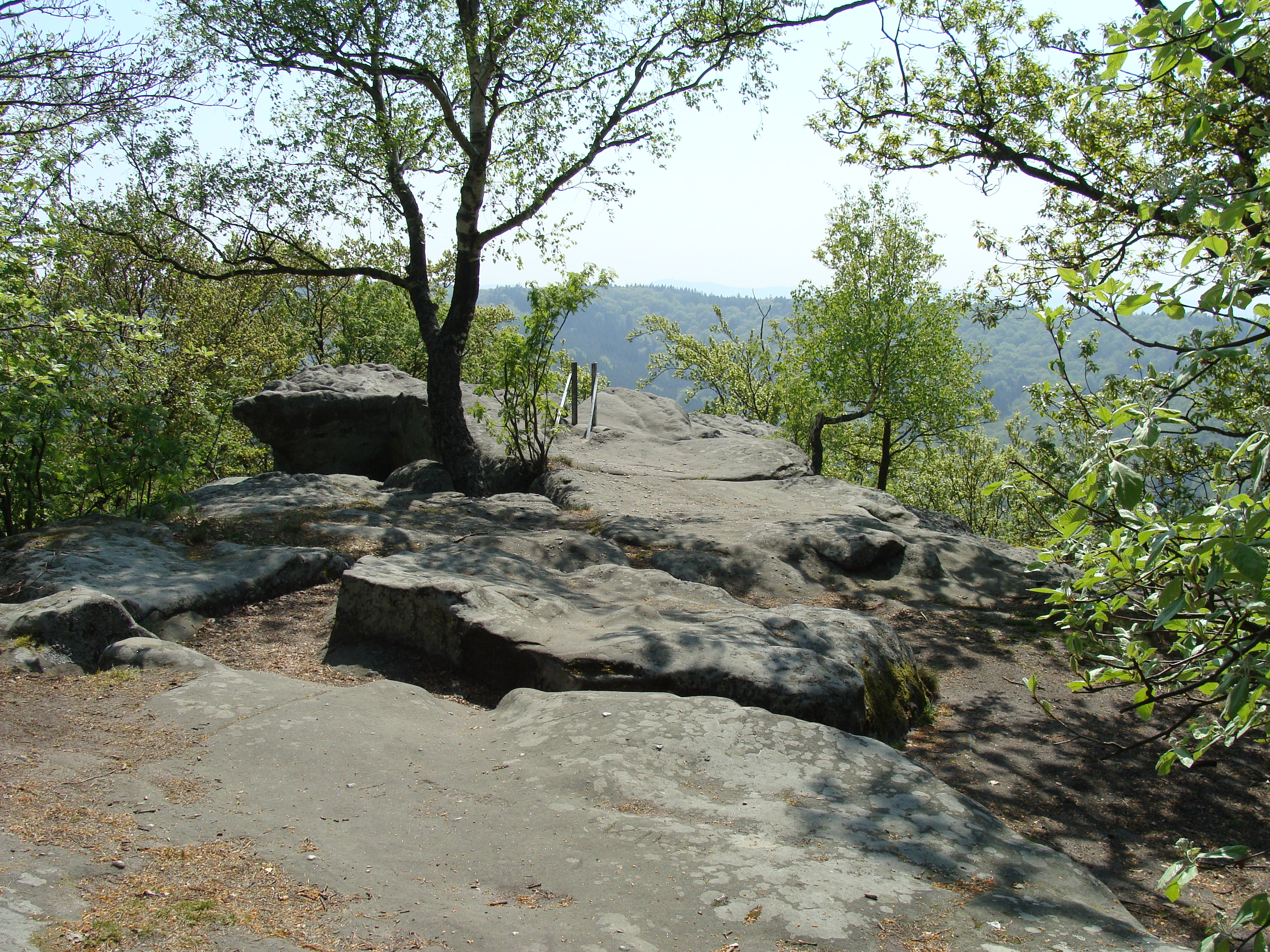
The Südfelsen ("South Rocks")

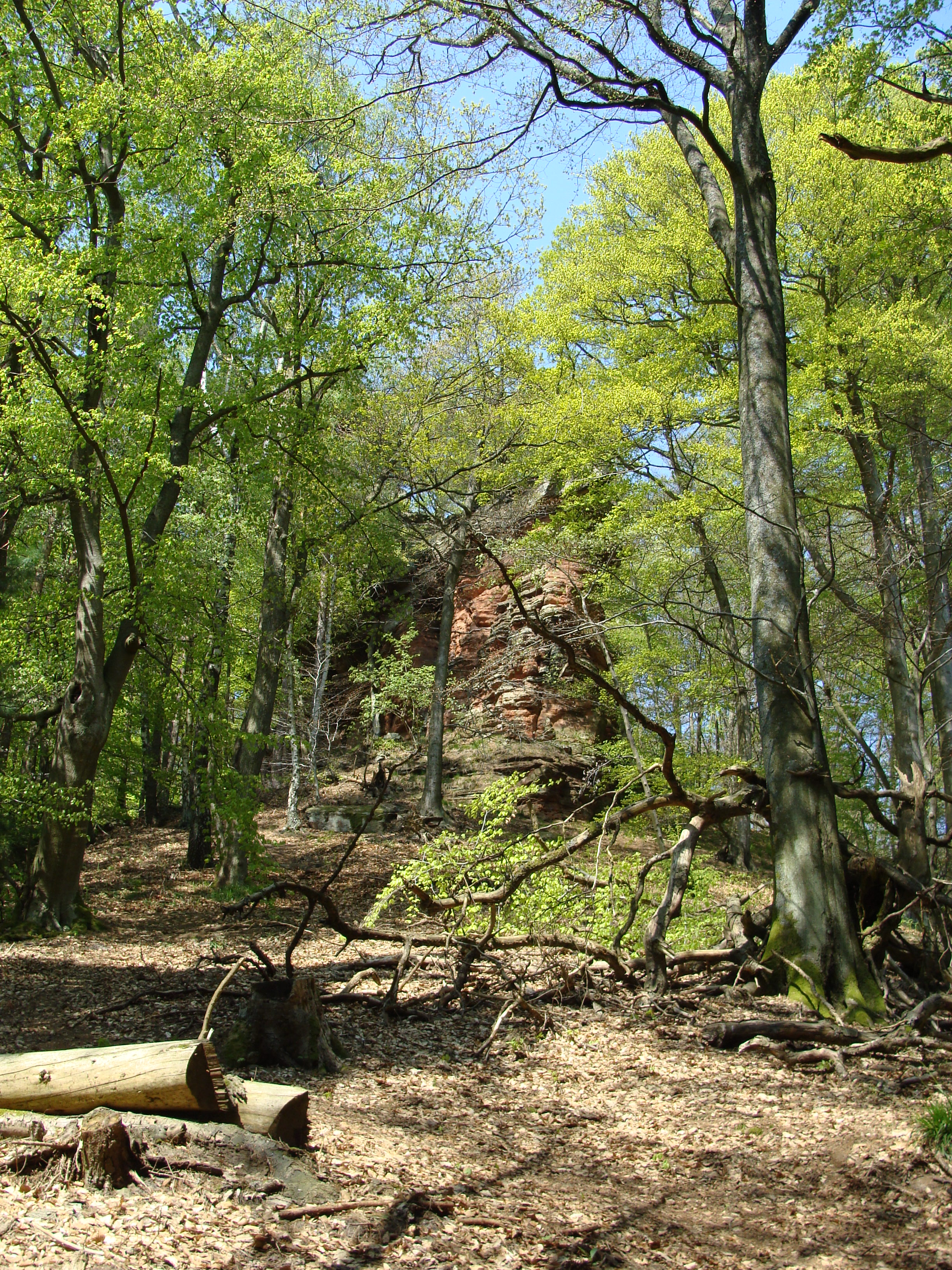
Sandstone massif on the Südfelsen

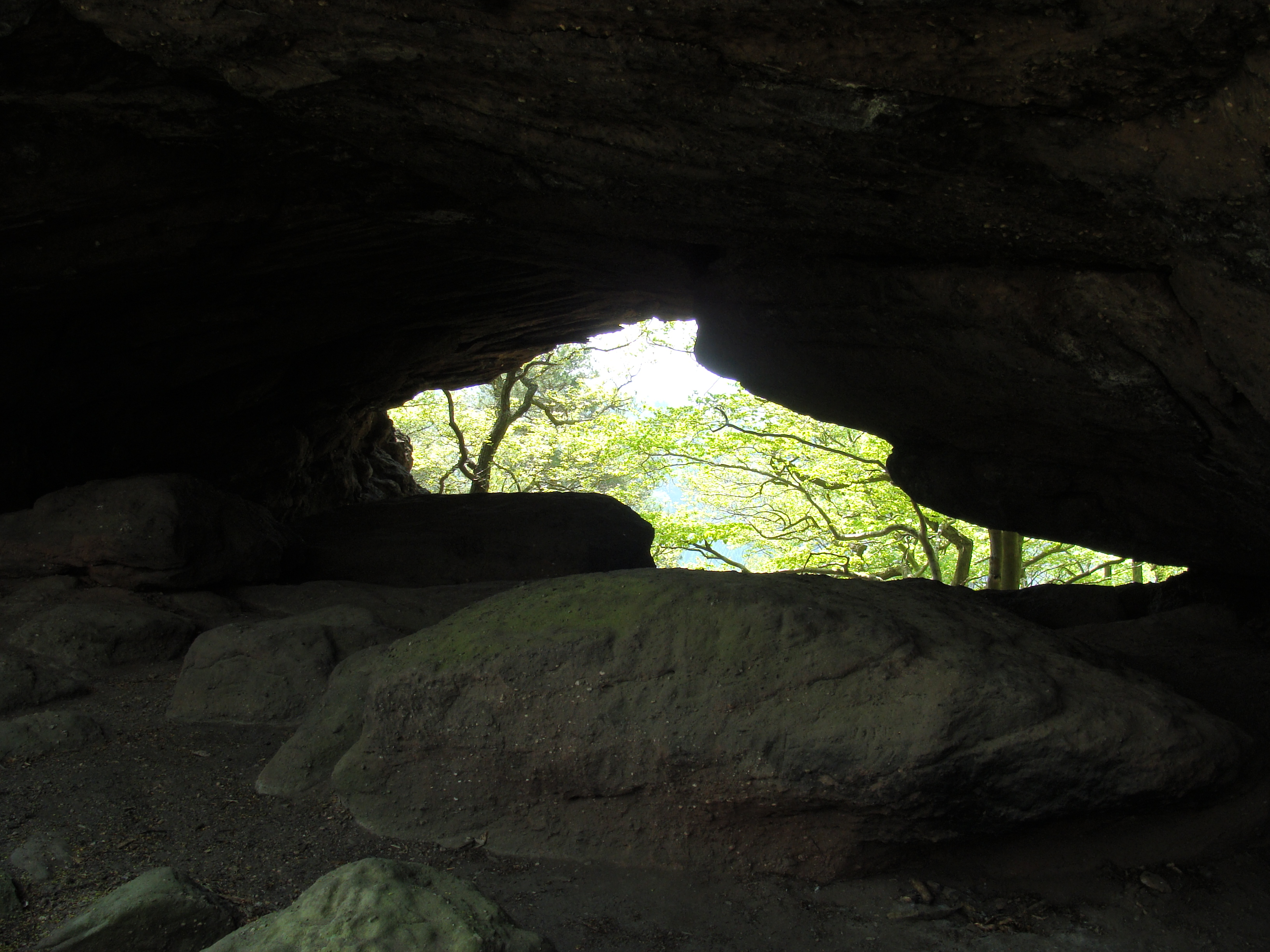
Arch below the Südfelsen

== Tourism ==
=== Transport ===
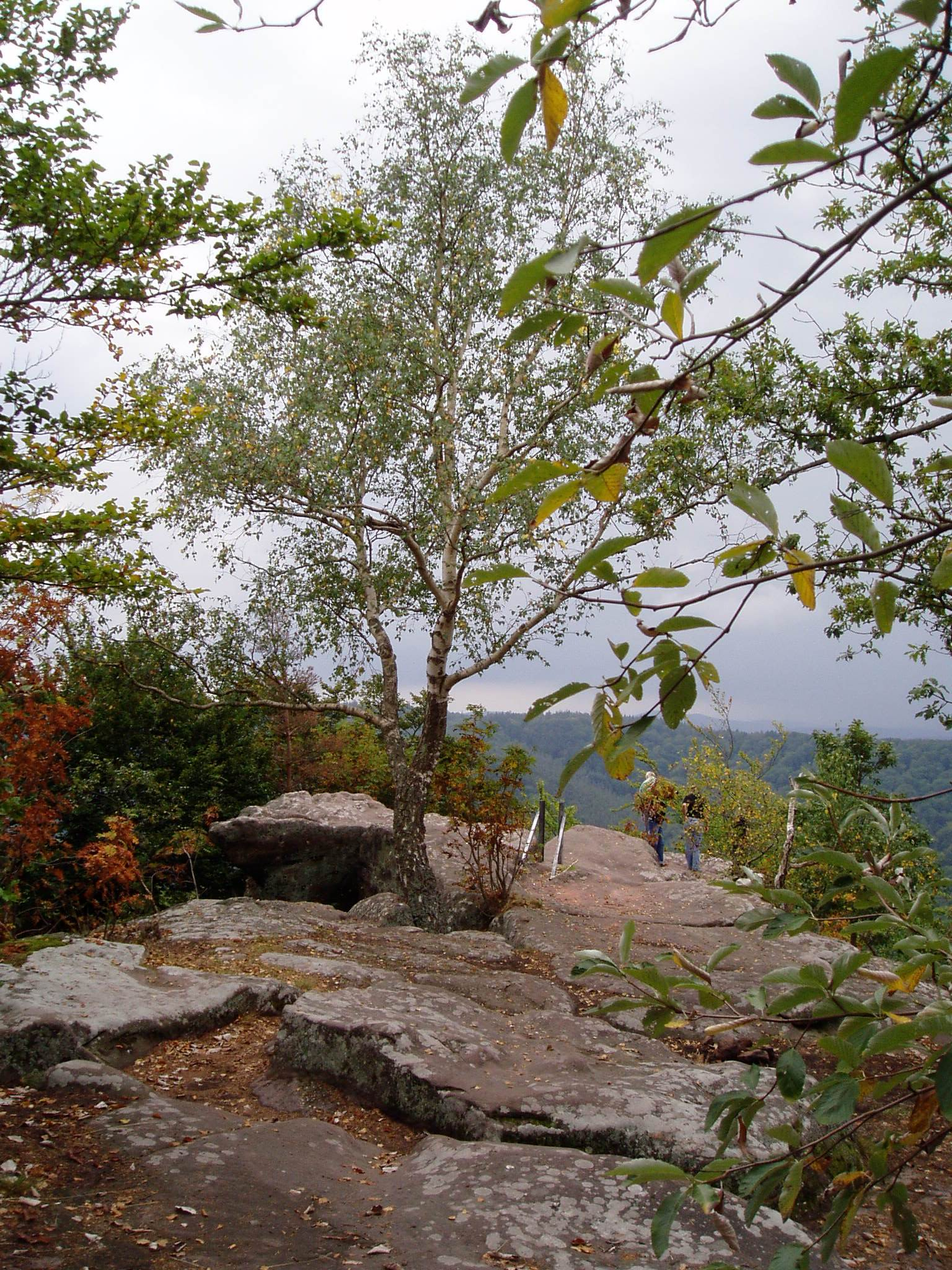
Hiking trail on the Drachenfels (2005)

Due to its central location Drachenfels accessible from all sides, albeit only on foot because the area is protected. Mountain bikes or other wheeled vehicles are not allowed. The ascent is very steep and runs over woodland tracks and paths that are unsurfaced in places. The nearest hiker's car park, Forsthaus Saupferch, where there is a trail map erected by the Palatine Forest Club, may be reached from the north – from the B 37 Kaiserslautern to Bad Dürkheim road – over a roughly 2 kilometre-long, metalled road.

=== Maintenance ===
The Drachenfels area is maintained by the Drachenfels Club. The club, whose aim is the preservation and care of heritage sites in and around Bad Dürkheim, was founded in 1873 and opened up the Drachenfels to visitors that same year.
