= Schaudichnichtum Lodge =

Castle in Germany

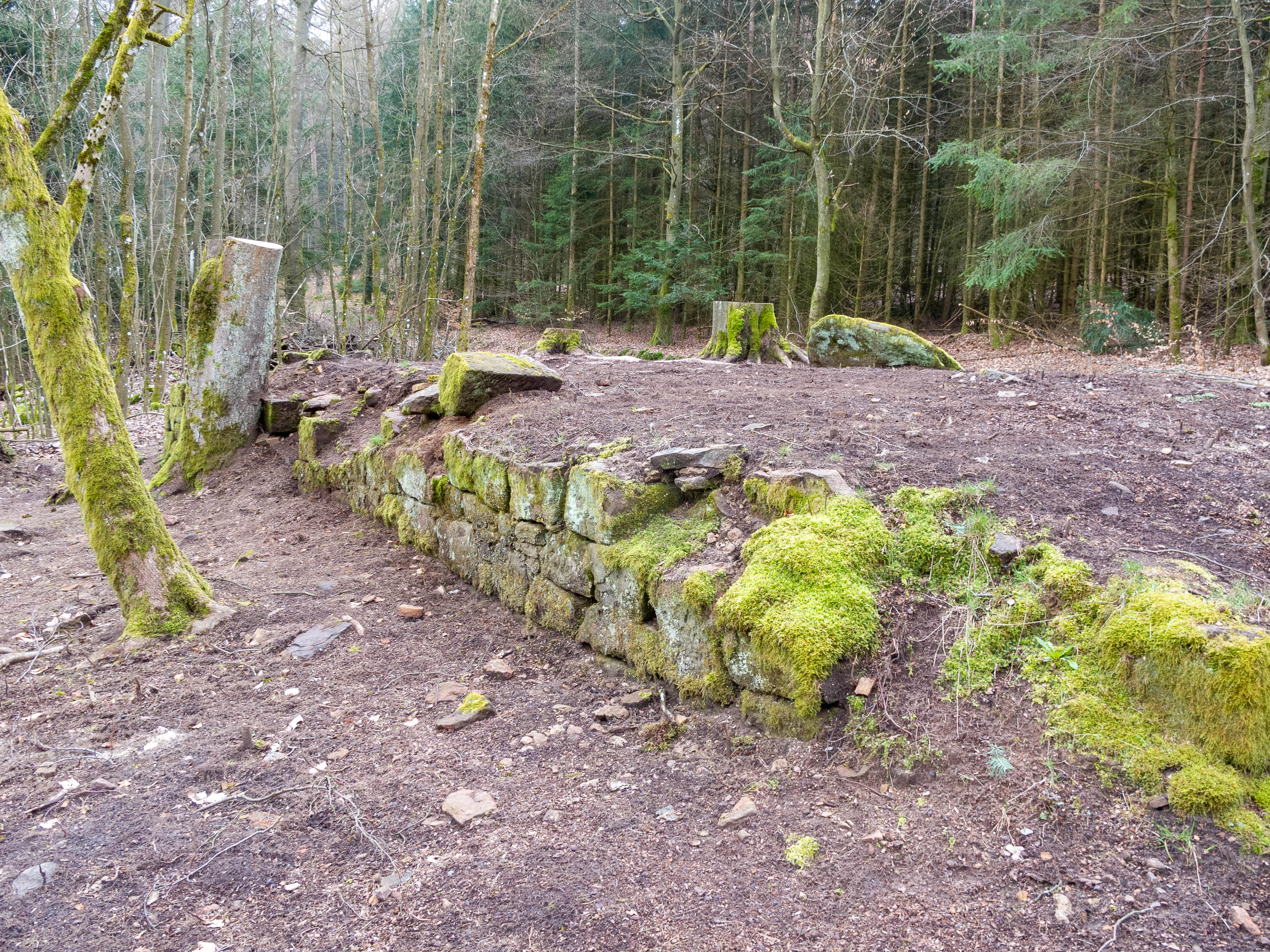
Remains of Schaudichnichtum hunting lodge

Schaudichnichtum Lodge (German: Schloss Schaudichnichtum) was a former hunting lodge southwest of the town of Bad Dürkheim in the German state of Rhineland-Palatinate. Like its near neighbours, Kehrdichannichts, Murrmirnichtviel and Jägerthal, it was used as accommodation for the nobility of the Electoral Palatinate during the 18th century when they went hunting in the Palatine Forest.

Today the hunting lodge is a ruin; all that remains are a few foundation wall remnants, outlines in the terrain and a monument.

== History ==
The hunting lodge was probably built in 1730 by the lords of Hallberg from Fußgönheim, who had leased the local hunting grounds from the prince-electors. It was probably destroyed in 1793, when the French Revolution spilled over into the present day region of Palatinate.

The original name of the hunting lodge is unknown. The local population re-christened the ruins in the 19th century taking their theme from the names of the nearby lodges of Kehrdichannichts and Murrmirnichtviel, resulting in it being called "Schaudichnichtum", meaning "do not look round".

In 1963 the lodge, which had been managed since 1816 by the old royal Bavarian forestry commission, was transferred to the Rhineland-Palatinate State Castle Authority.

== Literature ==
- Magnus Backes, Heinz Straeter: Staatliche Burgen, Schlösser und Altertümer in Rheinland-Pfalz. Schnell & Steiner, Regensburg, 2003, ISBN 3-7954-1566-7.
- Walter Eitelmann: Rittersteine im Pfälzerwald. 4. Auflage. Pfälzerwald-Verein, Neustadt/Weinstraße, 1998, ISBN 3-00-003544-3.
- Günter Stein: Burgen und Schlösser in der Pfalz. Weidlich, Frankfurt/Main, 1976, ISBN 3-8035-8356-X.

49°25′39.41″N 8°5′4.97″E
