= Drachenfels =

Drachenfels (German: dragon's rock) is the name of

Hills:

- Drachenfels (Siebengebirge), a hill on the Rhine between Königswinter and Bad Honnef, North Rhine-Westphalia
- Drachenfels (Central Palatinate Forest), hill and Roman fortification in the north of the Palatinate Forest, Rhineland-Palatinate

Castle ruins:

- Drachenfels Castle (Siebengebirge), on the Rhine between Königswinter and Bad Honnef, North Rhine-Westphalia
- Drachenfels Castle (Wasgau), near Busenberg im Wasgau in the south of the Palatinate Forest, Rhineland-Palatinate

People:

- Gottfried von Drachenfels (Siebengebirge) (died 1273), Viscount of Castle Drachenfels on the Rhine
- Rudolf von Drachenfels (1582–1656), German civil servant and occasional poet

Fiction:

- Drachenfels (1989), a vampire novel by Kim Newman, originally published under his pen name Jack Yeovil
