= Giant Cask =

Coordinates: 49°27′53″N 08°10′09″E

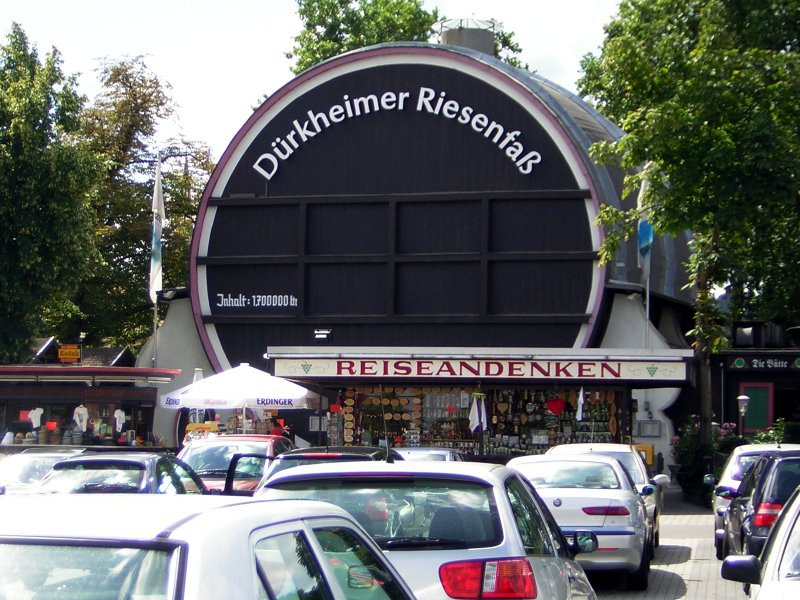
The Giant Cask of Dürkheim

The Giant Cask or Giant Barrel (German: Riesenfass, locally just Fass or, in the local Palatine dialect, the Därgemer Fass), is a tourist attraction in the Palatine spa and district town of Bad Dürkheim in the state of Rhineland-Palatinate. The wine barrel has a diameter of 13.5 metres, a volume of about 1,700,000 litres or 1,700 m³ and is thus the largest cask in the world. However, it is not used for the storage of wine, but houses a restaurant.

== Location ==
The Giant Cask on St.-Michaels-Allee 1 is northeast of the old town in the water meadows of the Isenach stream on the western edge of the 45,000 m^{2} Brühlwiesen meadows. Every year on the second and third week in September the Dürkheim Wurstmarkt (lit.: "sausage market") takes place on these fields. The Wurstmarkt is the biggest wine festival in the world, playing host to over 600,000 visitors. Access to the Weinfass and the Wurstmarkt is from the B 37 federal highway (Ludwigshafen am Rhein–Kaiserslautern) just to the north.

== History ==
The barrel was built in 1934 by Bad Dürkheim vineyard owner and master cooper, Fritz Keller, using wood to fashion it into the standard shape using traditional methods, albeit oversized. To construct the cask nearly 200 spruce trees were felled in the Northern Black Forest, all about 40 metres high. One tree was needed for each of the 178 staves, each 15 metres long and 15 cm thick. In all, more than 200 m³ of wood was used.

With the completion of the Giant Cask in Dürkheim, it superseded by a long way the famous Heidelberg Tun which, with a length of 9 metres, a diameter of 7 metres and capacity of 221,726 litres, and was actually used to store wine, had previously been the largest cask in the world.

== Description ==
The giant Dürkheim barrel bears the inscription Dürkheimer Riesenfaß in the old German script on the bottom of the barrel which faces east. The interior is a type of wine bar. It can take just under 430 guests on two levels (ground floor and gallery). Because of the number of visitors, in 1958 the wooden "tub" (Bütt) was added. This is an oversized tub, constructed in the same style as the Riesenfass and has space for about 120 guests. The bar is operated for most of the year in the Bütt; the barrel itself is only accessible to guests during the Wurstmarkt and for large groups by prior arrangement.

== Pictures ==
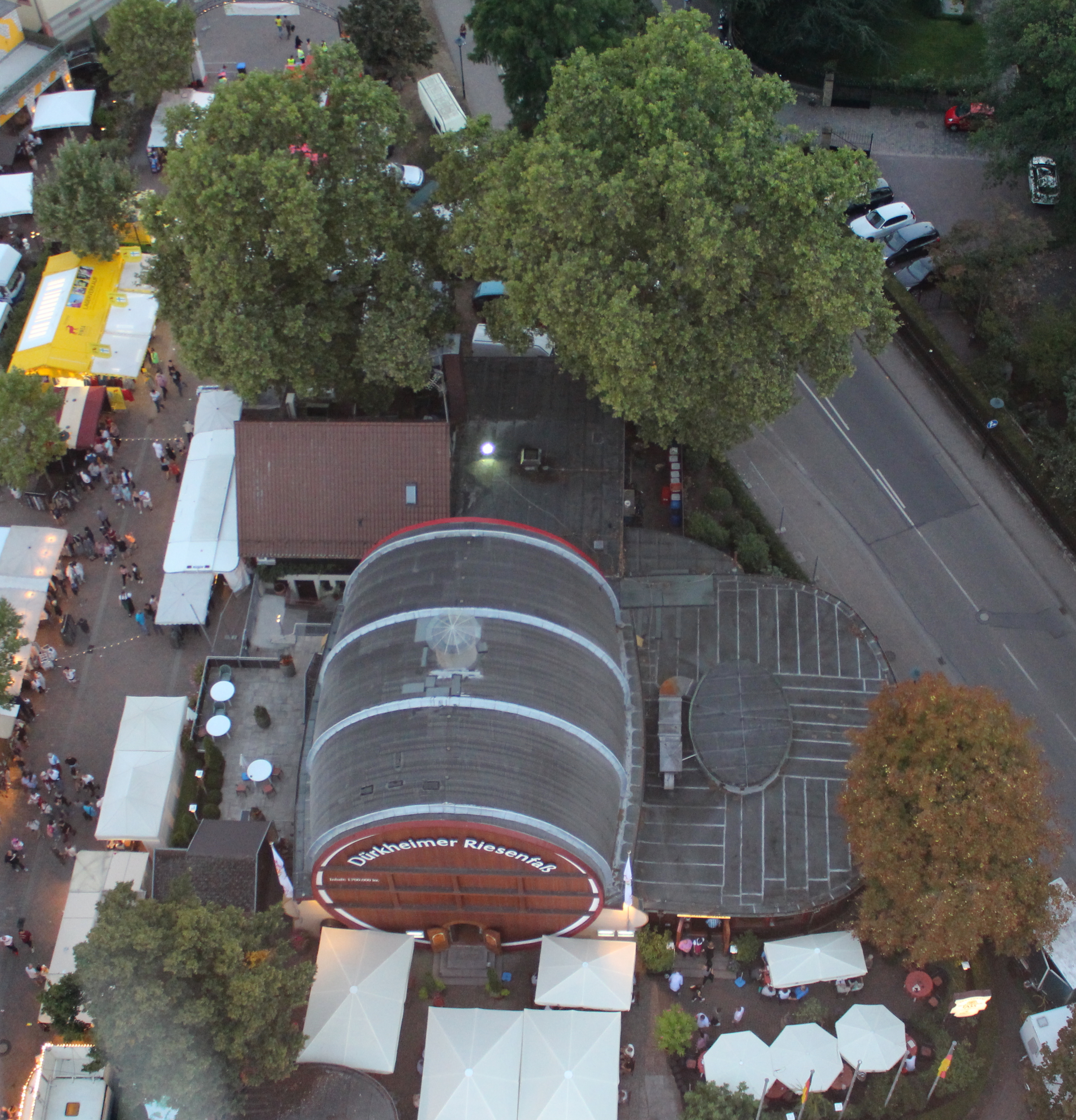
Photographed from transportable observation tower "City Skyliner" on Wurstmarkt 2016

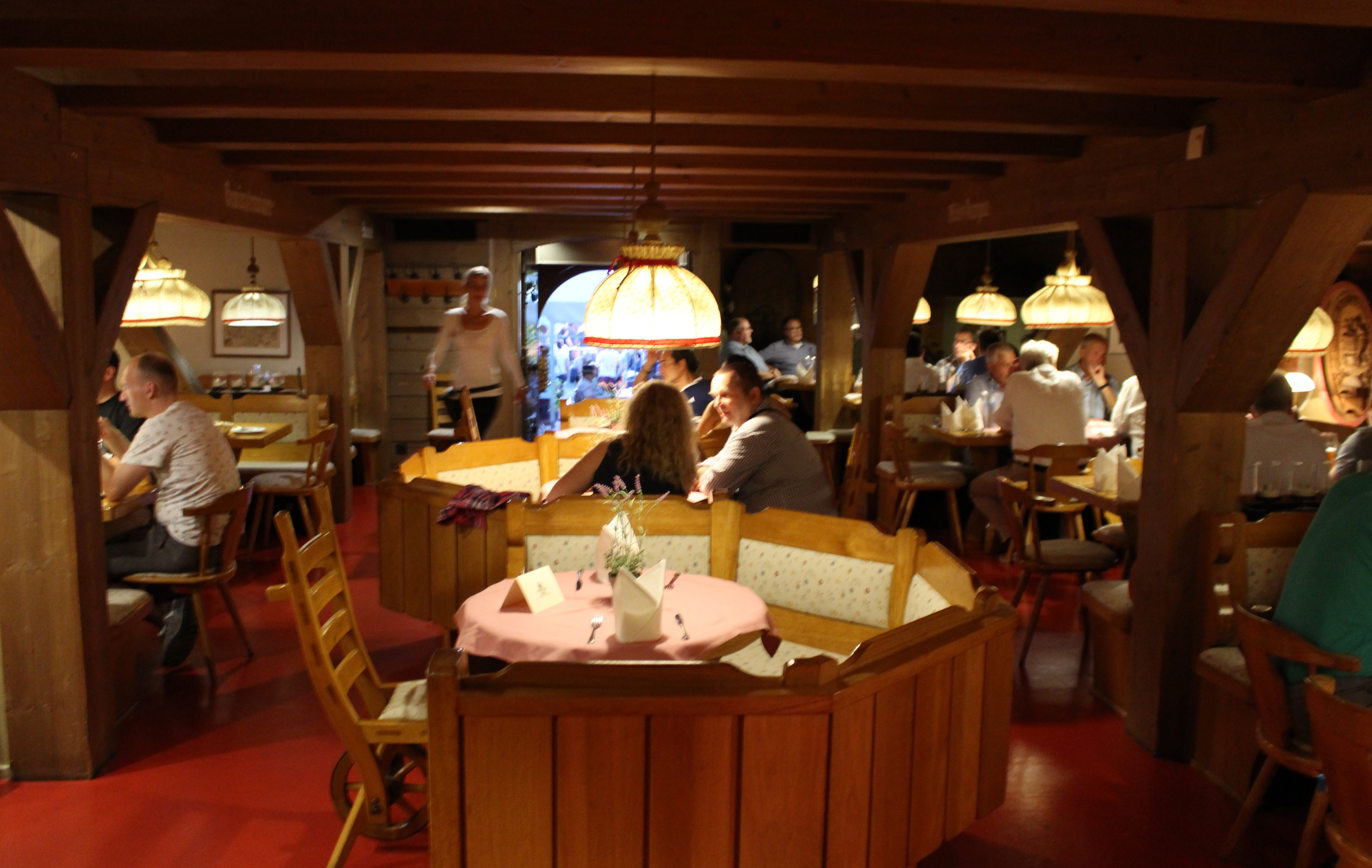
Inn in lower floor

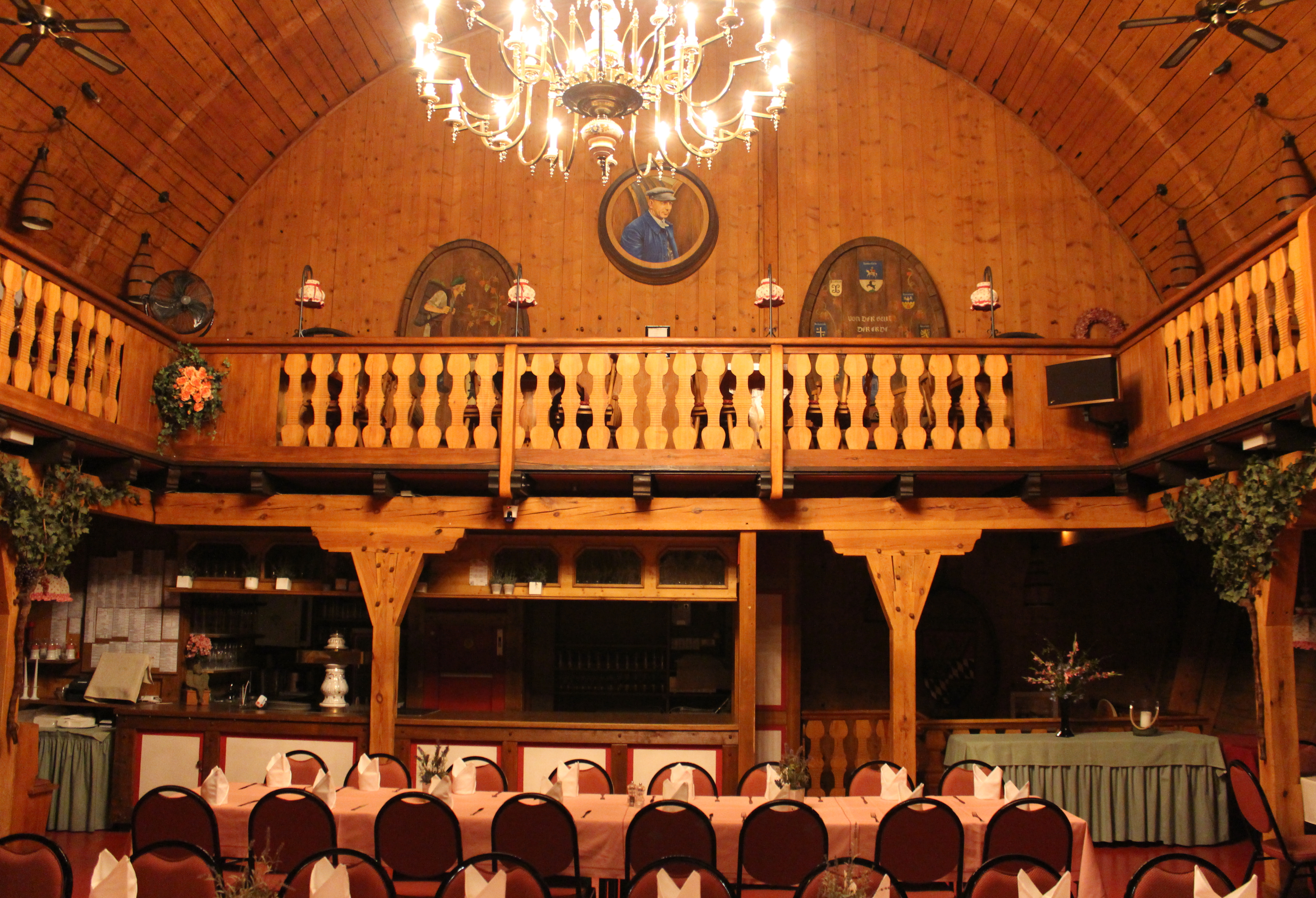
Upper floor

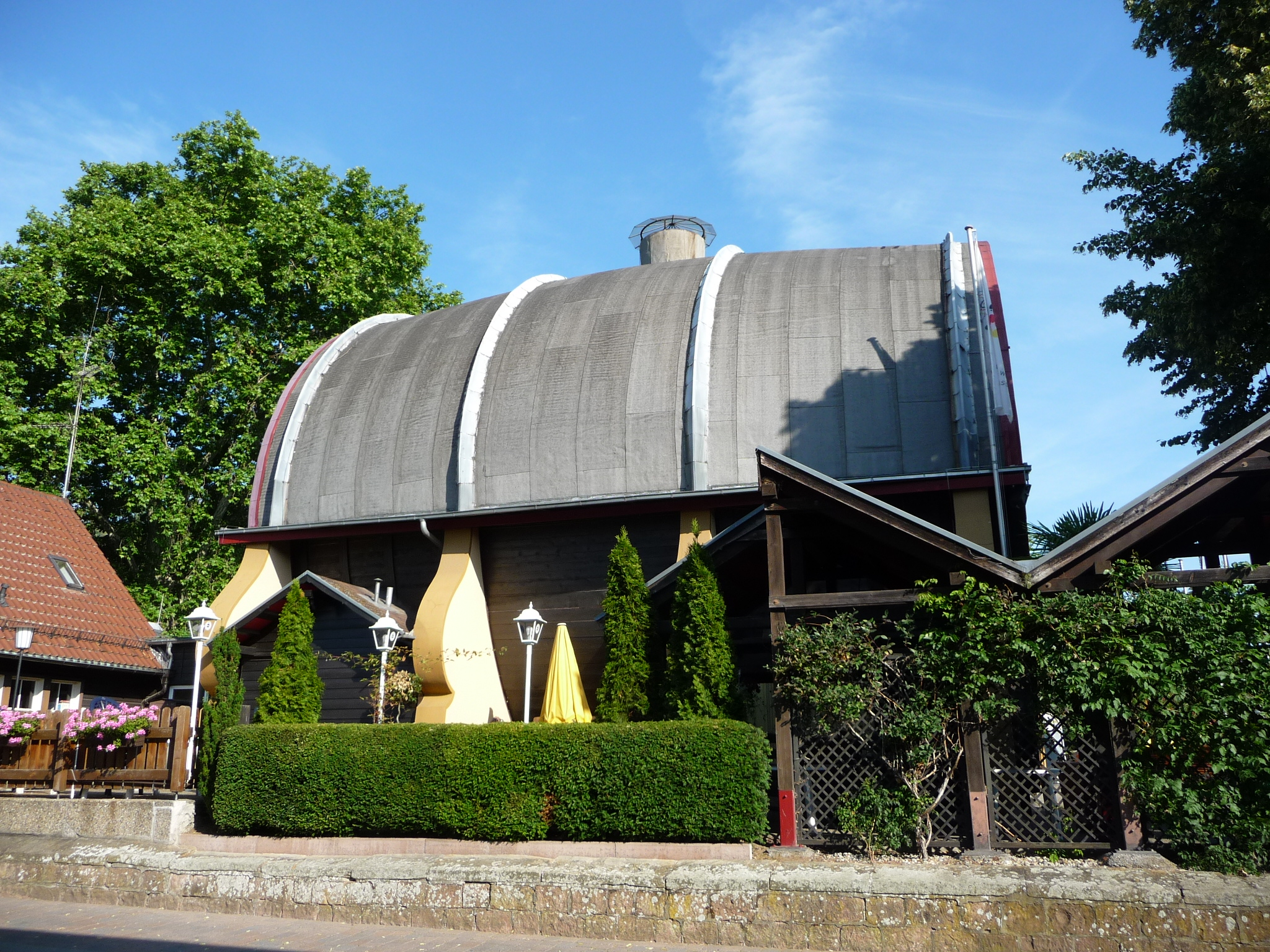
Side view

== Literature ==
- Doris Aust (2009-08-15), "Ein "Spleen" wird zur Sensation", Die Rheinpfalz, Bad Dürkheimer Zeitung (in German), no. 182, Ludwigshafen, "Thema am Samstag: Das Dürkheimer Fass feiert 75. Geburtstag"
- Theo Becker (1995), "Das Dürkheimer Faß : Wahrzeichen der Weinstraße", Stimme der Pfalz (in German), vol. 46, no. 3, pp. 17–18
- Eva Klag-Ritz (1994-11-26), ""Fritz, hör auf, du machst dich bankrott" : Die Geschichte und Geschichten um den Bau des Dürkheimer Fasses", Die Rheinpfalz, Bad Dürkheimer Zeitung (in German), no. 274, Ludwigshafen
- Sven Wenzel (2009-08-15), "Dauerhaftigkeit – außen und innen : Seit 75 Jahren kommt in Bad Dürkheim kaum ein Besucher am "Fass" vorbei", Die Rheinpfalz, Bad Dürkheimer Zeitung (in German), no. 182, Ludwigshafen, "Thema am Samstag: Das Dürkheimer Fass feiert 75. Geburtstag"
