= Andreas Keith =

German politician (born 1967)

Member of the Landtag of North Rhine-Westphalia
- Incumbent
- Assumed office 1 June 2017

Personal details
- Born: 10 June 1967 (age 58) Bad Dürkheim
- Party: Alternative for Germany (since 2013)

Andreas Keith (born 10 June 1967 in Bad Dürkheim) is a German politician serving as a member of the Landtag of North Rhine-Westphalia since 2017. From 2017 to 2024, served as chief whip of the Alternative for Germany.
