= Wurstmarkt =

German wine festival

Coordinates: 49°27′57.79″N 8°10′15.33″E

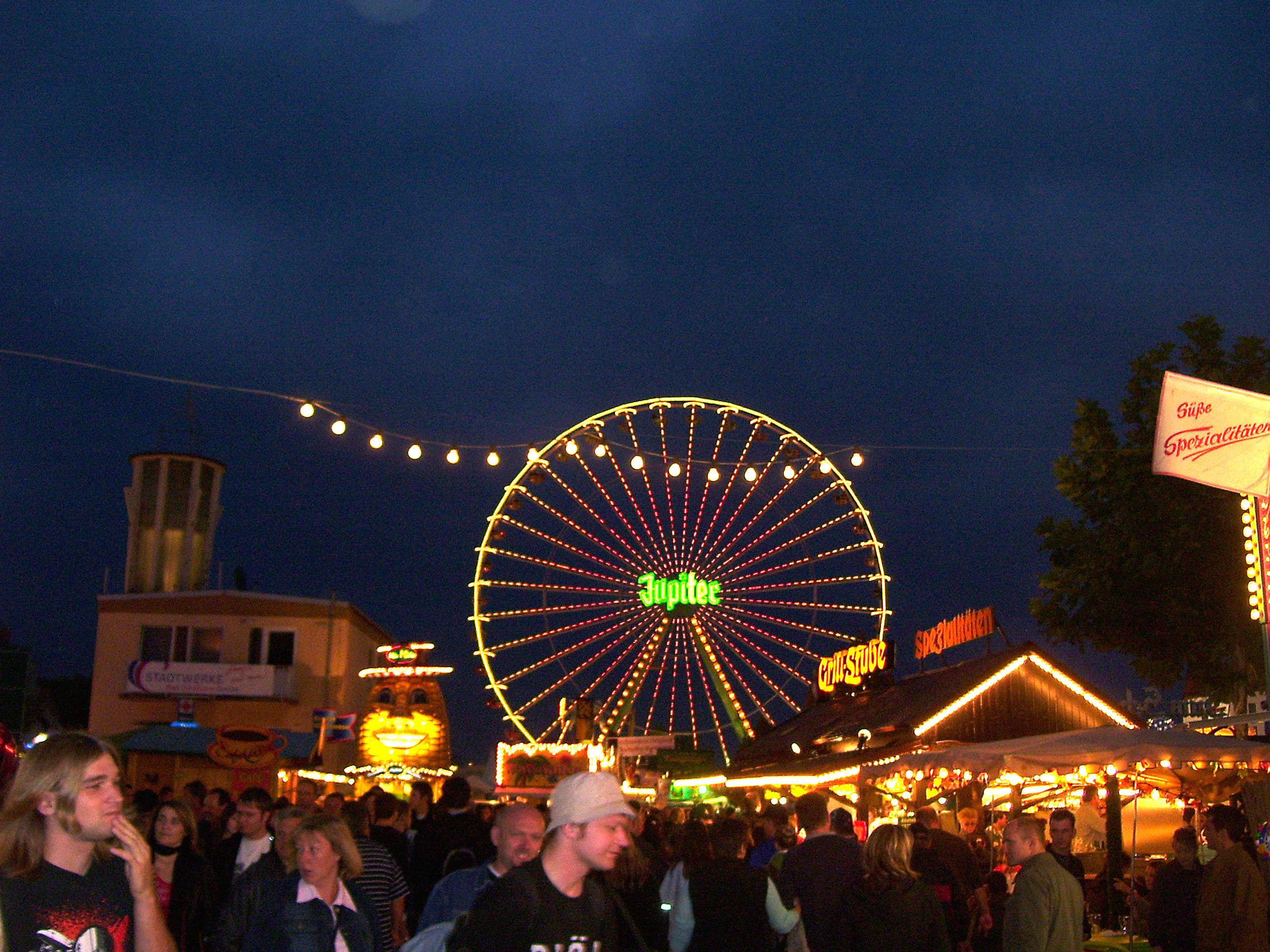
Wurstmarkt 2007

The Wurstmarkt (literally: Sausage market) in the spa town of Bad Dürkheim, in Rhineland-Palatinate, Germany is the world's biggest wine festival with over 600,000 visitors each year. It is held annually on the second and third weekend of September. The first Wurstmarkt - under a different name - was held in the year 1417. It takes place in the middle of the town, outside the Giant Cask (Dürkheimer Riesenfass) - the largest wine barrel in the world, which also houses a restaurant. The festival is reminiscent of the common Weihnachtsmarkt, with fairground rides and many food stalls being temporarily installed for the event. They eat all kinds of sausages at the “Wurstmar including Bratwurst.

Wurstmarkt went on virtually in 2020–21, but went on hiatus in 1915-18 & 1940–45.
