= Hartmut Hofrichter =

German architect and historic preservationist

Hartmut Hofrichter (born 3 May 1939) is a German architect, architecture historian, historic preservationist and academic teacher.

== Life ==
Born in Stettin, Hofrichter studied architecture from 1961 to 1966 at the RWTH Aachen. In 1971, he promovierte to the doctorate at this university with Willy Weyres and Lorenz Dittmann with the thesis Das Kloster Sdepannos Nachawega in der iranischen Provinz Azerbaijan. From 1971 until his habilitation in 1978, he worked with Martin Graßnick as an assistant professor in the Department of Architectural History, History of Urban Development and Preservation of Monuments. In 1980, he was appointed State Conservator of Rhineland-Palatinate in succession to Werner Bornheim gen. Schilling. In 1982, he was appointed professor at the Department of Architecture/Spatial and Environmental Planning/Civil Engineering (A/RU/BI) at the Technical University of Kaiserslautern in succession to Martin Graßnick. From 1995 to 1997, he was dean of this department and from 1997 to 2001 he held the office of Vice President of the University of Kaiserslautern. He retired in 2004.

== Publications ==
- Das Kloster Sdepannos Nachawega in der iranischen Provinz Aserbaidschan. Diss. an der RWTH Aachen, Aachen 1971
- (with Martin Graßnick): Die Architektur der Antike. Materialien zur Baugeschichte vol. 1, Braunschweig 1982 ISBN 3-528-08681-5
- (with Martin Graßnick): Die Architektur des Mittelalters. Materialien zur Baugeschichte vol. 2, Braunschweig 1982 ISBN 3-528-08682-3
- (with Martin Graßnick): Die Architektur der Neuzeit. Materialien zur Baugeschichte vol. 3, Braunschweig 1982 ISBN 3-528-08683-1
- (with Martin Graßnick): Stadtbaugeschichte von der Antike bis zur Neuzeit. Materialien zur Baugeschichte vol. 4, Braunschweig 1982
- Steinerne Kirchturmbekrönungen in der ehemaligen Diözese Worms, Eltville am Rhein 1984
- (with Martin Graßnick): Deutsche historische Bürgerhäuser, Keysers kleine Kulturgeschichte, Munich 1985 ISBN 3-87405-168-4
- (ed.): Putz und Farbigkeit an mittelalterlichen Bauten, Stuttgart 1993 ISBN 3-8062-1069-1.
- (ed.): Die Burg, ein kulturgeschichtliches Phänomen, Stuttgart 1994 ISBN 3-8062-1134-5.
- (ed. with Barbara Schock-Werner): Burg- und Schlosskapellen: Kolloquium des Wissenschaftlichen Beirats der Deutschen Burgenvereinigung, Stuttgart 1995 ISBN 3-8062-1188-4.
- (ed. gemeinsam mit Barbara Schock-Werner und Klaus Bingenheimer): Fenster und Türen in historischen Wehr- und Wohnbauten: Kolloquium des Wissenschaftlichen Beirats der Deutschen Burgenvereinigung, Stuttgart 1995 ISBN 3-8062-1224-4
- Burgenbau im späten Mittelalter, Munich 1996 ISBN 3-422-06187-8.
- (ed.): Der andere Martin Graßnick. Festschrift aus Anlaß der Vollendung seines achtzigsten Geburtstages, Kaiserslautern 1997
- (ed. with Georg Ulrich Großmann): Der frühe Schloßbau und seine Mittelalterlichen Vorstufen, Munich 1997 ISBN 3-422-06208-4
- (ed.): Beiträge zur armenischen Baugeschichte,, Kaiserslautern 2001 ISBN 3-935627-00-9
- (ed.): Materialien zur Vorlesung Geschichte der Architekturtheorie, Kaiserslautern 2002 ISBN 3-935627-10-6
- Visionen, Kaiserslautern 2002
- (ed. with Joachim Zeune, Roland Paul and Burghart Schmidt): Historische Häuser in den ländlichen Regionen der Pfalz, Kaiserslautern 2005 ISBN 978-3-927754-53-9.
- (ed. with Joachim Zeune): Alltag auf Burgen im Mittelalter, Braubach 2006 ISBN 978-3-927558-25-0
- (ed. with Joachim Zeune): Die Burg im 15. Jahrhundert: Kolloquium des Wissenschaftlichen Beirats der Deutschen Burgenvereinigung, Braubach 2011 ISBN 978-3-927558-32-8
