= Weilerskopf =

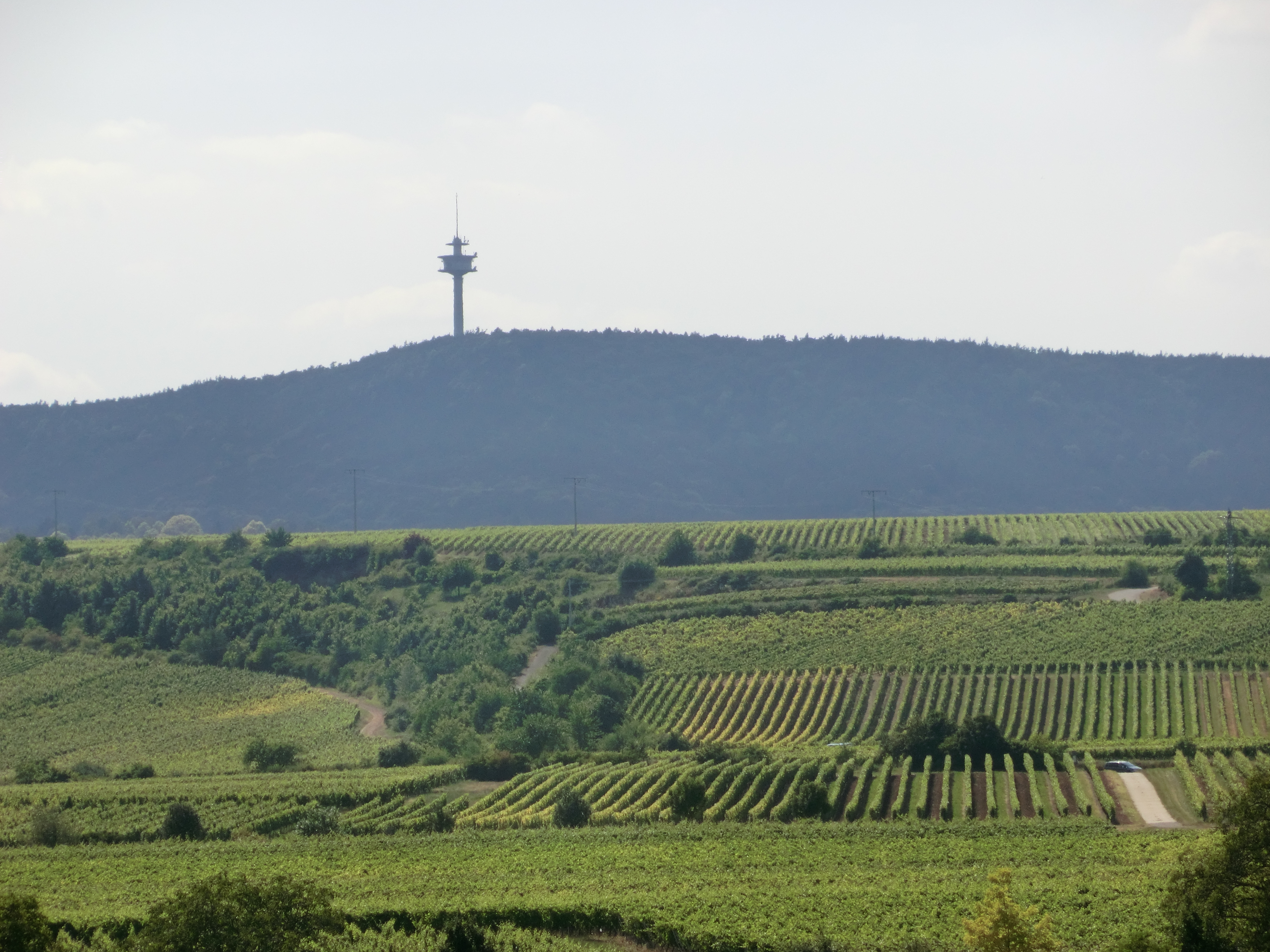

Highest point
- Elevation: 470 m above sea level (NN) (1,540 ft)
- Coordinates: 49°29′26″N 8°07′31″E

Geography
- Location within Rhineland-Palatinate
- Location: Palatine Forest, Rhineland-Palatinate, Germany
- Parent range: Haardt

The Weilerskopf is a hill, 470 metres high, in a wooded exclave of Herxheim am Berg northwest of the German town of Bad Dürkheim. Its summit is the site of a transmission tower owned by Deutsche Telekom.

== Transmission tower ==
The Weilerskopf transmission tower is a standard telecommunications tower, or Typenturm, built in 1969.

== Gebetsfelsen ==
The Gebetsfelsen is a rock formation on the Weilerskopf. It is a 7-metre-long, 4-metre-wide and only 1.4-metre-high monolith made of sandstone. Twelve steps have been cut into the sandstone, probably in Roman times. A Roman quarry is located in the vicinity of the Gebetsfelsen.
