= Christian Henel =

German footballer

Personal information
- Date of birth: 28 January 1988 (age 38)
- Place of birth: Bad Dürkheim, West Germany
- Height: 1.91 m (6 ft 3 in)
- Position: Forward

Youth career
- 2001–2003: SV 1911 Bad Dürkheim
- 2003–2006: 1. FC Kaiserslautern

Senior career*
Years	Team	Apps	(Gls)
2006–2010	1. FC Kaiserslautern II	55	(10)
2007	1. FC Kaiserslautern	2	(0)
2010–2011	Darmstadt 98	19	(0)
2011–2012	Wormatia Worms	20	(1)
2012–2014	KSV Hessen Kassel	43	(12)
2014	FK Pirmasens	6	(1)
2017	TuS Mechtersheim	2	(0)
Total		147	(24)

International career
2007	Germany U18	5	(0)
- * Club domestic league appearances and goals

Christian Henel (born 28 January 1988) is a German former professional footballer who played as a forward.

== Career ==
Henel was born in Bad Dürkheim, West Germany. At the age of 15, he left his hometown Bad Dürkheim where he played for SV 1911 Bad Dürkheim to go to 1. FC Kaiserslautern which played in the Bundesliga. After three years in the youth ranks of the club he became the opportunity to play with the second team in the Regionalliga Süd while the first team had to join the 2. Bundesliga. Although the second squad of FCK had no chance to stay in the 3. Liga, Henel had an important role in the team and could score eight times in 29 games. From summer 2007, he was part of the first team and played twice in the 2. Bundesliga.

In summer 2010, he joined SV Darmstadt 98.
