= Kehrdichannichts Lodge =

Castle in Germany

Coordinates: 49°26′31.5″N 8°5′19.82″E

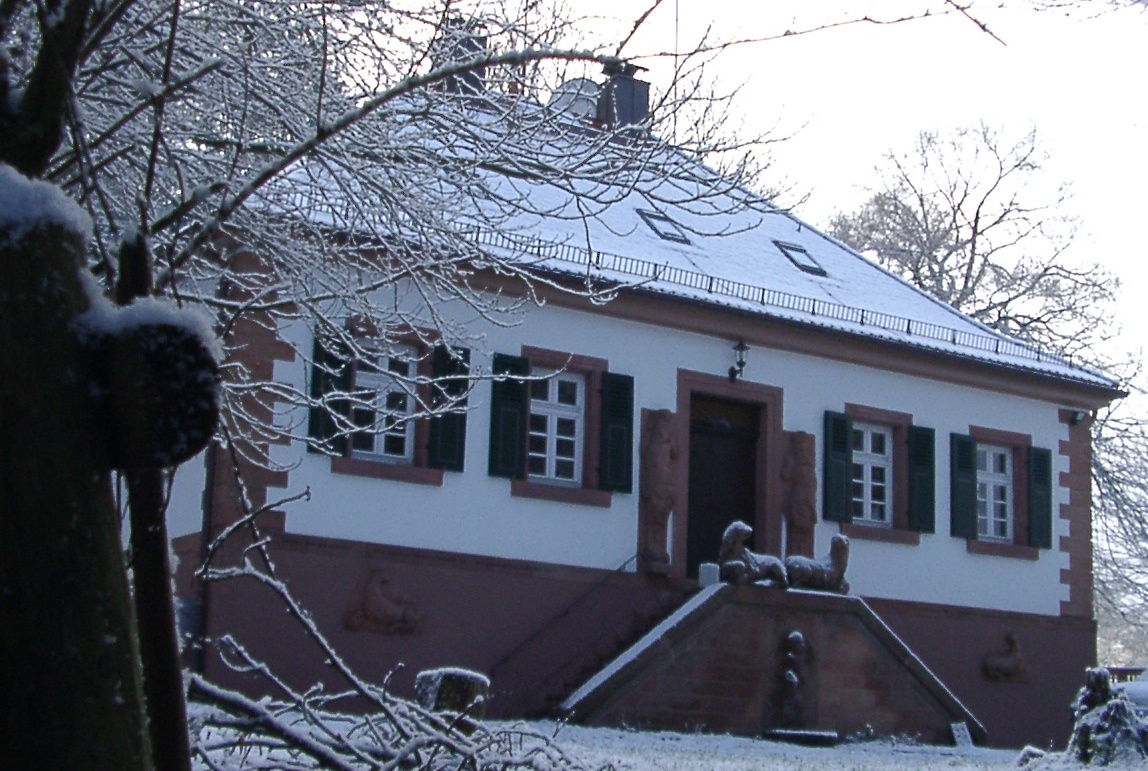
The Jagdschloss Kehrdichannichts

Kehrdichannichts Lodge (German: Schloss Kehrdichannichts or Kehr-dich-an-nichts) is a former hunting lodge in the Palatine Forest west of Bad Dürkheim in the German state of Rhineland-Palatinate. It belonged to the Leiningen counts.

== History ==
In 1588 deer enclosures were already being recorded in the wooded region near Bad Dürkheim. At the same spot on which the hunting lodge stands there was probably an older, simpler building which acted as a base for the nobility during a hunt and probably did not survive the War of the Palatine Succession.

The plateau on which the lodge stands today was first mentioned under the name Kehrdichannichts in 1651 and this name was later adopted by the schloss.

In 1707 Count John Frederick of Leiningen had a new wooden hunting hut built. It was in response to the hunting reserve established in the immediate vicinity by Electoral Palatinate; they wanted to monitor their neighbours in the region and make the boundaries clear.

In 1717 work began on a hunting lodge. Count John Frederick died in February 1722 and did not survive to see it completed. His son, Count Frederick Magnus had the lodge finished in 1722. His relief still decorates one of the stone walls. Kehrdichannichts Lodge was used by the count as a hunting residence until he died in 1756. His successor, Prince Charles Frederick William, was the next owner. Following the seizure of the Palatinate during the French Revolution, the hunting lodge appears to have been razed in 1793.

The once two-storey building was converted in 1816 to a single storey under Bavarian rule and was used until 1891 as a forester's lodge. It was then to be demolished, but the plan was prevented by a private initiative. Instead it was sold to the vineyard owner, Kommerzienrat Fritz Eckel from Deidesheim. The state re-acquired the house in 1917, but continued to lease it to Eckel's nephews.

Since 1927, Kehrdichannichts has once again been a forester's lodge; until the end of the 20th century it housed a restaurant. The lodge has survived since 1816 with very little alteration.

== Origin of the name ==
According to legend, the name arose thus: during the hunt a servant went to the count in order to warn him of French soldiers sweeping through the forest. The count is supposed to have swept this aside with the words "turn back for nothing!" (Kehr dich an nichts!).

== Sights ==
- At the lodge is the Laubbrunnen, a fountain dating to the 18th century.
- Two sculptures of lions guarding the entrance to the lodge.
- Two other surviving sculptures.
- Within a few kilometres lie the former hunting lodges of Murrmirnichtviel and Schaudichnichtum.

== Literature ==
- Walter Eitelmann: Rittersteine im Pfälzerwald. 4. reworked and considerably expanded edition. Pfälzerwald-Verein, Neustadt/Weinstraße, 1998. ISBN 3-00-003544-3
- Günter Stein: Burgen und Schlösser in der Pfalz. Weidlich, Frankfurt/Main, 1976. ISBN 3-8035-8356-X
- Magnus Backes, Heinz Straeter: Staatliche Burgen, Schlösser und Altertümer in Rheinland-Pfalz. Schnell und Steiner, Regensburg, 2003. ISBN 3-7954-1566-7
