= Murrmirnichtviel Lodge =

German hunting lodge

Coordinates: 49°26′33″N 8°05′39″E

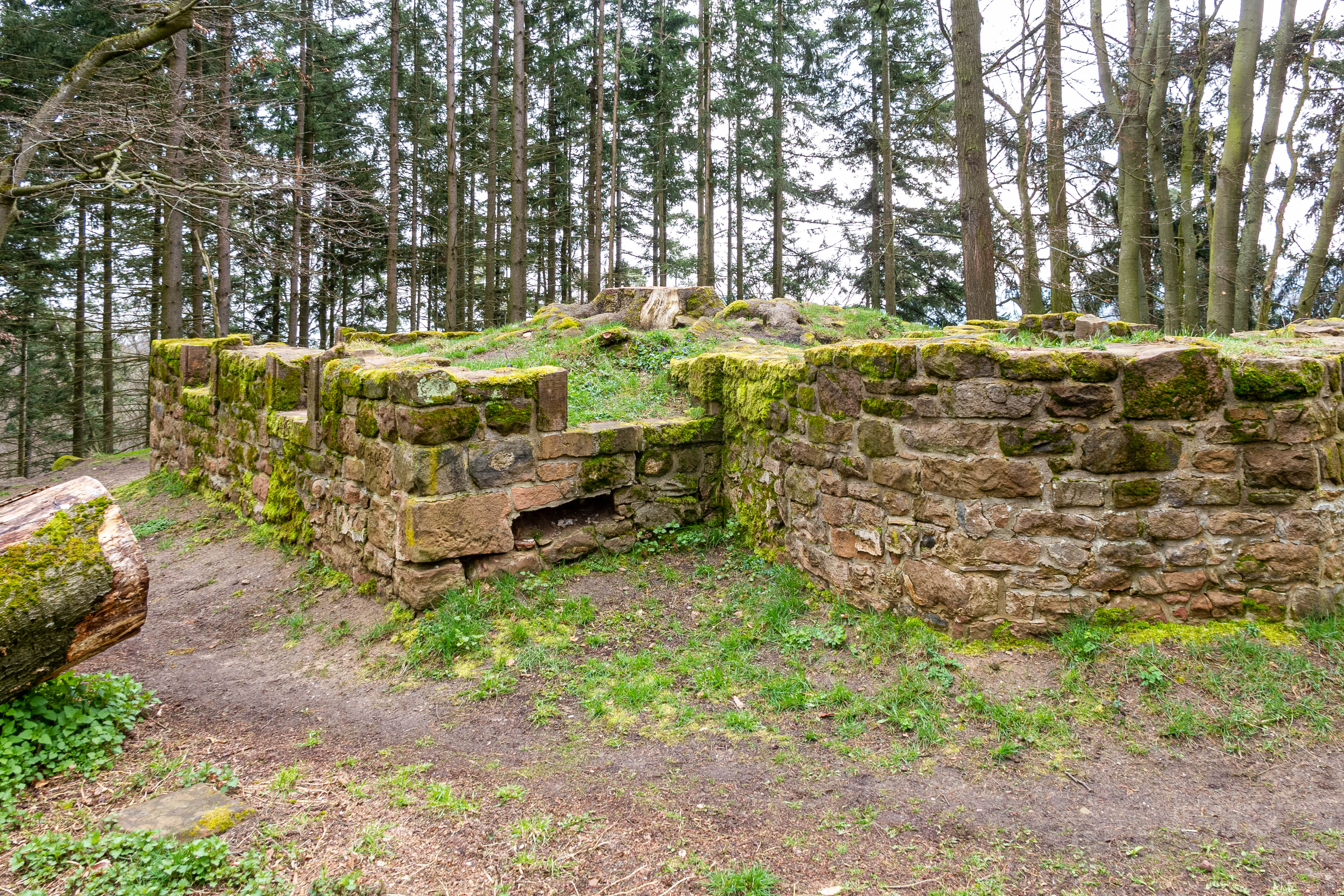
Ruins of Murrmirnichtviel

Murrmirnichtviel Lodge (German: Schloss Murrmirnichtviel), alternatively spelt Murr-mir-nicht-viel, occasionally Murmel-nicht-viel, is a ruined hunting lodge with a watchtower that used to belong to the counts of Leiningen. It lies in the Palatine Forest southwest of the county town of Bad Dürkheim in the German state of Rhineland-Palatinate.

== History ==
Roman graves have been discovered in the vicinity of the ruins that go back to a Roman wayside station established at this spot. In 1534 a watchtower was first mentioned in the recorded and referred to as die Klause, i.e. a narrow, primitive dwelling. It was destroyed in the Thirty Years' War.

The tower - and also the hunting lodge of Kehrdichannichts only 600 metres away - were probably built by John Frederick of Leiningen (1661–1722) initially to guard the boundary of the hunting grounds between Leiningen and Electoral Palatinate, and then later expanded into a small Baroque hunting lodge. They lie fairly high up on the southwestern ridge of the Dreispitz; and enabled good observation of the hunting activities of their neighbours from Electoral Palatinate.

They must have been either destroyed again or neglected, however, soon afterwards because by 1781 the hunting lodge and watchtower were recorded in a Salbuch as the "Friedrichsburg ruins". By no later than 1793, when the French Revolution had enveloped the German regions west of the Rhine, the site was finally razed. A 1797 map first records its new name.

In 1926 the walls were still five metres high. In 1963 the ruins were transferred from the oversight of the old royal Bavarian forestry commission to the state of Rhineland-Palatinate. In 1988/89 the wall remnants, which only comprised parts of the exterior wall with window openings, and the base of the tower, were cleared of vegetation and debris and made safe.

== Name ==
The name Murrmirnichtviel is based on that of the hunting lodge of Kehrdichannichts and may have been derived from a local nickname. It may refer to the disputes between Leiningen and Electoral Palatinate over the boundaries of the hunting estates; Murr mir nicht viel! being intended as a threat or warning and meaning something like "do not grumble much at me (about the ban on entering my hunting estate)!"

== Literature ==
- Magnus Backes, Heinz Straeter: Staatliche Burgen, Schlösser und Altertümer in Rheinland-Pfalz. Schnell & Steiner, Regensburg, 2003, ISBN 3-7954-1566-7.
- Walter Eitelmann: Rittersteine im Pfälzerwald. 4th edn. Pfälzerwald-Verein, Neustadt/Weinstraße, 1998, ISBN 3-00-003544-3.
- Günter Stein: Burgen und Schlösser in der Pfalz. Weidlich, Frankfurt/Main, 1976, ISBN 3-8035-8356-X.
