= Bad Dürkheim =

- Town
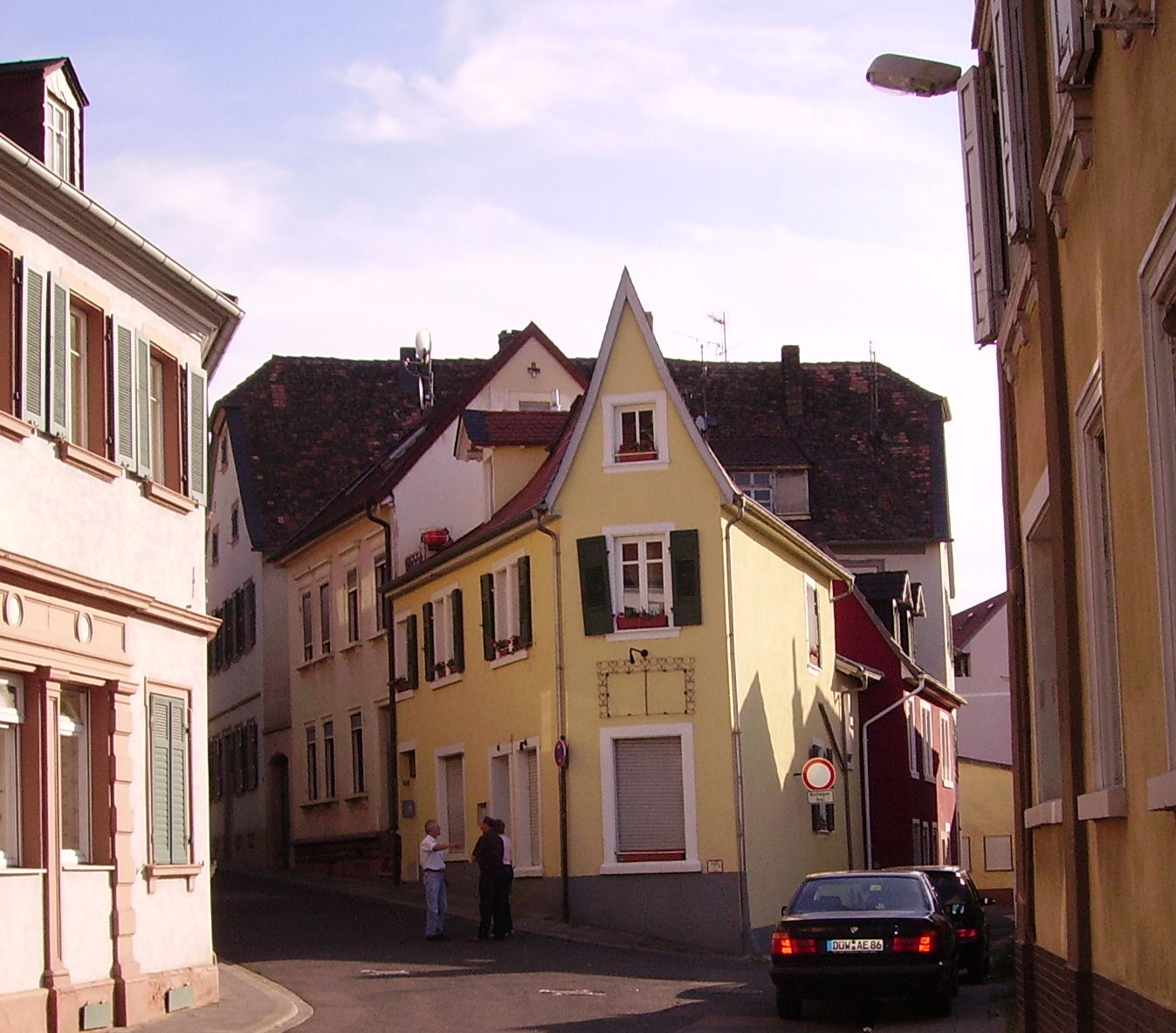

- Coat of arms

- Location of Bad Dürkheim within Bad Dürkheim district
- Interactive map of Bad Dürkheim
- Location within Germany Location within Rhineland-Palatinate
- Coordinates: 49°27′34″N 08°10′05″E
- Country: Germany
- State: Rhineland-Palatinate
- District: Bad Dürkheim

Government
  - Mayor (2024–32): Natalie Bauernschmitt (CDU)

Area
  - Total: 102.55 km^{2} (39.59 sq mi)
- Elevation: 132 m (433 ft)

Population (2025-12-31)
  - Total: 19,002
  - Density: 185.29/km^{2} (479.91/sq mi)
- Time zone: UTC+01:00 (CET)
  - Summer (DST): UTC+02:00 (CEST)
- Postal codes: 67098
- Dialling codes: 06322
- Vehicle registration: DÜW
- Website: www.bad-duerkheim.de

Bad Dürkheim (German pronunciation: [ˌbaːt ˈdʏʁkhaɪm]) is a spa town in the Rhine-Neckar urban agglomeration. It is the seat of the Bad Dürkheim district in Rhineland-Palatinate, Germany, and the site of the discovery of the element caesium, in 1860.

== Geography ==
=== Location ===
Bad Dürkheim lies at the edge of Palatinate Forest on the German Wine Route some 30 km east of Kaiserslautern and just under 20 km west of Ludwigshafen and Mannheim. Roughly 15 km to the south lies Neustadt an der Weinstraße. In Bad Dürkheim, Bundesstraßen 37 and 271 cross each other. From west to east through the town flows the river Isenach.

=== Constituent communities ===
Bad Dürkheim's Ortsteile are Grethen, Hardenburg, Hausen, Leistadt, Seebach and Ungstein including Pfeffingen.

=== Climate ===
Bad Dürkheim has a humid subtropical climate (Köppen climate classification Cfa). Yearly precipitation in Bad Dürkheim is 574 mm, which is low, falling into the lowest quarter of the precipitation chart for all Germany. Lower figures recorded at only 16% of the German Weather Service's weather stations. The driest month is February. The most rainfall comes in May. In that month, precipitation is 1.6 times what it is in February. Precipitation varies little. Only 1% of the weather stations record lower seasonal swings. The warm climate allows the cultivation of mediterranean plants like the chinese windmill palm, stone pine, mediterranean cypress, fig tree, olive tree and oleander, which can be seen in many gardens and public spaces.

== History ==
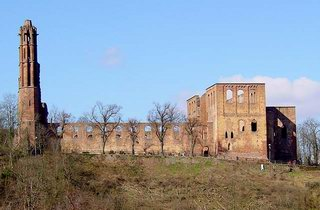
Limburg Abbey

Between 1200 and 500 BC, the area around the eastern end of the Isenach valley was settled by Celts, who also built the Heidenmauer ("Heathen Wall"), a Celtic ring wall.

In recent years, the ruins of a Roman villa have been uncovered in Bad Durkheim, known today as Villa Rustika. The site gives a fascinating insight into what life must have been like for the Roman elite and non-elite who lived and died in (what would have been considered) a “provincial backwater.”

The earliest documented appearance of the name of the town is in the Lorsch codex of 1 June 778, as Turnesheim. A letter of enfeoffment from the Bishop of Speyer in 946 mentions Thuringeheim. About 1025, building work on Limburg Abbey, today preserved only as ruins, was begun.

Town rights were granted on 1 January 1360, but were withdrawn again in 1471 after Elector Friedrich the Victorious of the Palatinate conquered the town and wrought considerable destruction. After the slow reconstruction, Dürkheim passed to the Counts of Leiningen in 1554.

In 1689, the town was almost completely destroyed when French troops in the Nine Years' War (the Pfälzischer Erbfolgekrieg, or War of the Palatine Succession) carried out a scorched earth campaign in the Electorate of the Palatinate. This time, though, reconstruction was swifter, and Count Johann Friedrich of Leiningen granted Dürkheim town rights again as early as 1700. In 1725, Dürkheim became the main seat of the Counts and later Princes of Leiningen, who resided in Schloss Dürkheim.

In the late 18th century, as the French Revolution was beginning to spread into southwest Germany, Dürkheim, as the Canton of Durkheim (without the umlaut), became part of the Department of Mont-Tonnerre (or Donnersberg in German). After the Napoleonic Wars, it ended up along with the rest of the Electorate of the Palatinate's territory on the Rhine's left bank in the Kingdom of Bavaria.

In 1860, Robert Bunsen and Gustav Kirchhoff discovered the metallic element caesium in the mineral water from the Durkheim springs.

For its seven mineral springs, Dürkheim was given the epithet Solbad ("brine bath"), and in 1904 it was given leave to change its name to Bad Dürkheim (Bad is German for "bath", and a place may only bear this epithet on state recognition of its status as a spa town). In 1913, the Rhein-Haardtbahn (a narrow-gauge tramway) was opened, linking Bad Dürkheim with Ludwigshafen and Mannheim.

In 1935, Grethen, Hausen and Seebach were amalgamated.

After 1933 the number of Jews in Bad Dürkheim reduced drastically, due to the economic boycott, constantly increasing repression and dehumanization (1933: 184, 1937: 98, 1938: 40). During the Night of Broken Glass in 1938, the synagogue was plundered. The 19 Jews still surviving here in 1940 were deported to the Gurs concentration camp in October of that year.

On 18 March 1945, Bad Dürkheim was badly hit by an Allied air raid in which more than 300 people died.

In Rhineland-Palatinate's administrative reform, Hardenburg and Leistadt were amalgamated with Bad Dürkheim on 7 June 1969, as was Ungstein along with its outlying hamlet of Pfeffingen on 22 April 1972. Moreover, the town, having belonged to the old district of Neustadt an der Weinstraße, became the district seat of the newly formed district of Bad Dürkheim and also lay in the likewise newly formed Regierungsbezirk of Rheinhessen-Pfalz, which was later abolished in 2000.

In September 2023, 73.7 percent voted against renaming street names whose namesakes had a close connection and ideological proximity to National Socialism.

== Demographics ==
=== Religion ===
In 2007, 52.8% of the inhabitants were Evangelical, 32.3% Catholic, and 14.8% stated no religion. The rest belonged to other faiths.

== Politics ==
=== Town council ===
The council is made up of 32 honorary members, who were most recently elected at the municipal election held on 25 May 2014, and the full-time mayor as chairman.

The municipal election held on 25 May 2014 yielded the following results:

Year	SPD	CDU	FDP	Greens	The Left	REP	FWG	Total
2014	9	14	3	2	1	–	3	32 seats
2009	9	12	3	3	1	1	3	32 seats
2004	9	14	2	2	–	2	3	32 seats

On the town council, the CDU, the FDP and the Greens form a coalition, making Bad Dürkheim the only town in Germany governed by a so-called Jamaica coalition. This special arrangement was concluded in 1999 after the SPD lost its majority. It has been twice extended by five years after municipal elections in 2004 and 2009.

=== Mayor ===
Wolfgang Lutz (CDU) was the Mayor of Bad Dürkheim from 2000 to 2015; he was re-elected on 6 May 2007 for a further eight years with 75.3% of the vote. His successor was Christoph Glogger (SPD), who was elected in July 2015 with 52.83% of the votes. He was succeeded by Natalie Bauernschmitt (CDU), elected in June 2023.

== Coat of arms ==
The German blazon reads: In Silber ein schwarzer Maueranker (Türangel). This might be rendered in English as: Argent, a wall brace (hinge) sable.

The arms go back to a court seal from 1405, which itself was a reference to the arms borne by the Lords of Dürkheim.

Between 1540 and 1776, the arms featured a cross and a crozier above the escutcheon, indicating Limburg Abbey's ownership of the town.

== Town partnerships ==
- Paray-le-Monial, Saône-et-Loire, Burgundy, France
- Wells, Somerset, England, United Kingdom
- Kluczbork, Opole Voivodeship, Poland
- (Germany) Kempten im Allgäu, Bavaria
- (Germany) Bad Berka, Thuringia (sponsorship)
- (Germany) Michelstadt, Hesse (town friendship)
- (United States) Emmaus, Pennsylvania, USA (town friendship)

== Culture and sightseeing ==
=== Buildings ===
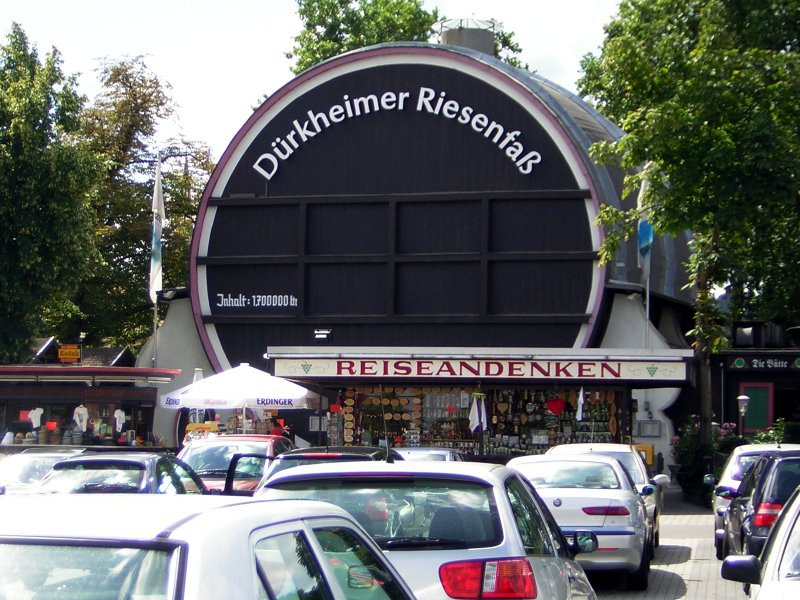
The Giant Cask of Dürkheim (Dürkheimer Riesenfass)

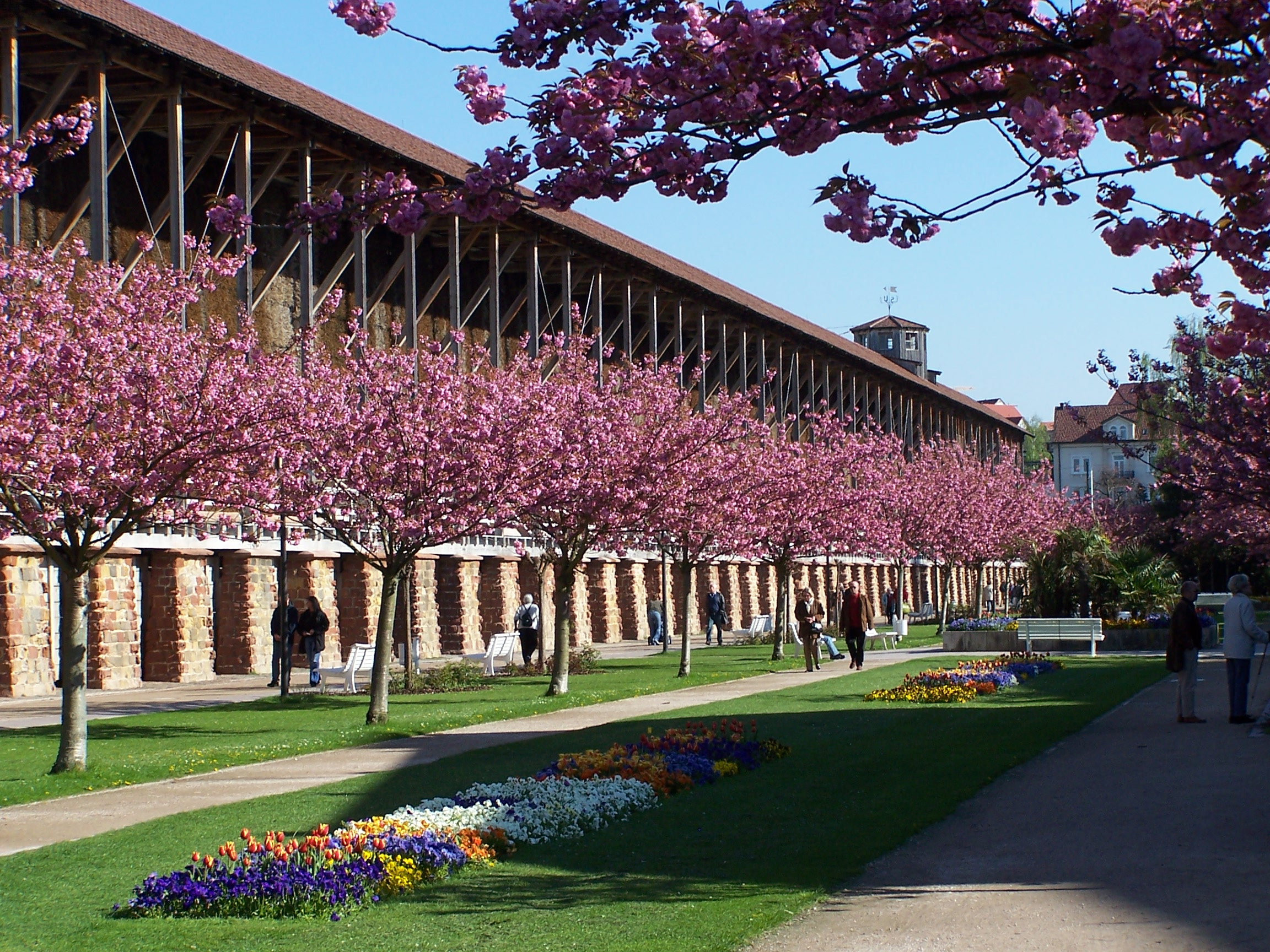
Bad Dürkheim graduation tower

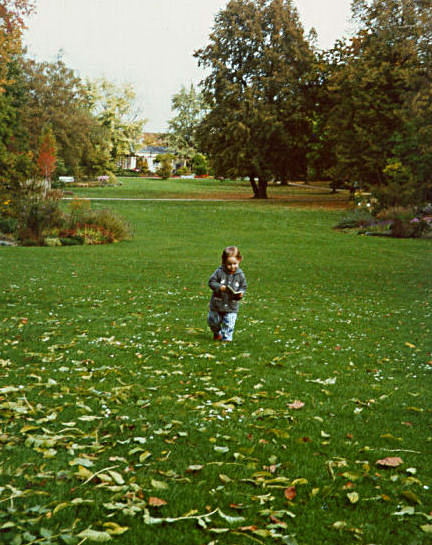
Spa park

==== Limburg Abbey and Hardenburg ====
At the edge of the Palatinate Forest lie the once thriving Limburg Abbey’s ruins. In the 9th century, the Salian Dukes from Worms built a fortress on the Linthberg as their family seat. In the early 11th century, the fortress was converted into a monastery with a basilica. It existed until the mid-16th century.

Above the like-named constituent community are spread the castle ruins of Hardenburg. Beginning in the 13th century, the castle was the seat of the Counts of Leiningen, but was built in its current shape only in the 16th century. It was destroyed once and for all in the late 18th century.

==== Hunting lodges ====
In the town’s woodlands, nobles built the hunting lodges (Jagdschlösser) Kehrdichannichts (whose name means “Do-not-mind-anything”), Murrmirnichtviel (“Do-not-grumble-at-me-much”) and Schaudichnichtum (“Do-not-look-about”). While the first is still used today as a forester's house, there is nothing but ruins left of the other two.

==== Churches ====
Saint Louis's Catholic Parish Church (Ludwigskirche) was built in 1828 and 1829 in the Classicist style. The plans were inspired by a master builder from Baden named Weinbrenner. The building work was backed and financially supported by King Ludwig I of Bavaria (Bad Dürkheim was part of Bavaria's Palatine exclave at the time).

The Protestant Castle Church (Schlosskirche) – formerly Saint John's Church (Kirche St. Johannis) – was built in the late 13th century. Its tower, with a height of 70 m, is the Further (or “Anterior”, that is, East) Palatinate's third tallest churchtower.

The Castle Church (Burgkirche) was built in the 18th century, destroyed in 1945 and thereafter built once again. Today it serves as a Protestant community centre. In its tower hangs a 317 kg bell poured in 1758. It underwent improvements in 2006 and is rung by a hand-drawn rope. It is rung each year at 14:00 on 18 March in memory of the air raid on Bad Dürkheim in 1945, and also at 17:00 on the first Saturday in Advent, together with the other bells in the inner town, to usher in the new liturgical year.

==== Ancient sites ====
The Heidenmauer (“Heathen Wall”) is the remnants of a great Celtic settlement with a 2.5 km-long ringwall, which was built about 500 BC.

The Roman quarry, Kriemhildenstuhl, was in use in the 4th century.

==== Modern sites ====
On the western edge of the Wurstmarkt grounds stands the Dürkheimer Riesenfass ("Giant Barrel"), the world's biggest barrel. It houses a restaurant.

The Kurhaus (“spa house”) holds not only catering rooms and lounges but also the Dürkheim casino.

The graduation tower, known locally as Saline, is part of Bad Dürkheim's spa facilities. With a length of some 330 m, it is one of the biggest of its kind in Germany. In the wake of a fire on 7 April 2007, in which great parts of the facility were destroyed, the outdoor inhalatorium has reopened as of June 2011. The opportunity is also being taken to modify the spa park.

=== Natural monuments ===
The foremost outing and hiking destinations in the Palatinate Forest are the Isenachweiher (a small reservoir) and the Drachenfels (despite its name, a hill), but especially, near the ruins of the Weilach estate, the Teufelsstein ("Devil’s Rock" – another hill) and the Heidenfels ("Heathen Crag"), as well as the Kupferfelsen ("Copper Crags") near the former forester's house Lindemannsruhe.

=== Regular events ===
==== Wurstmarkt ====
Above all, Bad Dürkheim is well known for the Dürkheimer Wurstmarkt, whose name literally means “sausage market”, although it is in fact the world's biggest wine festival, drawing more than 600,000 visitors each year.

==== Literature prize ====
The town of Bad Dürkheim awards the Limburg-Preis for literature, named after the Abbey, every three years.

==== Giant roulette ====
Every year in August, the Riesenroulette – “Giant Roulette Wheel” – is set up in the spa park as part of the Kurparkgala. It is the world's biggest roulette wheel and uses a ball the size of a football.

==== Stadtgeläute ====
The “Town Bellringing” is heard once a year at 17:00 on the first Saturday in Advent, and is performed by ringers at the town's three churches, the Burgkirche, the Schlosskirche and the Ludwigskirche.

== Economy and infrastructure ==
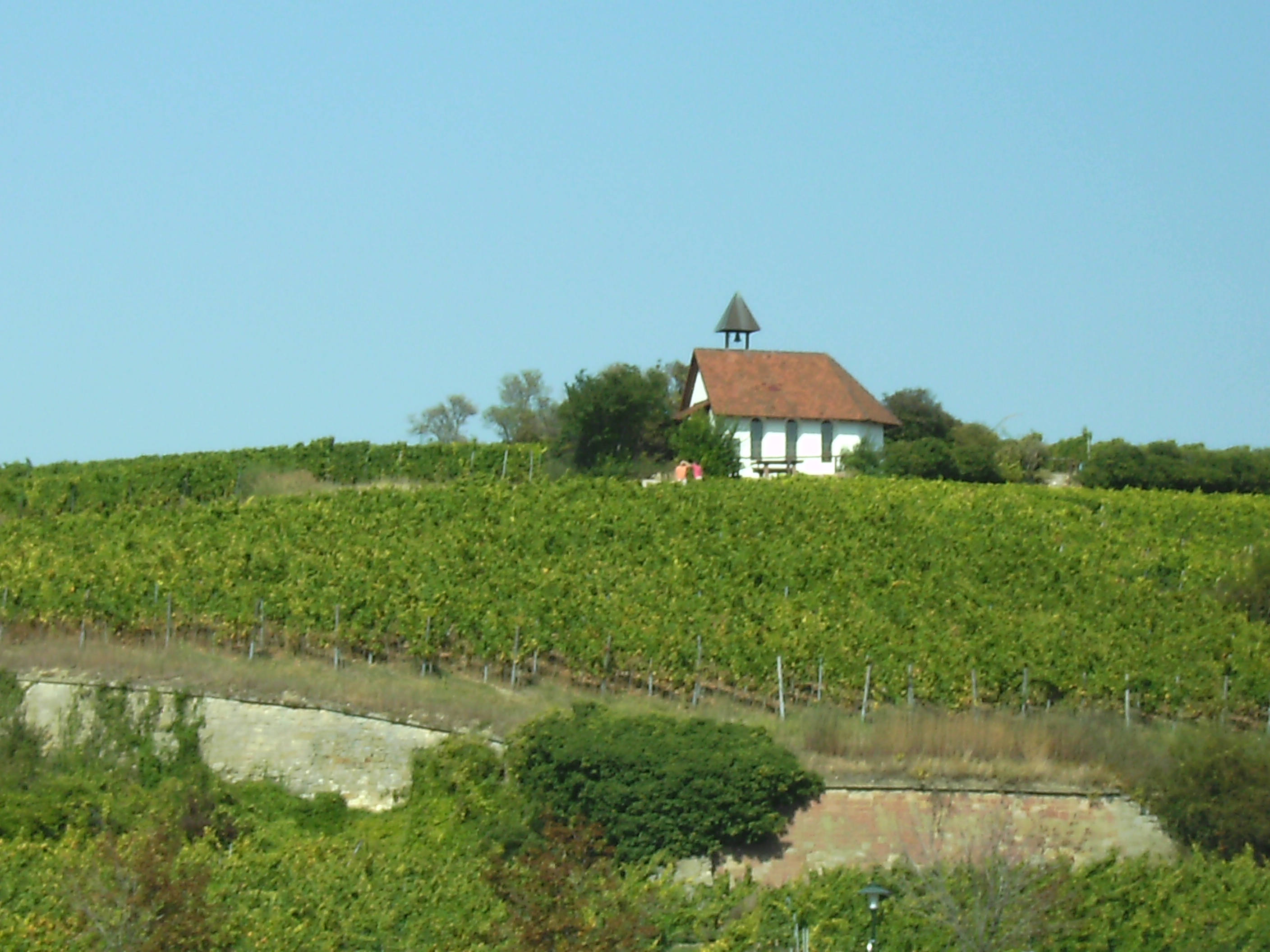
Chapel on the Michaelsberg, the Wurstmarkt's birthplace

Bad Dürkheim's main industry is winegrowing. With 855 ha (3.3 square miles) of vineyards under cultivation, the town is the Palatinate’s third biggest winegrowing centre. In Rhineland-Palatinate as a whole, it ranks fourth. Nevertheless, tourism and health promotion play an important role. Some spa clinics have located in the town. Furthermore, Bad Dürkheim was one of the few places in Germany with a graduation tower that was still being run, until it all but burnt down in 2007. It was rebuilt in 2010. Among midsize businesses, the paper and wood industry is represented, along with various technology businesses.

=== Transport ===
Bad Dürkheim is linked to the long-distance road network by Bundesstraßen 37 (Kaiserslautern–Mosbach) and 271 (Neustadt–Monsheim). The four-lane Autobahn A 650 has still not been built quite as far as Bad Dürkheim.

The Rhein-Haardtbahn (a narrow-gauge tramway), which now runs as “Line 4”, runs through Maxdorf and links Bad Dürkheim with Ludwigshafen and Mannheim, where it joins with the Mannheim tramway network at Mannheim Hauptbahnhof and then continues to Heddesheim. On Sundays and holidays, the RNV-Express offers a through tramway connection with five two-car units running as far as Heidelberg; the RNV-Express does not stop everywhere and has no line number. The Pfälzische Nordbahn from Neustadt an der Weinstraße to Monsheim serves the town at a terminal station (although the right-of-way branches both ways after a short distance). The excursion train, the Elsass-Express (“Alsace Express”), also begins its run here, taking passengers all the way to the Alsatian town of Wissembourg just inside France.

Until 1981, there was also a gondola lift that whisked riders from the Wurstmarkt grounds to the Teufelsstein (“Devil’s Stone” – a mountain). Since 2005, the town has been preparing its reintroduction.

To Bad Dürkheim's north-east lies a recreational airfield, the Flugplatz Bad Dürkheim.

=== Media ===
Local print media are the daily newspaper Die Rheinpfalz (with a local section for the Bad Dürkheim region) and the weekly Stadtanzeiger.

On cable television, the public-access channel Offener Kanal Neustadt und Weinstraße can be received.

=== Education ===
==== Primary schools ====
- Salierschule
- Pestalozzischule
- Grundschule Grethen

==== Combined primary school and Hauptschule ====
- Valentin-Ostertag-Schule

==== Realschule ====
- Carl-Orff-Realschule (roughly 1,000 students)

==== Gymnasium ====
- Werner-Heisenberg-Gymnasium (roughly 1,250 students)

==== Professional training schools ====
- BBS (Berufsbildende Schule) Bad Dürkheim

==== Special schools ====
- Siegmund-Crämer-Schule
- Limburgschule (roughly 130 students)

=== Telecommunications ===
==== Transmission tower ====
The transmission tower, a 130 m-tall steel-reinforced concrete mast, stands on the Weilerskopf and is used by Deutsche Telekom. This standard tower, or Typenturm, was built in 1969. Position: 49°29′26″N 8°7′31″E.

==== Microwave transmission tower ====
The Richtfunkturm, a 72 m-tall steel-reinforced concrete mast, was formerly used by the military. The operational buildings stood in the outlying centre of Hardenburg. Today the tower is used for microwave transmission for the O_{2} and E+ cellular networks. Position: 49°28′33″N 8°7′27″E.

=== Public institutions ===
Bad Dürkheim, as the district seat, hosts the like-named district's administration. It has at its disposal an Amtsgericht that belongs to the Landgerichtsbezirk of Frankenthal and to the Oberlandesgerichtsbezirk of Zweibrücken.

On 23 November 2008, the Palatinate's first Protestant urn graveyard was consecrated in Bad Dürkheim's outlying centre of Seebach. It is found right at the monastery church. The burials there are exclusively cinerary urns made of disintegrating unfired earth. Charged with the artistic design was the Landau sculptor Madeleine Dietz.

== Notable people ==
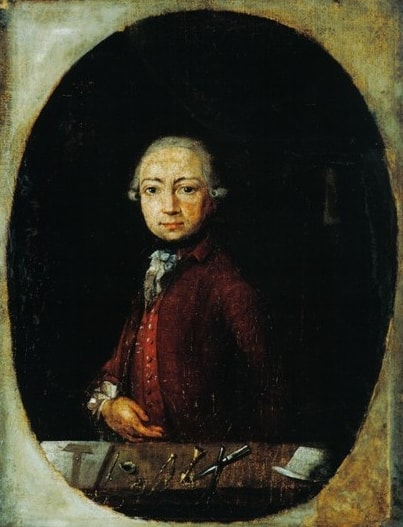
Johann Michael Hartung

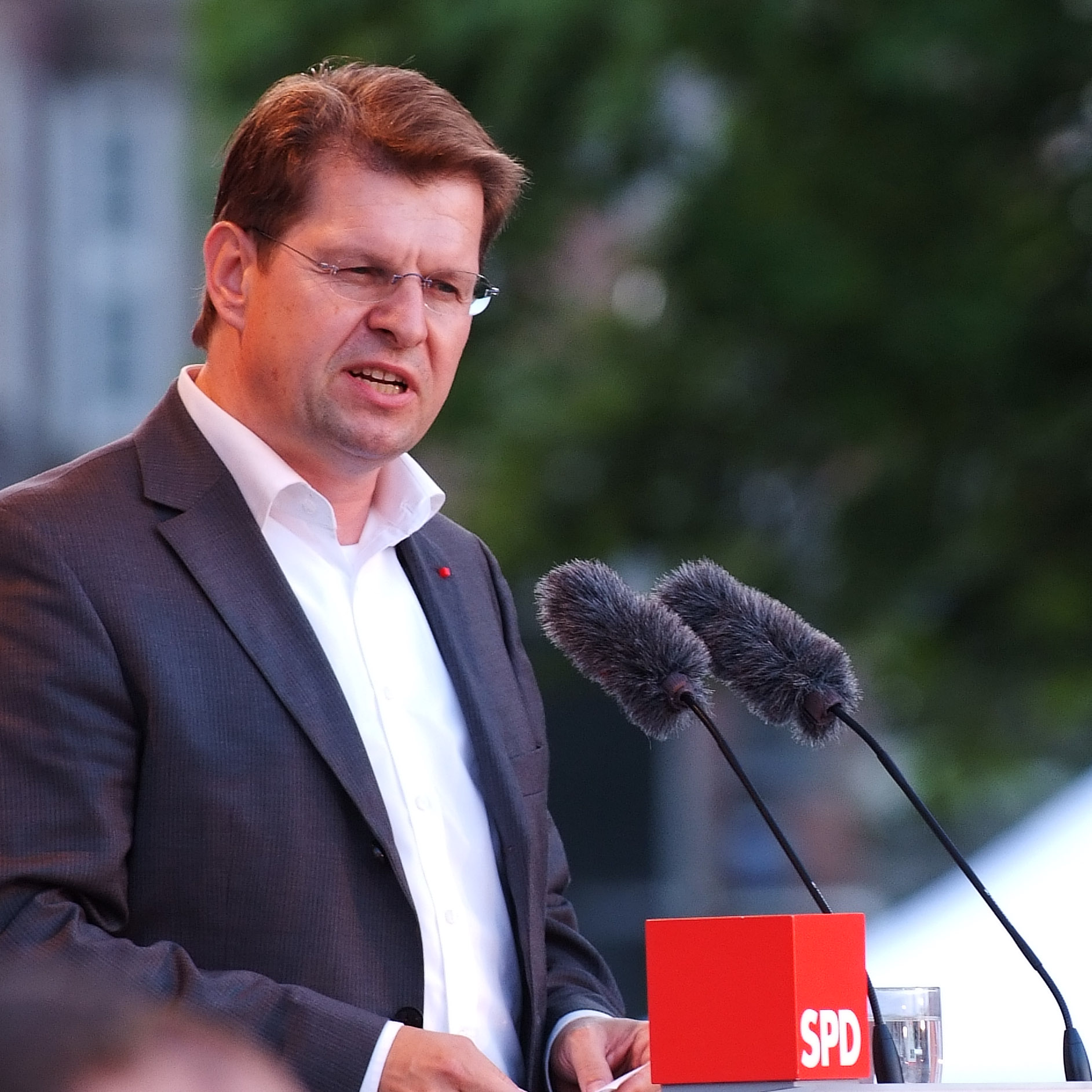
Ralf Stegner

- Carl Friedrich Wilhelm (1724–1807), first Prince of Leiningen
- Emich Carl zu Leiningen (1763−1814), second Prince of Leiningen
- Philipp Fauth (1867–1941), schoolteacher and astronomer
- Heiner Dopp (b. 1956), national-level field hockey player
- Ralf Stegner (b. 1959), politician (SPD), Member of Schleswig-Holstein parliament since 2005
- Andreas Keith (b. 1967), politician (AfD)
- Torsten Lieberknecht (b. 1973), footballer
- Steffen Bohl (b. 1983), footballer
- Christian Henel (b. 1988), footballer
- Tobias Sippel (b. 1988), footballer
- Jean Zimmer (b. 1993), footballer

=== Notable people associated with the town ===
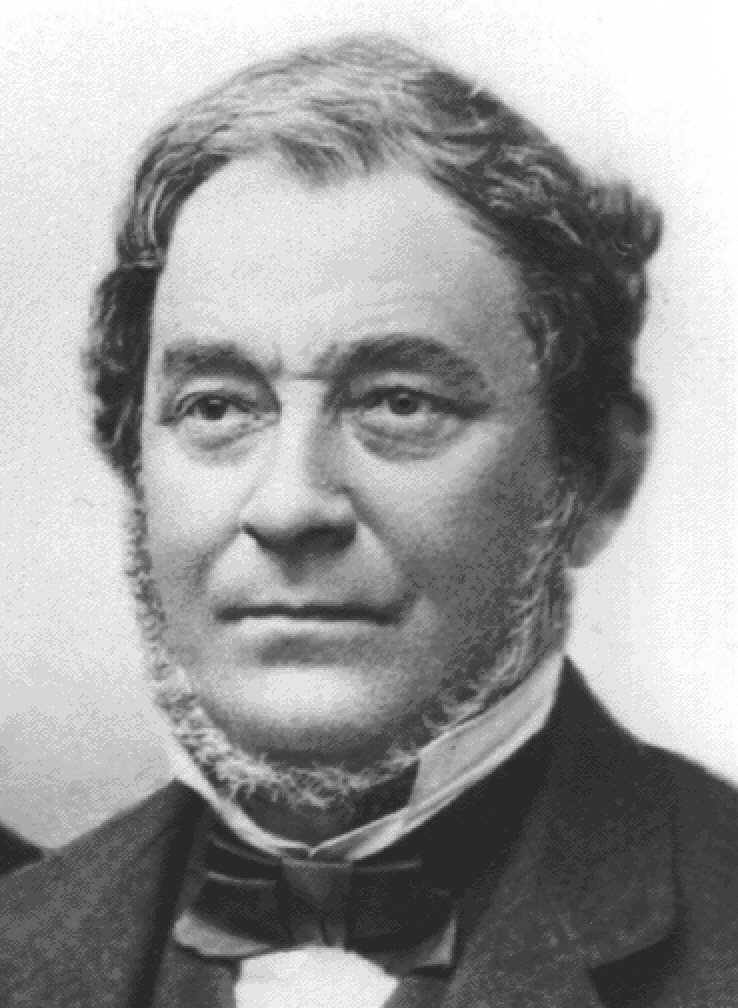
Robert Bunsen c. 1860

- Viktor Brack (1904−1948), executed Holocaust perpetrator, attended the Realschule in Bad Dürkheim.
- Robert Wilhelm Bunsen (1811−1899) discovered by investigation of Bad Dürkheim's brine springs, among them the Maxquelle, the elements rubidium and caesium.
- Paul Camille von Denis (1796−1872) died in Bad Dürkheim.
- Rudolf Virchow (1821−1902), medic, visited the Dürkheim Brine Bath.

== Further reading and film ==
- Walter Dautermann: Bad Dürkheim: Chronik einer Salierstadt. Landau 1978
- SWR (Inhaltsangabe): Die Toskana der Pfalz. Rund um Bad Dürkheim. Reisedokumentation, 2008, 28 min., Erstausstrahlung 15. Juli 2008
