= Magnus Backes =

German art historian and historical preservationist (1930–2019)

Magnus Backes (17 September 1930 – 21 May 2019) was a German art historian and historic preservationist. From 1983 to 1991, he succeeded Werner Bornheim gen. Schilling and Hartmut Hofrichter as the third Landeskonservator of the General Directorate for Cultural Heritage Rhineland-Palatinate Rheinland-Pfalz in Mainz.

== Life ==
=== Origin and education ===
Born in Cologne, Backes first attended a grammar school in Bonn before taking up studies in history of art and archaeology at the Rheinische Friedrich-Wilhelms-Universität Bonn there. In 1957, he was awarded a Dr. phil. with Heinrich Lützeler for his thesis Julius Ludwig Rothweil, ein rheinisch-hessischer Barockarchitekt and his dissertation was also awarded the Paul Clemen Scholarship.

=== Career ===
Following his studies and doctorate, Backes found employment from 1958 to 1961 as curator at Marksburg, which is owned by the German Castles Association. These years had a lasting influence on his further life, but also on his work as a monument conservator. It was at Marksburg, the only hilltop castle on the Middle Rhine that had remained undestroyed over the centuries, that he met his future wife, whom he married in 1960. His work on this monument "probably decided his career path, to deal directly and practically with the monuments of history and to make them clear to people, to make them understandable and, last but not least, to preserve them for future generations." He subsequently published several times on the Marksburg, some in higher editions.

In the following years until 1964, Backes was entrusted with art-historical work for the Beltzer publishing house and in particular for the Dehio-Vereinigung. His most important work from this period is the Hesse edition from the series of Handbuch der deutschen Kunstdenkmäler founded by Georg Dehio and continued by Ernst Gall.

=== Monument conservator ===
In 1964, he finally joined the Landesamt für Denkmalpflege Rheinland-Pfalz as a research assistant. Initially an employee, he rose there to conservator and ultimately to senior conservator before moving to the Bayerisches Landesamt für Denkmalpflege in Munich in 1973. As "area consultant, head of department and representative of the general conservator", he not only learned more about Franconian culture, but also about the skills needed to run a department. Experience that would be of use to him after his appointment as the new State Conservator of Rhineland-Palatinate by the then Minister of Culture Georg Gölter on 1 January 1983.

Until 30 June 1991 his office grew to up to 160 employees at times, with simultaneous restructuring towards decentralisation.

In addition to his official activities, during which he developed, among other things, a financing model for the launch of the Denkmaltopographie Bundesrepublik Deutschland in Rhineland-Palatinate, Backes also belonged to numerous organisations, associations and corporations. The external reputation was just as important to him as the "internal consolidation" and expansion of the office he led. His vice-presidency in the German National Committee of ICOMOS for several years should be mentioned. At the level of UNESCO, he represented the Federal Republic of Germany during the talks held in Australia concerning the inclusion of the Speyer Cathedral and the Würzburg Residence (1981) to the World Heritage List.

Backes, who also received teaching assignments at the universities of Applied Sciences in Koblenz University of Applied Sciences, Augsburg University of Applied Sciences and at the Bayerische Verwaltungsschule, was also responsible for the initiative to found the Institute for Stone Conservation for Hesse, Rhineland-Palatinate and Saarland.

Backes died in Wiesbaden at the age of 88.

== Publications ==
- Backes, Magnus (1959). Julius Ludwig Rothweil, ein rheinisch-hessischer Barockarchitekt. Studien zur deutschen Kunstgeschichte. Heitz. p. 4. doi:10.11588/diglit.29801 – via Heidelberger historische Bestände - digital.
- Backes, Magnus (1975). Hessen. Dehio-Handbuch (2nd ed.). Berlin: Deutscher Kunstverlag. ISBN 3-422-00309-6.
- Backes, Magnus; Caspary, Hans; Müller-Dietrich, Norbert (1977). Die Kunstdenkmäler des Rhein-Hunsrück-Kreises. Deutscher Kunstverlag. ISBN 3-422-00551-X.
