= Werner Bornheim gen. Schilling =

German art historian and historical preservationist

Werner Franz Josef Wilhelm Detlev Bornheim gen. Schilling (6 February 1915 – 29 October 1992) was a German art historian and historic preservationist. From its establishment in 1946 until 1980, he headed the General Directorate for Cultural Heritage Rhineland-Palatinate and the administration of the state palaces of Rhineland-Palatinate or their predecessor institutions as Landeskonservator.

== Life ==
=== Origin ===
Born in Cologne, Bornheim (given name) Schilling was a descendant of a family that had been settled in Langel on the right bank of the Rhine since the 17th century. His grandfather Mathias (1852-1899), together with his four siblings, sold the inherited land in Langel in 1888 and finally settled in Nippes north of Cologne's old town. From Bornheim's marriage to Anna Maria Lob (1857-1931), the Duisburg-born daughter of Mathias Lob, director of the municipal gas and waterworks there, produced, among others, their son Richard (born in Cologne in 1885). After studying at the universities of Paris (Sorbonne), Zurich and Cologne, he graduated as a social civil servant in 1915. Richard's marriage to Victoria Speckhan (born 1889 in Cologne-Nippes), the daughter of Franz Josef Speckhan and Katharina von Bornheim gen. Schilling produced their son Werner.

=== Career ===
After attending the Rheinische Ritterakademie in Bedburg studied art history Schilling from 1934 onwards at the universities of Köln, Bonn, München and finally Berlin. In particular, he was scientifically influenced by Wilhelm Pinder, Gerhart Rodenwaldt and Nicolai Hartmann.

In all his speeches, one noticed the generation in which he had grown up: it was the time of those who had studied with Wilhelm Pinder, to whom Pinder had opened the eyes to beauty and loosened the tongue to its price and interpretation.

— Franz Ronig in his remembrance of Bornheim von Schilling's last great speech in honour of Paul Clemen already marked by fatal illness.

On 17 September 1940, he was awarded a Dr. phil. in Berlin with the thesis Zur Entwicklung der Innenraumdarstellung in der Niederländischen Malerei bis Jan van Eyck. promoviert. Subsequently, during the Second World War, he found work as a volunteer at the Rheinisches Museum (Haus der Rheinischen Heimat) in Cologne-Deutz and the Wallraf-Richartz-Museum & Fondation Corboud (1942) in Cologne employment. While Cologne continued to suffer from the heavy air raids and increasingly fell into rubble and ashes, but also threatened to sink into chaos, Bornheim gen. Schilling was busy with protective measures. His prudence in connection with the preservation and protection of threatened cultural assets found its first opportunity for practical proof in the removal of Cologne's museum holdings to Langenau.

After the liberation of Cologne, he then briefly assisted the reappointed Lord Mayor Konrad Adenauer, with whom he had been in contact since 1944, as custodian and advisor for the preservation of monuments and museums, before he was able to use the experience he had gained in this way usefully in his upcoming places of service. Afterwards, in 1945, he first changed to the position of government conservator of the Regierungsbezirk Koblenz and subsequently, in 1946, to that of provincial conservator for Rhineland and Hesse-Nassau. When the State Office for the Preservation of Monuments of the newly founded federal state of Rhineland-Palatinate was formed, he was then appointed the first State Conservator. He remained in this position until his retirement in 1980. During this period, the office had grown to about 100 employees.

Schilling published extensively on the art history of the Rhineland, its artists but also cultural monuments in particular. His three-volume work Rheinische Höhenburgen, published in 1964, deserves special mention. According to Ronig, his very personal essay Rheinische Denkmalpflege - Rheinland-Pfalz 1945 bis 1980, published in 1981, represents "something like the intellectual testament" of him.

Whoever has experienced, for example, his commitment to the canalisation of the Moselle, his involvement in the conversion of the Petersberg Hotel, his decisions in the preservation and design of the cathedrals, churches, castles and - countless - fortresses in Rhineland-Palatinate, or comprehends them today, will recognise the extent and depth of his achievements. Norbert Heinen in an obituary.

=== Honorary posts ===
Outside of his work as a state conservator, Bornheim took on numerous other functions and tasks. Among them are: his involvement in the "Association of State Monument Conservators in the Federal Republic of Germany", to which he belonged since its foundation in 1948. In 1958, he became deputy chairman and from 1963 to 1975 he held this position himself. Furthermore, the presidency of the Deutsches Nationalkomitee von ICOMOS, which was offered at its establishment in 1964, as well as membership of the Executive Council in Paris and the German Commission for UNESCO. In 1975, he hosted the 4th General Assembly of International Council on Monuments and Sites in this capacity in Rothenburg. Schilling actively maintained memberships in numerous other domestic and foreign commissions. For example, in the Bund Heimat und Umwelt in Deutschland Head of the Expert Group on Monument Preservation and corresponding member of the Compagnie des Architects en Chef des Monuments Historique de la France.

Various organisations awarded him honorary titles. Schilling was an honorary citizen of the city of New Orleans and an honorary member of the German Castles Association as well as the Grand Ducal Institute. In addition, he was chairman of the Rheinischer Verein für Denkmalpflege und Landschaftsschutz in Cologne from 1981 to 1990 and was then appointed its honorary chairman.

He also held an honorary professorship at the Johannes Gutenberg University Mainz in Mainz. Werner Bornheim gen. Schilling was awarded the Federal Cross of Merit on ribbon in 1980 and the Federal Cross of Merit 1st class in 1985.

=== Family ===
Schilling, who spoke English, French and Italian in addition to his mother tongue, had been married to the doctor Godula Frosch since 1955. Their marriage produced a daughter and a son.

Werner Bornheim was a fascinating personality in his own way: his expertise, his sparkling spirit, his friendly (sometimes biting) humour, his sensual nature, his cheerfulness and his Catholic religion combined in him to form a unity. One should actually add the word "Rhenish" in front of each of these characterising words; only then does one have Werner Bornheim!

Bornheim died in Wiesbaden at the age of 77.

== Publications ==
- Rheinische Höhenburgen. Publisher Rheinischer Verein für Denkmalpflege und Landschaftsschutz (Jahrbuch 1961–1963), Gesellschaft für Buchdruckerei, Neuss 1964, 3 volumes.
- Rheinische Denkmalpflege – Rheinland-Pfalz 1945 bis 1980. In Erhalten und gestalten. 75 Jahre Rheinischer Verein für Denkmalpflege und Landschaftsschutz. Publisher Rheinischer Verein für Denkmalpflege und Landschaftsschutz (Jahrbuch 1981), Gesellschaft für Buchdruckerei, Neuss 1981, ISBN 3-88094-373-7, pp. 57–164.
