= Battenberg, Rhineland-Palatinate =

Battenberg
- Municipality
- Coat of arms

- Location of Battenberg within Bad Dürkheim district
- Interactive map of Battenberg
- Location within Germany Location within Rhineland-Palatinate
- Coordinates: 49°31′55″N 08°08′18″E
- Country: Germany
- State: Rhineland-Palatinate
- District: Bad Dürkheim
- Municipal assoc.: Leiningerland

Government
  - Mayor (2019–24): Hans-Peter Schmidt (Ind.)

Area
  - Total: 5.45 km^{2} (2.10 sq mi)
- Elevation: 300–330 m (980–1,080 ft)

Population (2025-12-31)
  - Total: 375
  - Density: 68.8/km^{2} (178/sq mi)
- Time zone: UTC+01:00 (CET)
  - Summer (DST): UTC+02:00 (CEST)
- Postal codes: 67271
- Dialling codes: 06359
- Vehicle registration: DÜW
- Website: www.battenberg-pfalz.de

Battenberg (German pronunciation: [ˈbatn̩ˌbɛʁk]; officially Battenberg (Pfalz)) is an Ortsgemeinde – a municipality belonging to a Verbandsgemeinde, a kind of collective municipality – in the Bad Dürkheim district in Rhineland-Palatinate, Germany.

== Geography ==
=== Location ===
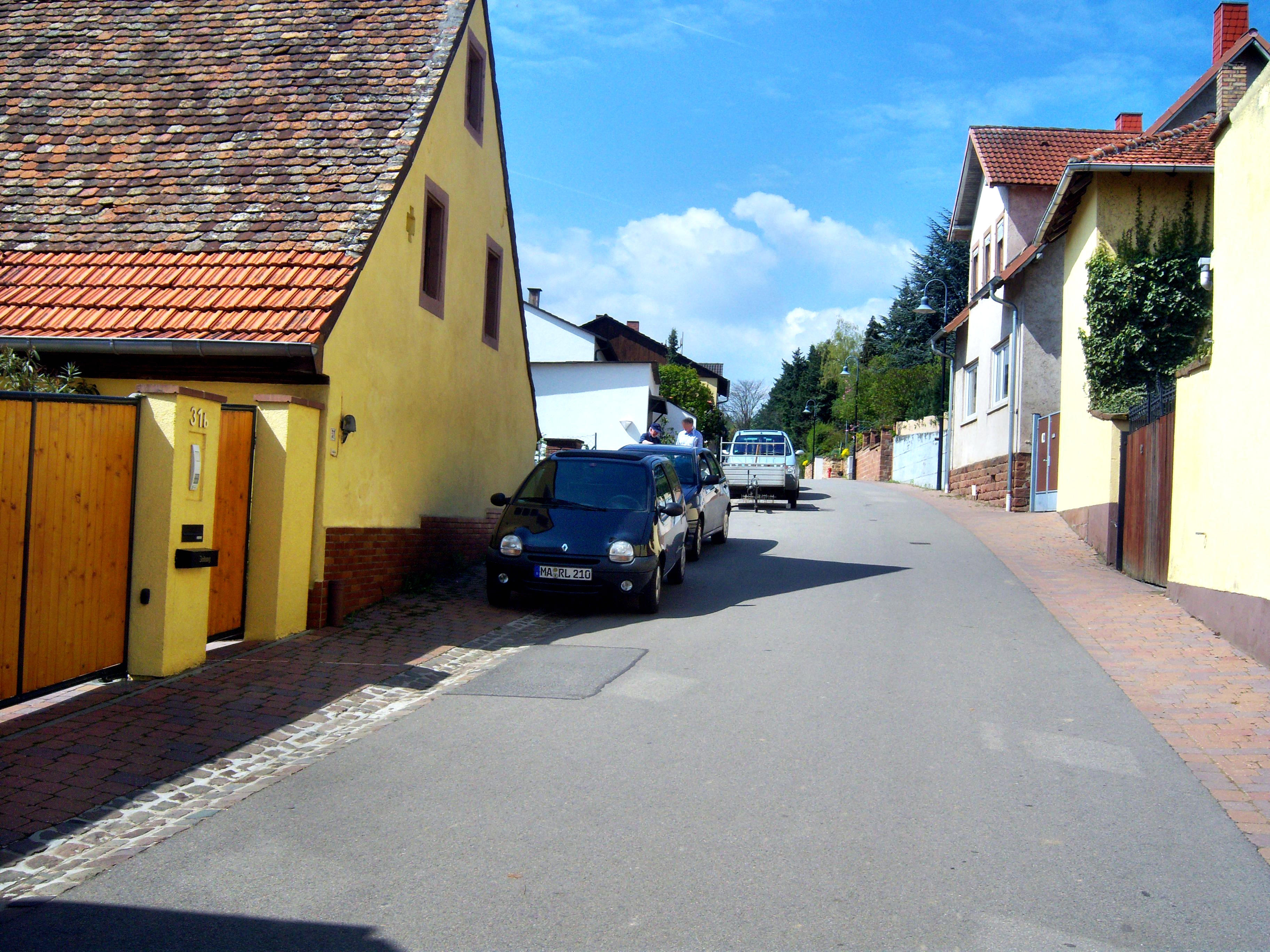
Battenberg's main street

The municipality lies in the Rhine-Neckar urban agglomeration on the seam between the Haardt and the Upper Rhine Plain. Standing together 300 m above sea level, high above the river Eckbach's banks are the small village and the like-named castle, Burg Battenberg, to the east. Battenberg belongs to the Verbandsgemeinde of Leiningerland, formed in 2018, whose seat is in Grünstadt, although that town is itself not in the Verbandsgemeinde.

== History ==
Battenberg Castle, which was owned since the Middle Ages by the Counts of Leiningen, to whom belonged the Leiningerland, controlled together with the other castle across the dale to the north (1 400 m away as the crow flies), Neuleiningen Castle, the entrance to the valley, the Eckbach valley. On 7 September 1966, the municipality was given the epithet “(Pfalz)”. Until 1969, the municipality belonged to the now abolished district of Frankenthal (Landkreis Frankenthal).

== Politics ==
=== Municipal council ===
The council is made up of 8 council members, who were elected by majority vote at the municipal election held on 7 June 2009, and the honorary mayor as chairman.

=== Coat of arms ===
The municipality's arms might be described thus: Per fess azure an eagle displayed wings elevated argent armed and langued gules, and argent a greyhound courant sinister sable.

Battenberg's arms developed out of the link between the Counts of Leiningen and Murbach Abbey in Alsace. The “greyhound” here is called the “Hound of Murbach” in the German blazon.

== See also ==
- Battenberg Castle
- House of Leiningen
- Battenberg, Hesse, the town linked with the name Mountbatten.
