= Trefa Banquet =

1883 dinner held in Cincinnati, Ohio, U.S.

The trefa or treyfa banquet was a dinner held on July 11, 1883, at the Highland House restaurant in Cincinnati, Ohio. Held in honor of the first graduating class of Hebrew Union College (including David Philipson, a major source on the event) and the delegates to the eighth annual meeting of the Union of American Hebrew Congregations, it offended a number of guests by featuring non-kosher (treyf) foods. It became symbolic of the growing divide within American Reform Judaism, which would eventually lead to the birth of Conservative Judaism.

== The meal ==
The dinner was held "in honor of the Delegates to the Council of the Union of American Hebrew Congregations". Although not stated in the menu, the banquet was also honoring the first four graduates of the Hebrew Union College, whose ordination was being held at the same time as the convention. There were about 215 attendees, who were greeted by "a dinner orchestra". The cost was defrayed by wealthy Jews ("Cincinnati's leading Jewish families"), at the head of whom was Julius Freiberg, the business partner and neighbor of Samuel Levy, the husband of a daughter of Jacob Ezekiel, who was Secretary of the Board of Hebrew Union College.

The meal, while eschewing pork, did not conform to Jewish dietary laws (kashrut). It included the prohibited (treif) foods clams, crabs, shrimp, and frogs' legs. It also combined meat with dairy dishes (ice cream). The meat was probably not kosher. This reflected the dining tendencies of Reform Jews at the time, who maintained the prohibition against pork but commonly ignored others, such as the one on shellfish.

The banquet received a long write-up in the Cincinnati Enquirer, under the title of "Jewish Jollification," which reproduced the menu completely, without comment, gave the program of the 12 numbers played by the orchestra (Brahms, Offenbach, von Suppé), and offered a long list of "the ladies present". In Rabbi Wise's American Israelite, the "collation" was "up to the standard"; besides a list of the ladies present, the article provides the texts of 7 toasts which were offered. The banquet was also mentioned briefly in discussions of the meeting of the Council of the Union of American Hebrew Congregations, which lasted three days (July 10–12).

== Reactions ==
An eyewitness (the last living attendee, David Philipson) wrote, almost sixty years later, that "terrific excitement ensued when two rabbis rose from their seats and rushed from the room. Shrimp had been placed before them as the opening course of the elaborate menu." If this is so, and his report has been described as "replete with misinformation" (among other things, shrimp was not the opening course), these rabbis did so quietly, without confrontation or protest. Another eyewitness, Henrietta Szold, commented in a letter, published in The Jewish Messenger on July 27, that the number who were indignant was "surprisingly small. ... Two rabbis left the table without having touched the dishes, and I am happy to state that I know of at least three more who ate nothing and were indignant but signified their disapproval in a less demonstrative manner."

The first known complaint, however, is from a non-attendee, Sabato Morais, who would become the first president of the Jewish Theological Seminary of America. In a letter to the editor of the American Hebrew dated July 16, he complains:

The outrage perpetrated at last week's banquet was not an unheard of occurrence among the Hebrew clergy of America.
On several occasions of a public character, men notably supposed to champion the Revealed Law, sat at tables laden with the flesh of animals whose vital blood remained therein, and with that of loathsome things which creep in ponds and on the ground. What made the Cincinnati entertainment in its audacious effrontery most humiliating to the cause and vexatious to believers, is the remarkable event which principally brought it about. ...
It is mortifying in the extreme, that the occasion in American Judaism which ought more especially to have gone down to posterity with the purest record, was stained by the unpardonable flippancy of a Hebrew Council, and the unrabbinical demeanor of American rabbis. It behooves the President of Union College to condemn what has evoked the remonstrances of the right-thinking.

Morais did not use the name "Trefa Banquet", and its first use is unknown.

Isaac Wise replied on August 3 to "our Philadelphia friend" (Morais) who "chastises the American Israelite because it did not condemn or at least denounce that terrible misdeed of that said unscrupulous caterer". Disclaiming responsibility for the menu, Wise added: "It is about time to stop that noise over the culinary department of Judaism. The American Hebrew's religion confers not in kitchen and stomach. The American Israelite begs to be excused, it does not deal in victuals."

"Word of the Trefa Banquet spread quickly throughout the Jewish press."

Our Jewish contemporaries seem to be a good deal exercised in mind over the menu of a dinner recently given by Cincinnati Israelites to visiting rabbis and laymen. The trouble is, it appears, that it included clams, frogs' legs and crabs. The American Hebrew speaks of these dishes as "the abomination of Talmud and Poskim", and wants to know whether the eleventh chapter of Leviticus is omitted from the edition of the Pentateuch in use in Cincinnati. The Jewish Record, Jewish Herald, Jewish Tribune, and Hebrew Standard are equally indignant. But, on the other band, the American Israelite affirms that not one of the 300 or 400 guests exhibited the slightest dissatisfaction.

The Jews of Cincinnati recently tendered a banquet to the Jewish ministers and laymen of that city at which many articles of diet forbidden by the Jewish ritual were served and eaten. Clams, soft-shell crabs and frog-legs were among the forbidden articles on the table. The affair has excited no end of comment and criticism on the part of Jewish journals. The Jewish Record says: "We coincide with those who censure this committee and all concerned in the affair. We doubt much if a society of Gentiles would not have paid more respect to a Jewish guest, than to set before him food which they know his religious convictions would not permit him to eat, as did this organization for the education of the Jewish rabbis." The Jewish Tribune calls it an "unmitigated disgrace." The Jewish Herald says: "The American Hebrew from its standpoint justly complains of the disregard to dietary laws at the Cincinnati banquet. The Jewish Herald in its leader warned the Cincinnatians in due time on that question." But, on the contrary, the American Israelite affirms that "Not a murmur, not a word of displeasure, not a sign of disappointment was observable among the 300 or 400 ladies and gentlemen who partook of the entertainment."

== Impact on American Judaism ==
Whether Rabbi Isaac Mayer Wise, the president of Hebrew Union College and leader of American Reform Judaism, was aware of the menu plans of the banquet committee is not known. "Determining Wise’s personal food policy is not easy. Frequently inconsistent, he readily changed or revised his views for opportunistic purposes." He declined to apologize and condemn the banquet, and instead dismissed "kitchen Judaism" and argued that the dietary laws were obsolete and cheapened the religion in the eyes of others.

A tradition that dates back to attendee Philipson credits outrage over the banquet as a key turning point in the path of Conservative Judaism later forming as an alternative to the larger Reform Judaism movement. It "furnished the opening to the movement that culminated in the establishment of a rabbinical seminary of a Conservative birth," as the Jewish Theological Seminary, founded shortly after the Trefa Banquet, eventually became the foundation of the Conservative movement.

"Kashrut was one of a cluster of interrelated issues that first caused a broad coalition of American Jewish traditionalists to withdraw from the Reform movement." After Wise's death the American Israelite said:

The often-repeated claim that the so-called 'trefa' banquet at Cincinnati was the cause of the withdrawal of the Eastern Orthodox congregations from the Union of American Hebrew Congregations is without any foundation in fact. They had become members of the Union most unwillingly, and the association with the congregations that held more modern views being most distasteful to them, they were looking almost from the very start for some pretext to at least excuse, if not justify, their withdrawal. This the 'trefa' banquet offered them, and it was seized upon with avidity.

== See also ==
- List of dining events
