= Julius Freiberg =

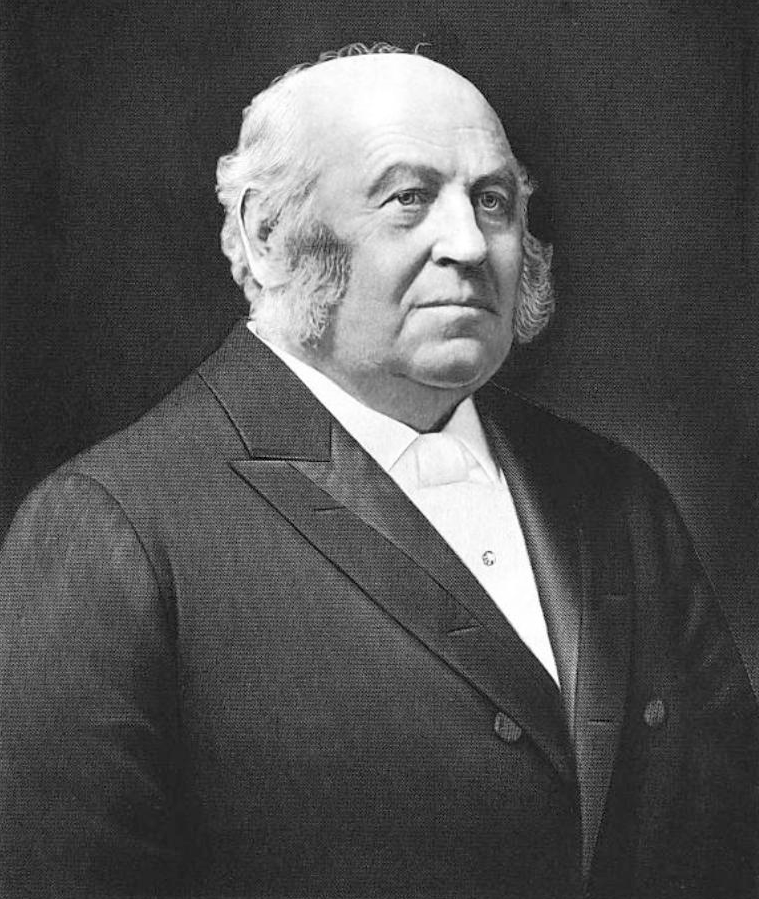
- Born: May 1, 1823; Neu Leiningen, Rhenish Bavaria
- Died: December 7, 1905 (aged 82); Cincinnati, Ohio, US
- Occupation: Distiller
- Spouse: Duffie Workum (m. 1856; died 1903)
- Children: 6

Signature
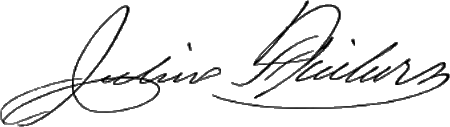

Julius Freiberg (May 1, 1823 – December 7, 1905) was a German-born Jewish-American distillery owner and communal leader.

== Life ==
Freiberg was born on May 1, 1823, in Neu Leiningen, Rhenish Bavaria, the son of Sigmund Freiberg.

Freiberg immigrated to America in 1847, initially working as a general merchant in Williamstown, Kentucky. While there, he met a number of distillers and learned that bourbon whiskey was barely known outside of the state at the time. He moved to Cincinnati, Ohio in 1852 and sold the first bourbon whiskey there for trade purposes. In Cincinnati, he initially manufactured vinegar. In 1855, he formed a distillery partnership with his brother-in-law Levi J. Workum called Freiberg and Workum. The business prospered and he became one of the leading men of the city. He was a member of the 1873 Ohio State Constitution Convention, having been nominated by both political parties. In 1894, he was elected an honorary member of the Cincinnati Chamber of Commerce. He was a trustee of the Sinking Fund of Cincinnati and a founder of Jewish Hospital, the Home for Jewish Aged and Infirm, and the Jewish Foster Home.

Freiberg joined Congregation Bene Israel within a year of arriving in Cincinnati. He served as the congregation's president from 1860 to 1862, 1867 to 1884, and 1889 to 1890. During his long second term as president, he helped increase the congregation's membership and finish the construction of a new building the congregation resided in for 37 years prior to moving to Avondale. Although he wasn't a member of Rabbi Isaac Mayer Wise's congregation, he was a major supporter of Wise's call to organize the Union of American Hebrew Congregations. When delegates to establish the Union assembled in Cincinnati in 1873, he delivered the welcoming address and was elected an executive board member. He was elected the Union's president in 1889, and served in that position until he retired in 1903 due to his poor health. When the Hebrew Union College was founded in 1875, he became a member and vice-president of its board of governors, serving there until his death.

On February 13, 1856, he married Duffie Workum, the first Jewish female child born west of the Allegheny Mountains. Their sons J. Walter and Maurice J. succeeded their father in the distillery business, and their daughters were Minnie (wife of Dr. Joseph Ransohoff), Sallie (wife of Edward S. Heinsheimer), Clara (wife of Jonas B. Frenkel), and Jeannette (wife of Albert H. Freiberg).

Freiberg died in Cincinnati on December 7, 1905.
