= Battenberg Castle =

- Burg Battenberg
- Battenberg (Palatinate)
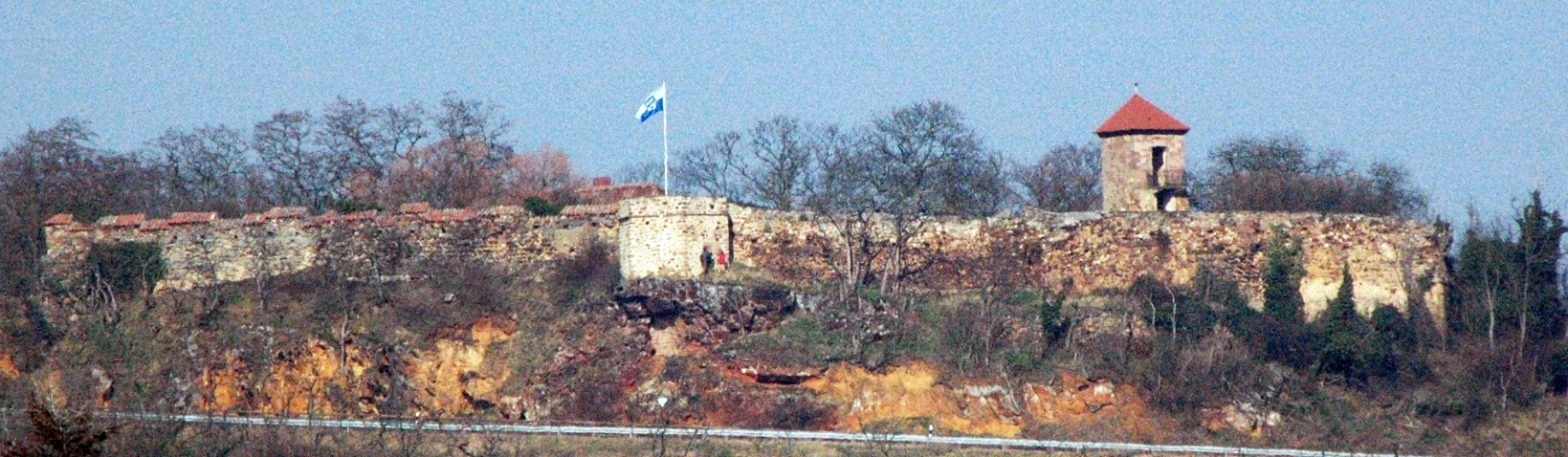
- Battenberg castle ruins seen from the south (2007)

Site information
- Type: hill castle, spur castle
- Code: DE-RP
- Condition: ruin

Location
- Coordinates: 49°31′56″N 8°08′41″E
- Height: 280 m above sea level (NN)

Site history
- Built: 13th century

Garrison information
- Occupants: counts

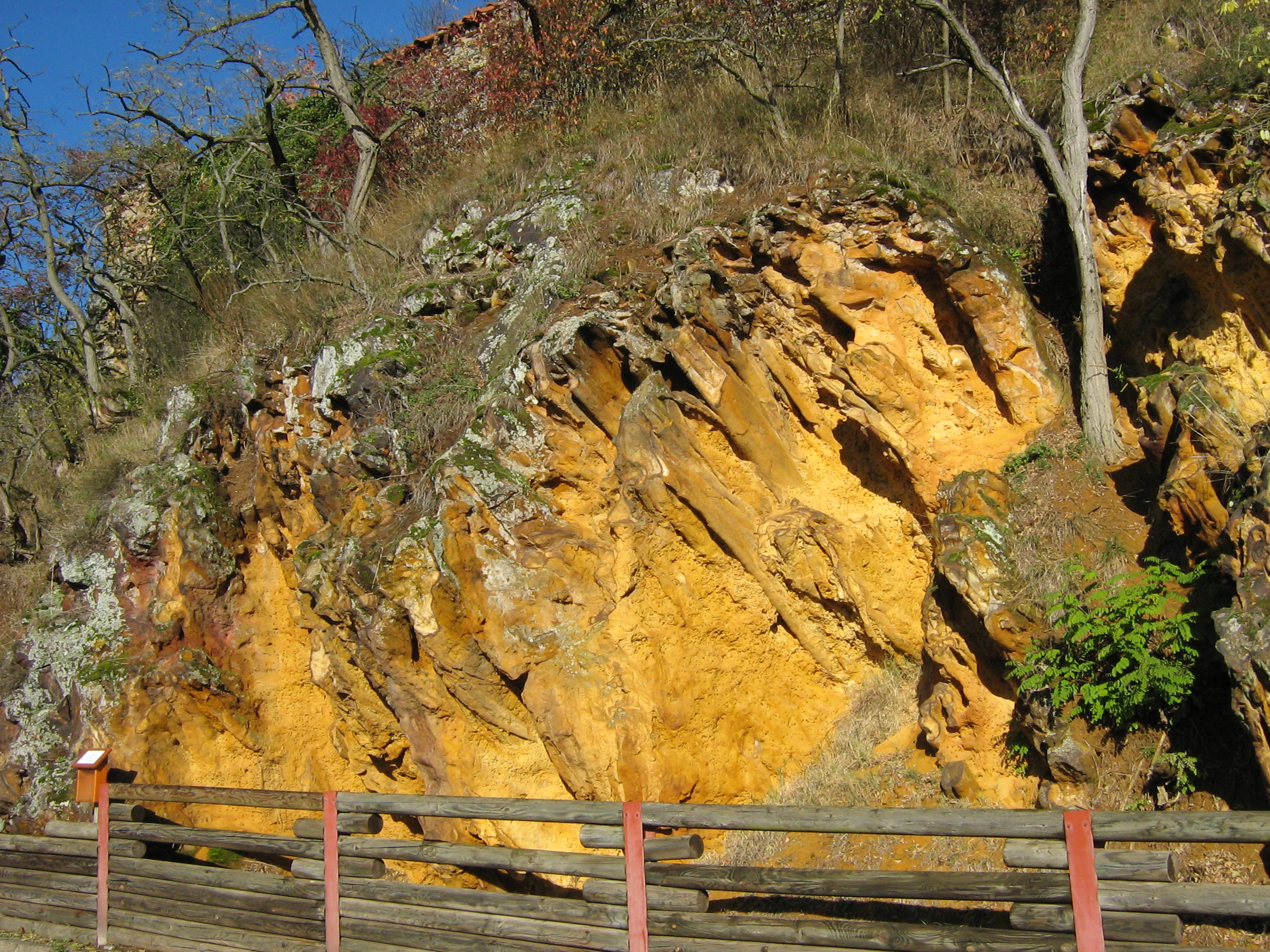
The Blitzröhren below the castle ruins

Battenberg Castle (German: Burg Battenberg) is a castle ruin near Battenberg in the county of Bad Dürkheim in the state of Rhineland-Palatinate, Germany.

== Location ==
The castle stands on a foothill of the Haardt range of sandstone hills which rises abruptly from the Rhine Plain on the north-eastern edge of the Palatinate Forest. Together with the small village of the same name, immediately to the west, it is 280 metres (920 ft) above sea level, above the right bank of the Eckbach stream.

Below the castle, by the ochre-coloured rocks bordering the winding approach road, the so-called Blitzröhren (literally "lightning pipes") reach the surface. These are not true fulgurites caused by lightning strikes, but columns of hard, iron-rich mineral exposed by erosion and sintering of the softer sandstone. The Haardtrand-Im Baumgarten nature reserve borders the eastern slopes of the castle hill.

== History ==
It is presumed that the castle was constructed by Count Frederick III of Leiningen (d. 1287), and it remained a possession of the House of Leiningen - until 1689, when it was destroyed during the War of the Palatine Succession by French troops. Together with Neuleiningen Castle, on the opposite hillside 1,400 metres (4,600 ft) metres to the north, it controlled access to the Eckbach valley. To the south-east, 5 kilometres (3 mi) upstream, stands the Leiningen family seat of Altleiningen.

== Layout ==
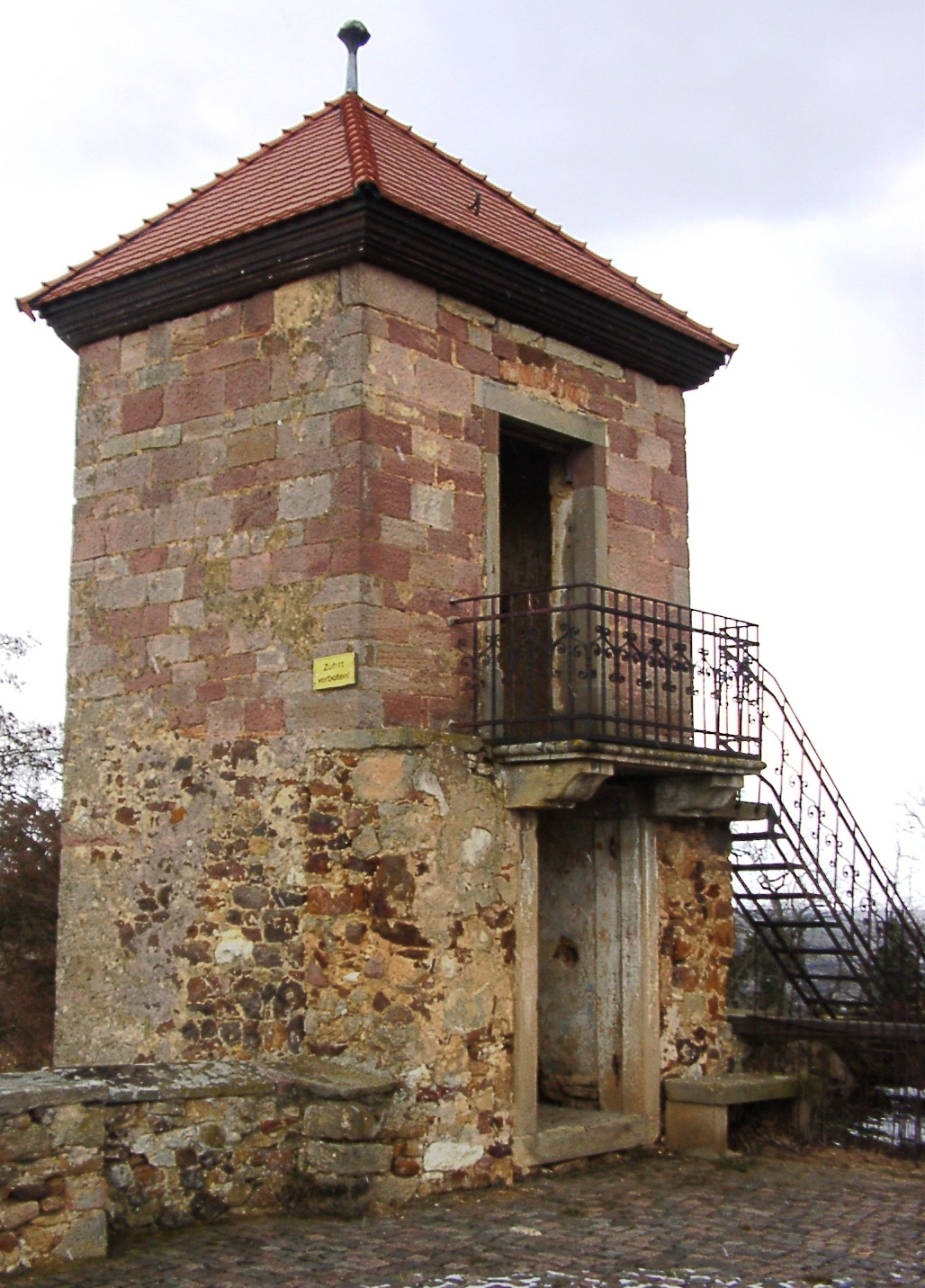
The staircase tower in 2005

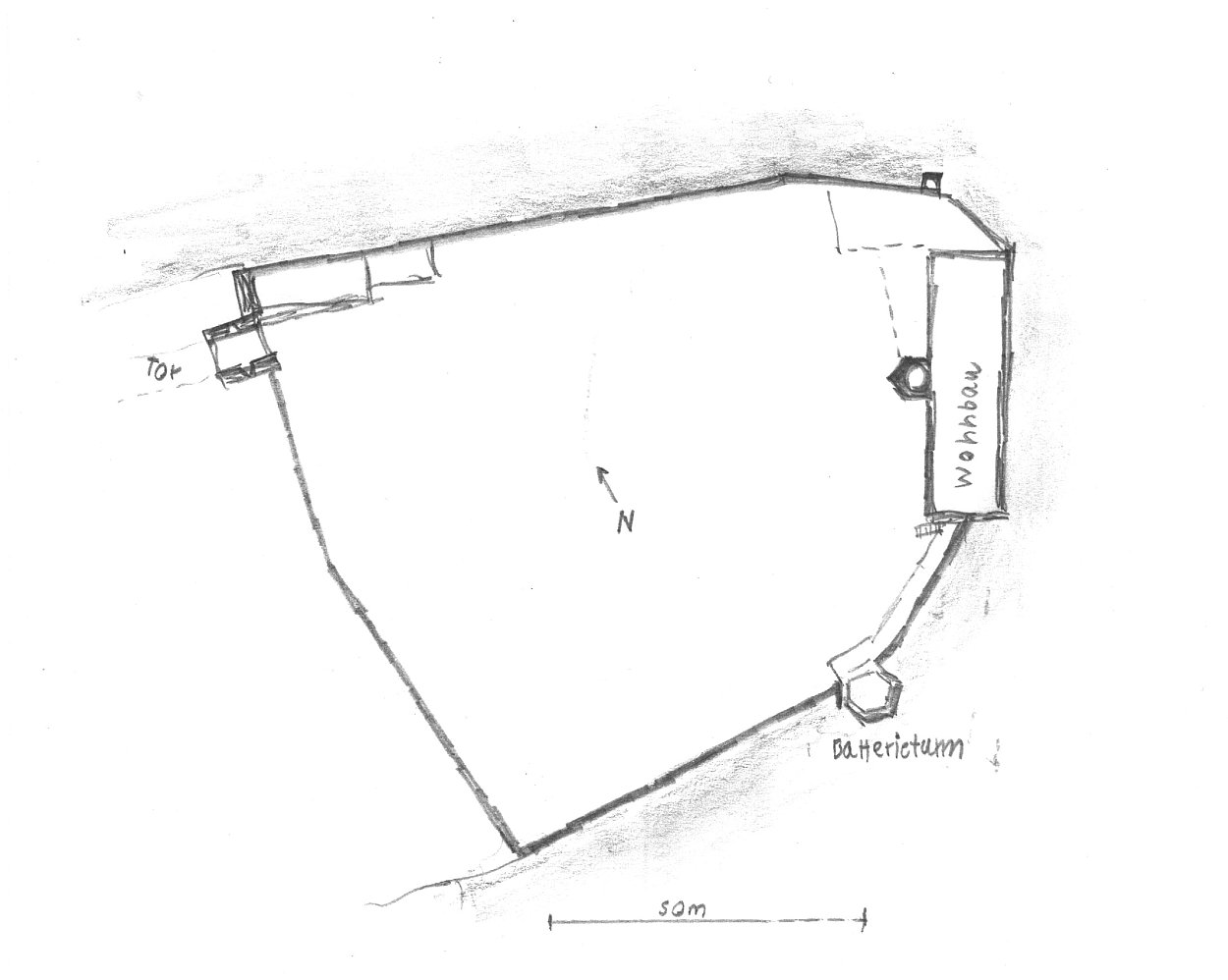
Plan of the castle

On three sides the outer walls of the castle follow the edge of the steep-sided hill spur. The wall on the fourth side was protected by a moat, now completely filled in. Surviving structures include: the outer walls, a gate tower on the western side near the northwest corner of the site, a battery tower with embrasure in the centre of the south side, and the vaulted cellar and foundations of a large dwelling. Attached to this is a staircase tower, erected in the 16th century, which is still standing.

The ruins are in private ownership but there is limited public access. A visit is repaid with views across the Rhine Plain, the Bergstrasse and the Odenwald.

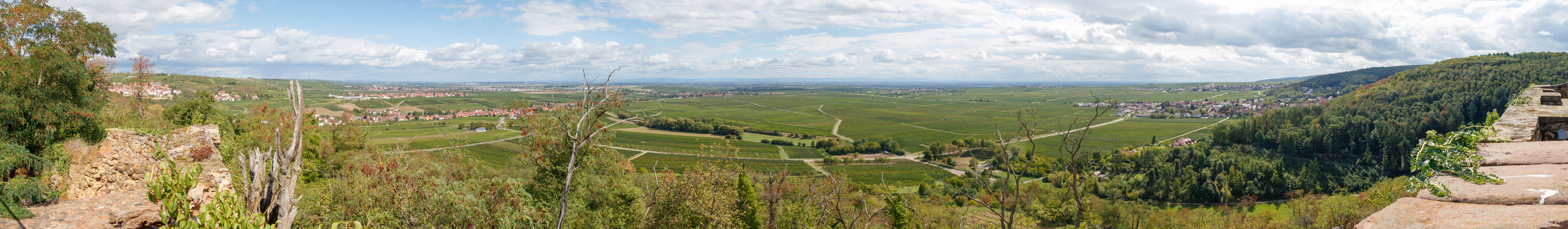
View of the Upper Rhine Plain from Battenberg Castle

== Literature ==
- Pfälzisches Burgenlexikon (in German), vol. Band 1: A–E (2. ed.), Kaiserslautern: Institut für pfälzische Geschichte und Volkskunde, 2003, pp. 212–218, ISBN 3-927754-51-X
