= Williamstown Independent School District =

School district in Kentucky, United States

Address
- 300 Helton St. Williamstown, Kentucky, 41097; United States

District information
- Motto: A Tradition of Excellence - Tomorrow's Legacy
- Grades: PreK-12
- Established: 1890
- Superintendent: John Slone
- Chair of the board: Angie Cleveland

Students and staff
- District mascot: Demons
- Colors: Orange and Black

Other information
- Website: http://www.williamstown.kyschools.us/

Williamstown Independent School District (WISD) is an independent school district located in the town of Williamstown, Kentucky, United States. The district consists of four schools, a headstart/preschool, an elementary school, a middle school, and a high school. All of the schools are in the same building at the same location. The district has been nominated as a top 5% school in the state of Kentucky.

Extracurriculars include basketball, baseball, volleyball, soccer, Academic team, golf, Esports, FCCLA, FFA, Yearbook, and many clubs.

== Administration ==
=== Board of education ===
The WISD is governed by five-member duly-elected Board of Education. The 2023 Members of the Board of Education included:

Williamstown Independent School District Board of Education
Position	Name
Board Chair	Angie Cleveland
Board Vice Chair	Chris Spivey
Board Member	Roy Osborne
Board Member	Chris Lawrence
Board Member	Kristie Willoby

== Schools ==
- Williamstown Elementary School
- Williamstown Junior High School
- Williamstown Senior High School
- Williamstown Head Start / Preschool

== Athletics ==
- Baseball
- Basketball (Boys & Girls)
- Cross Country (Boys & Girls)
- Golf
- Soccer
- Softball
- Tennis
- Track & Field (Boys & Girls)
- Volleyball
