= Williamstown, Kentucky =

- City
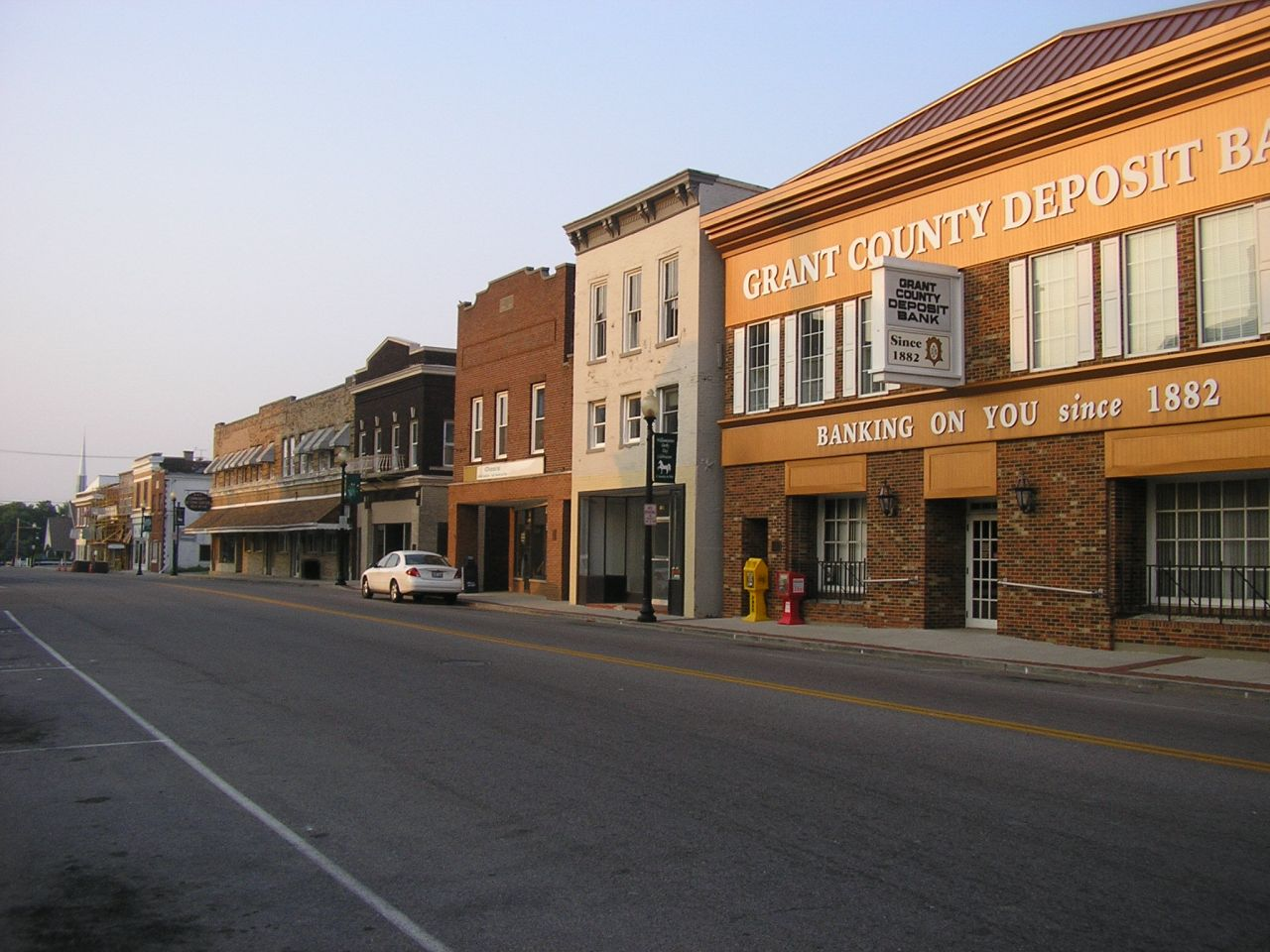
- Main Street in Williamstown

- Location of Williamstown in Grant County, Kentucky.
- Coordinates: 38°38′30″N 84°34′03″W
- Country: United States
- State: Kentucky
- Counties: Grant, Pendleton

Area
  - Total: 17.24 sq mi (44.64 km^{2})
  - Land: 16.71 sq mi (43.27 km^{2})
  - Water: 0.53 sq mi (1.37 km^{2})
- Elevation: 899 ft (274 m)

Population (2020)
  - Total: 3,894
  - Estimate (2024): 3,971
  - Density: 233.1/sq mi (89.99/km^{2})
- Time zone: UTC-5 (Eastern (EST))
  - Summer (DST): UTC-4 (EDT)
- ZIP code: 41097
- Area code: 859
- FIPS code: 21-83406
- GNIS feature ID: 2405749
- Website: wtownky.org

Williamstown is a home-rule-class city in Grant and Pendleton counties in the U.S. state of Kentucky. As of the 2020 census, Williamstown had a population of 3,894. It is the county seat of Grant County.

== History ==
When Grant County was formed in 1820, William Arnold offered land for the county seat. Arnold was a veteran of the Revolutionary War and settled in the area in 1795. The town built there was named after him when it incorporated in 1825.

The county grew slowly, reaching a population of just 281 by 1870. The Cincinnati Southern Railway was built through the county in 1877, and Williamstown Lake was created in 1957. Finally, Interstate 75 was built in the 1960s.

Since 2016, Williamstown is home to Ark Encounter theme park with its newly built Noah's Ark.

== Geography ==
Williamstown is located east of the center of Grant County. It is bordered to the north by the city of Dry Ridge. The city limits extend northeast 5 miles (8 km) along Falmouth Road and East Fairview Road to slightly enter Pendleton County. Interstate 75 passes through the west side of the city, with access from Exits 154 and 156. I-75 leads north 37 miles (60 km) to Cincinnati and south 45 miles (72 km) to Lexington. U.S. Route 25 passes through the center of Williamstown as Main Street; US 25 leads north 11 miles (18 km) to Crittenden and south the same distance to Corinth.

According to the United States Census Bureau, Williamstown has a total area of 16.9 square miles (43.9 km^{2}), of which 16.4 square miles (42.6 km^{2}) is land and 0.54 square miles (1.4 km^{2}), or 3.13%, is water. Williamstown Lake, a reservoir on the South Fork of Grassy Creek, is in the northeast part of the city.

=== Climate ===
The climate in this area is characterized by hot, humid summers and generally mild to cool winters. According to the Köppen Climate Classification system, Williamstown has a humid subtropical climate, abbreviated "Cfa" on climate maps.

Climate data for Williamstown, Kentucky (1991–2020)
Month	Jan	Feb	Mar	Apr	May	Jun	Jul	Aug	Sep	Oct	Nov	Dec	Year
Mean daily maximum °F (°C)	41.9 (5.5)	47.0 (8.3)	55.9 (13.3)	68.1 (20.1)	76.5 (24.7)	83.4 (28.6)	87.1 (30.6)	86.0 (30.0)	81.1 (27.3)	69.8 (21.0)	56.2 (13.4)	45.5 (7.5)	66.5 (19.2)
Daily mean °F (°C)	33.4 (0.8)	37.5 (3.1)	45.6 (7.6)	56.7 (13.7)	65.7 (18.7)	73.0 (22.8)	76.7 (24.8)	75.5 (24.2)	69.7 (20.9)	58.5 (14.7)	46.7 (8.2)	37.4 (3.0)	56.4 (13.5)
Mean daily minimum °F (°C)	25.0 (−3.9)	27.9 (−2.3)	35.3 (1.8)	45.2 (7.3)	54.9 (12.7)	62.6 (17.0)	66.3 (19.1)	65.0 (18.3)	58.4 (14.7)	47.2 (8.4)	37.2 (2.9)	29.2 (−1.6)	46.2 (7.9)
Average precipitation inches (mm)	3.12 (79)	3.26 (83)	4.34 (110)	4.14 (105)	4.87 (124)	4.99 (127)	3.82 (97)	3.80 (97)	3.46 (88)	3.00 (76)	3.55 (90)	3.51 (89)	45.86 (1,165)
Average snowfall inches (cm)	6.7 (17)	4.1 (10)	1.7 (4.3)	0.1 (0.25)	0.0 (0.0)	0.0 (0.0)	0.0 (0.0)	0.0 (0.0)	0.0 (0.0)	0.2 (0.51)	0.4 (1.0)	2.8 (7.1)	16 (40.16)
Source: NOAA

== Demographics ==
Historical population
Census	Pop.	Note	%±
1830	197		—
1850	317		—
1860	256		−19.2%
1870	281		9.8%
1880	751		167.3%
1890	573		−23.7%
1900	613		7.0%
1910	800		30.5%
1920	836		4.5%
1930	917		9.7%
1940	1,077		17.4%
1950	1,466		36.1%
1960	1,611		9.9%
1970	2,063		28.1%
1980	2,502		21.3%
1990	3,023		20.8%
2000	3,227		6.7%
2010	3,925		21.6%
2020	3,894		−0.8%
2024 (est.)	3,971		2.0%
U.S. Decennial Census

=== 2020 census ===
As of the 2020 census, Williamstown had a population of 3,894. The median age was 36.0 years. 26.5% of residents were under the age of 18 and 15.1% of residents were 65 years of age or older. For every 100 females there were 95.8 males, and for every 100 females age 18 and over there were 95.2 males age 18 and over.

0.0% of residents lived in urban areas, while 100.0% lived in rural areas.

There were 1,337 households in Williamstown, of which 38.4% had children under the age of 18 living in them. Of all households, 45.0% were married-couple households, 16.1% were households with a male householder and no spouse or partner present, and 30.2% were households with a female householder and no spouse or partner present. About 26.6% of all households were made up of individuals and 12.2% had someone living alone who was 65 years of age or older.

There were 1,527 housing units, of which 12.4% were vacant. The homeowner vacancy rate was 2.6% and the rental vacancy rate was 5.4%.

Racial composition as of the 2020 census
Race	Number	Percent
White	3,570	91.7%
Black or African American	45	1.2%
American Indian and Alaska Native	3	0.1%
Asian	12	0.3%
Native Hawaiian and Other Pacific Islander	2	0.1%
Some other race	47	1.2%
Two or more races	215	5.5%
Hispanic or Latino (of any race)	121	3.1%

=== 2010 census ===
As of the 2010 census, there were 3,925 people, 1,279 households, and 879 families residing in the city. The population density was 202.2 inhabitants per square mile (78.1/km^{2}). There were 1,375 housing units at an average density of 86.2 units per square mile (33.3 units/km^{2}). The racial makeup of the city was 95.72% White, 1.78% African American, 0.25% Native American, 0.18% Asian, 0.36% Pacific Islander, 0.99% from other races, and 0.71% from two or more races. Hispanic or Latino of any race were 1.46% of the population.

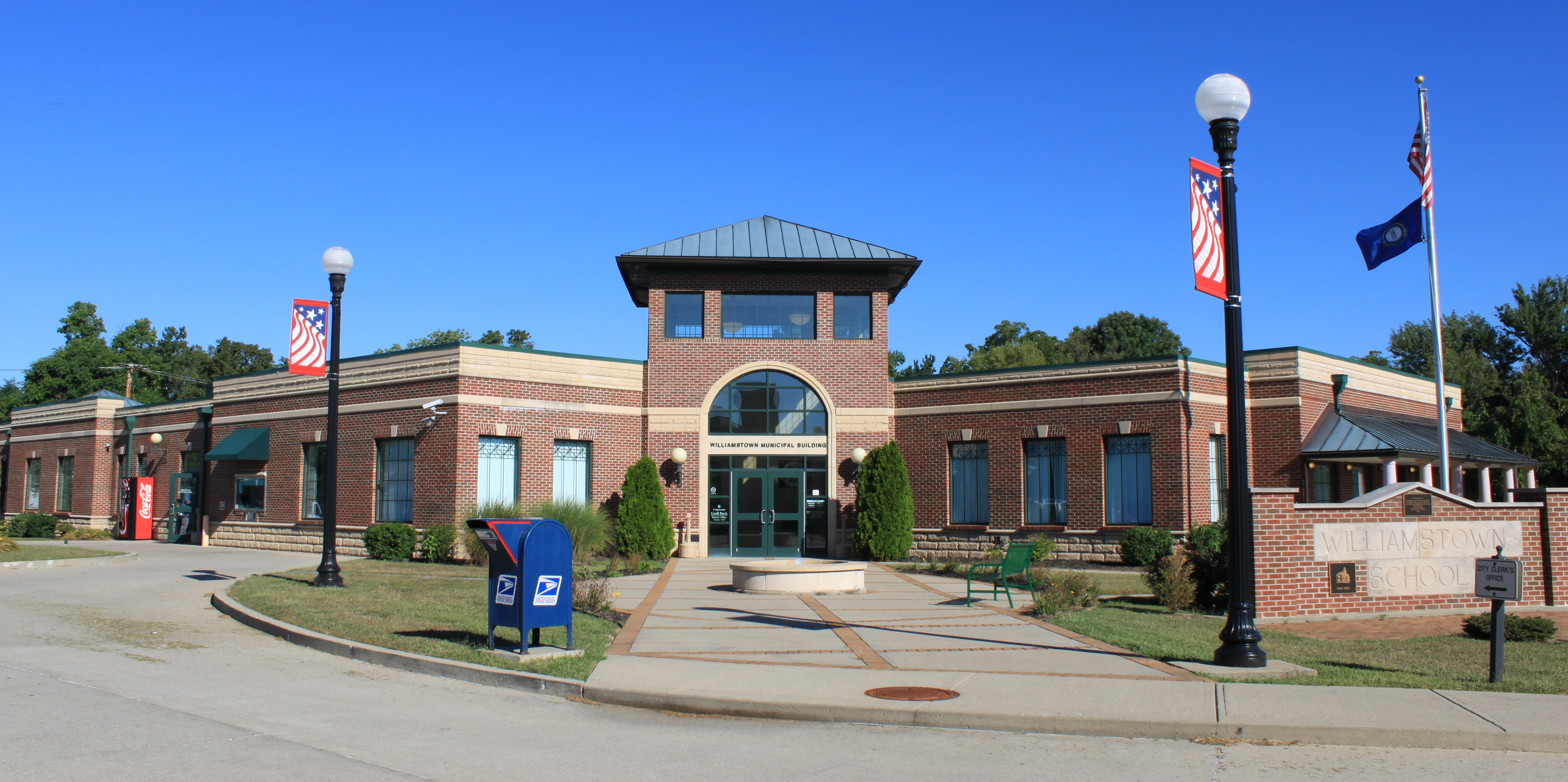
Williamstown Municipal Building

There were 1,279 households, out of which 32.0% had children under the age of 18 living with them, 52.3% were married couples living together, 13.1% had a female householder with no husband present, and 31.2% were non-families. 28.4% of all households were made up of individuals, and 15.9% had someone living alone who was 65 years of age or older. The average household size was 2.45 and the average family size was 2.98.

In the city, the population was spread out, with 25.8% under the age of 18, 8.5% from 18 to 24, 28.6% from 25 to 44, 20.4% from 45 to 64, and 16.6% who were 65 years of age or older. The median age was 35 years. For every 100 females, there were 85.5 males. For every 100 females age 18 and over, there were 82.3 males.

The median income for a household in the city was $33,750, and the median income for a family was $44,808. Males had a median income of $31,466 versus $21,492 for females. The per capita income for the city was $17,945. About 10.9% of families and 15.4% of the population were below the poverty line, including 16.1% of those under age 18 and 20.1% of those age 65 or over.

== Education ==
Williamstown has a lending library, the Grant County Public Library. The city is served by both the Grant County School District and the Williamstown Independent School District.

== Economy ==
Ark Encounter is a Christian theme park with a full-scale interpretation of Noah's Ark, operated by Answers in Genesis.

== Notable people ==
- Julius Freiberg, brewer
- Rodney McMullen, CEO of Kroger
- Arnie Risen, basketball player, member of the Basketball Hall of Fame
- Doc Sechrist, baseball player
- Harry Westover, United States federal judge
