= Williamstown Lake =

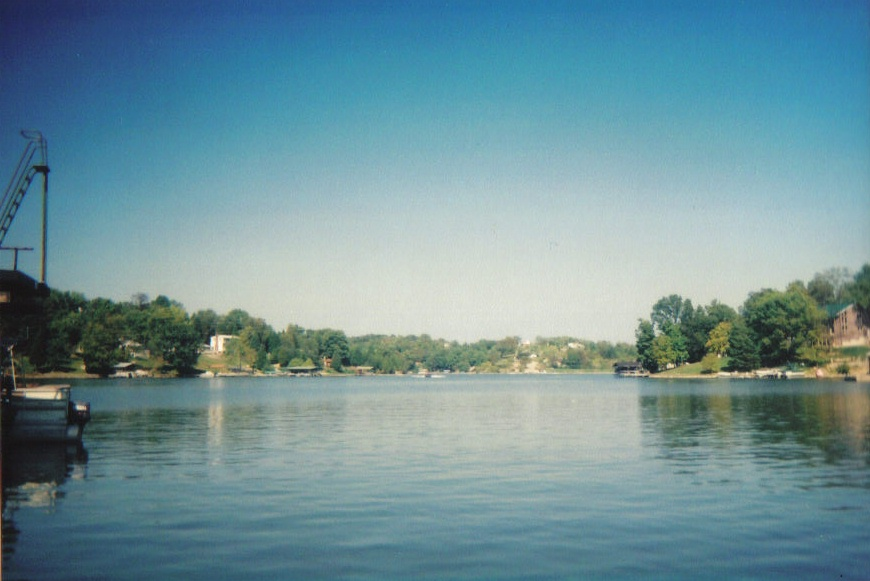

- Location within Kentucky
- Location: Grant County, Kentucky
- Coordinates: 38°40′20″N 84°31′40″W
- Type: reservoir
- Primary outflows: South Fork Grassy Creek
- Basin countries: United States
- Surface area: 300 acres (1.2 km^{2})
- Average depth: 21 ft (6.4 m)
- Max. depth: 70 ft (21 m)
- Surface elevation: 785 feet (239 m)

Williamstown Lake is a public 365-acre (1.48 km^{2}) recreational lake and water reservoir in Grant County, Kentucky. It was created in 1955 by impounding the South Fork of Grassy Creek in order to supply the community with water as the existing reservoir, now the centerpiece of nearby JB Miller Park was unable to keep up with demand. The lake officially opened for boating, fishing and swimming in 1957 by utilizing one access point adjacent the City of Dry Ridge and one adjacent to the City of Williamstown. With more than 365 surface acres of water including seasonable accessible tributaries, just over 7 miles from end to end and 28 miles of shoreline, the lake has attracted well over 300 summer cottages and year-round homes which line nearly every originally available plot on the lake.

The lake is owned and operated by the City of Williamstown as they are charged with maintaining the structural source of the lake which is the Dam and Spillway located at the Eastern end. The city is the only entity legally allowed to remove and sell water from the lake to surrounding communities.

There are two main boat ramps available for launch: The Williamstown Marina is a public access point with a modest launch fee which has fuel, a small convenience store, Dockside Pizza and Pub (seasonal) restaurant and another now known as Lemons Landing (formerly Ruby's Boat Dock) which is subscription based with no public parking.

Issues surrounding Williamstown Lake include the continuous development of local properties, often concerning but closely monitored levels of sewage in the water due to improperly installed and "grandfathered" systems incapable of handling the new developments and additions, and the Williamstown Lake Expansion Project and nearby development of the Ark Encounter attraction. The Expansion Project has been stalled for more than three decades due to the project merging into adjacent Pendleton county and is/would be projected to triple the size of the lake in order to increase the supply of safe water in the surrounding areas but issues remain in water ownership and distribution rights, among other issues of property acquisition and protected native biological species.

Restrictions imposed by Williamstown City Council in 2021 due to heavy recreational use of the lake are as follows:

- No person shall operate a personal watercraft or motorboat when towing a person on any conveyance behind the watercraft using a tow rope of 30 feet or less, as measured by the transom of the boat to the end of the top rope.
- No Wake Zones shall be marked in all designated areas of Williamstown Lake with buoys, signs and other visible markers marking designated areas or No Wake Zones in cove areas. While operating in these areas it is prohibited to operate any vehicle at a speed greater than five miles per hour and in no case create a white cap in a No Wake Zone.
- A 40 mile-per-hour speed limit.
- Wake Surfing is not permitted at any time on the lake but wake boarding is be permitted except with the use of a ballast/bladder system.
