= Neuleiningen Castle =

Ruined castle in Germany

- Burg Neuleiningen
- Neuleiningen
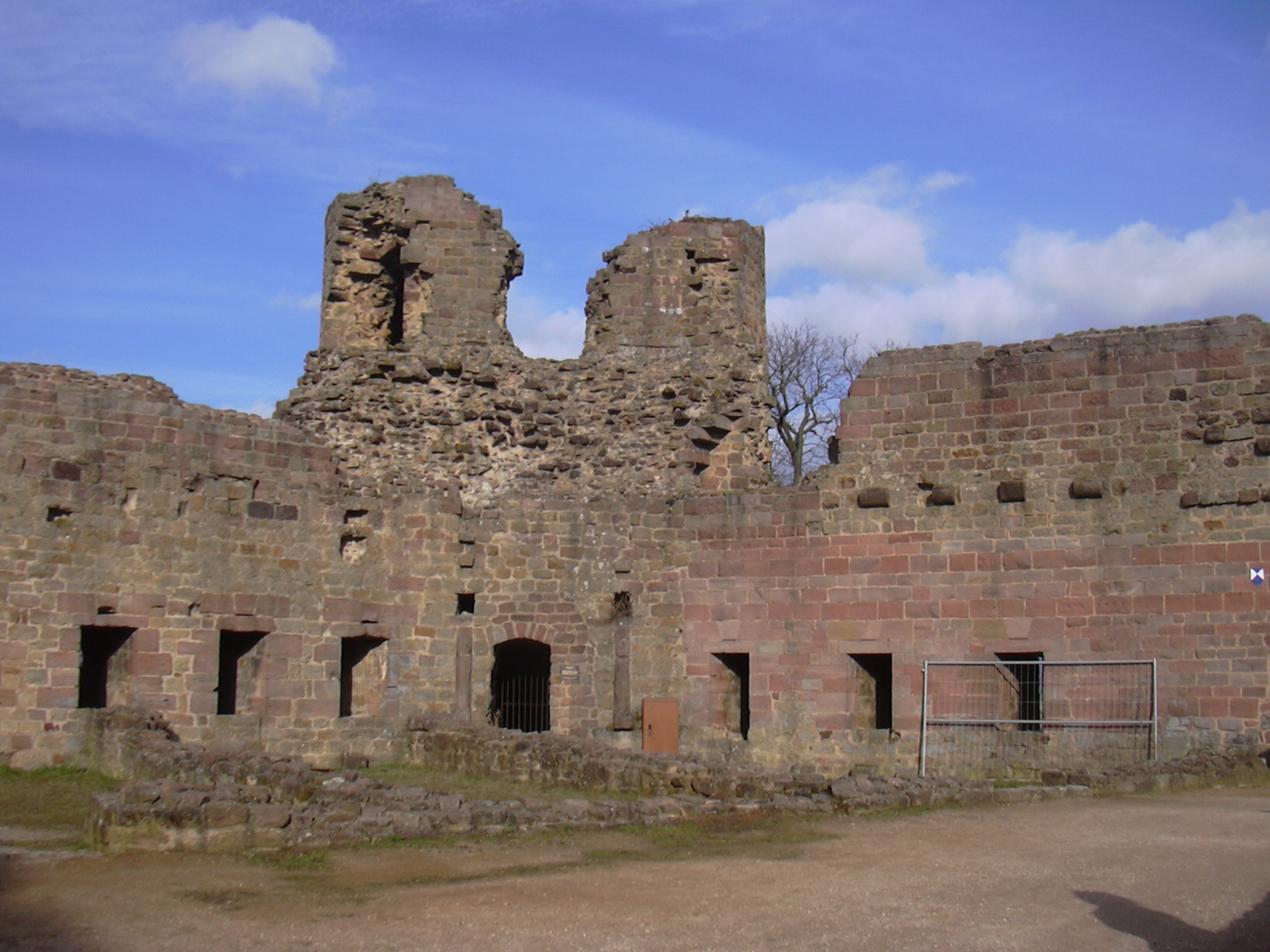
- Northeast defensive tower (bergfried) of Neuleiningen Castle

Site information
- Type: hill castle
- Code: DE-RP
- Condition: ruin

Location
- Coordinates: 49°32′34″N 8°08′23″E
- Height: 300 m above sea level (NN)

Site history
- Built: around 1240

Garrison information
- Occupants: counts

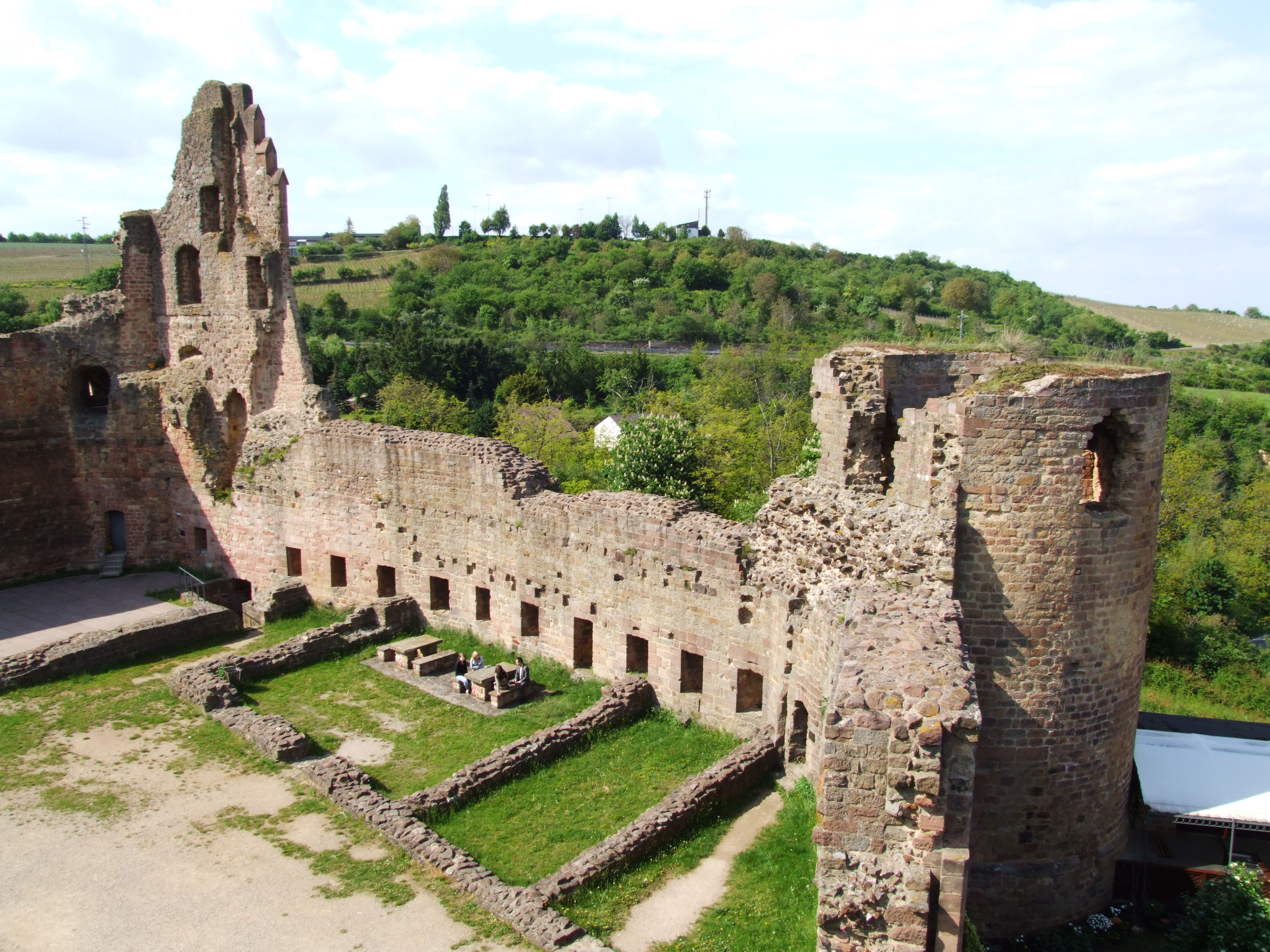
Neuleiningen Castle, north side

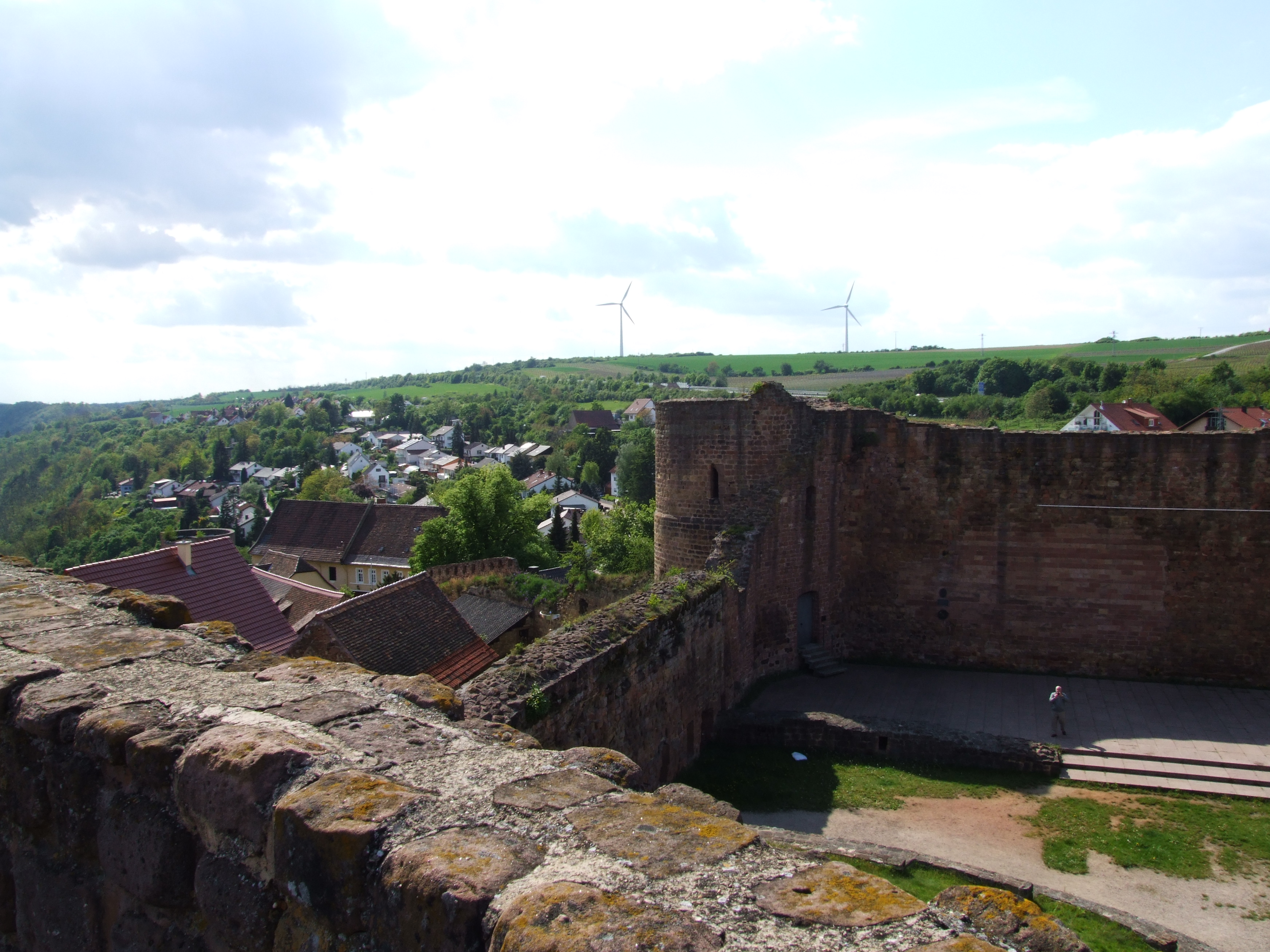
Neuleiningen Castle looking south

Neuleiningen Castle is a ruin on the eastern edge of the Palatinate Forest in the state of Rhineland-Palatinate in Germany in the municipality of Neuleiningen in the Bad Dürkheim district. It was built in 1238-41 by Count Frederick III of Leiningen. The French destroyed it in 1690 and it has lain in ruins since that time.

== Location ==
The castle is located on a foothill of the Haardt on the northeastern edge of the Palatinate Forest. Its eponymous village is grouped around the castle, high above the left bank of the Eckbach at an elevation of about 300 metres above sea level.

Near the castle is the Old Vicarage (Alte Pfarrey), which was first recorded in 1524 and which houses a gourmet restaurant today.

== History ==
Its name, like that of its sister castle, Altleiningen five kilometres to the southwest, is derived from the Frankish noble family, the counts of Leiningen, who ruled the territory of Leiningerland.

The castle was built following a division of inheritance around 1240 by Count Frederick III of Leiningen. Together with, Battenberg Castle, 1,400 metres to the south, the castle controlled the entrance to the Eckbach valley. Passing between various lines of the family, the castle remained the property of the Leiningens for over 200 years. In 1468, Prince-Elector Frederick the Victorious of the Palatinate became involved in inheritance disputes amongst the Leiningens and seized possession of the castle by force. In 1508, after passing through several intermediate arrangements, an agreement was reached: the castle would be divided between the Bishopric of Worms and the counts of Leiningen-Westerburg.

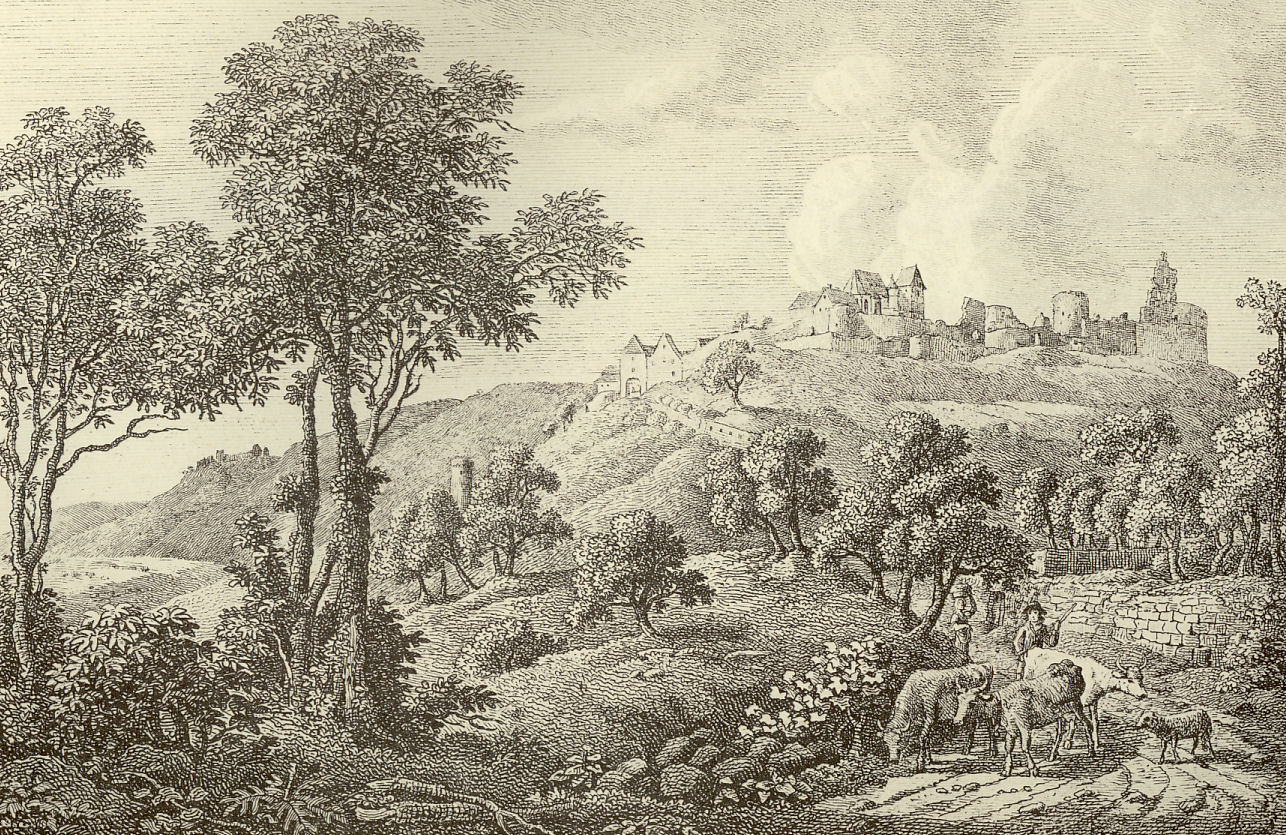
The ruins around 1800, copperplate by Jakob Wilhelm Roux

In 1525, during the Peasants' War, the castle was opened to the rebellious farmers without a fight and, having been hosted by Countess Eva (1481–1543) in a friendly and generous way, the farmers left without causing great damage. Local poet, Paul Münch, described this historical episode in his Palatine poem Die Gräfin Eva vun Neileininge. Even in Thirty Years' War the castle only suffered minor damage.

During the War of the Palatine Succession, however, invading French troops razed the entire site in 1690. Its two owners, Leiningen-Westerburg and the Bishopric of Worms, could not agree to rebuild the castle in the period that followed – Leiningen being for, and Worms being against, the idea. In 1767, Charles of Leiningen-Westerburg finally sold the Leiningen half to Worms.

In the wake of the French Revolution the castle ruins were seized by secular authorities and passed in 1804 into the hands of the municipality of Neuleiningen, who, sold it just four years. In 1874, Charles Emich of Leiningen-Westerburg bought it back again for his family.

== Layout ==
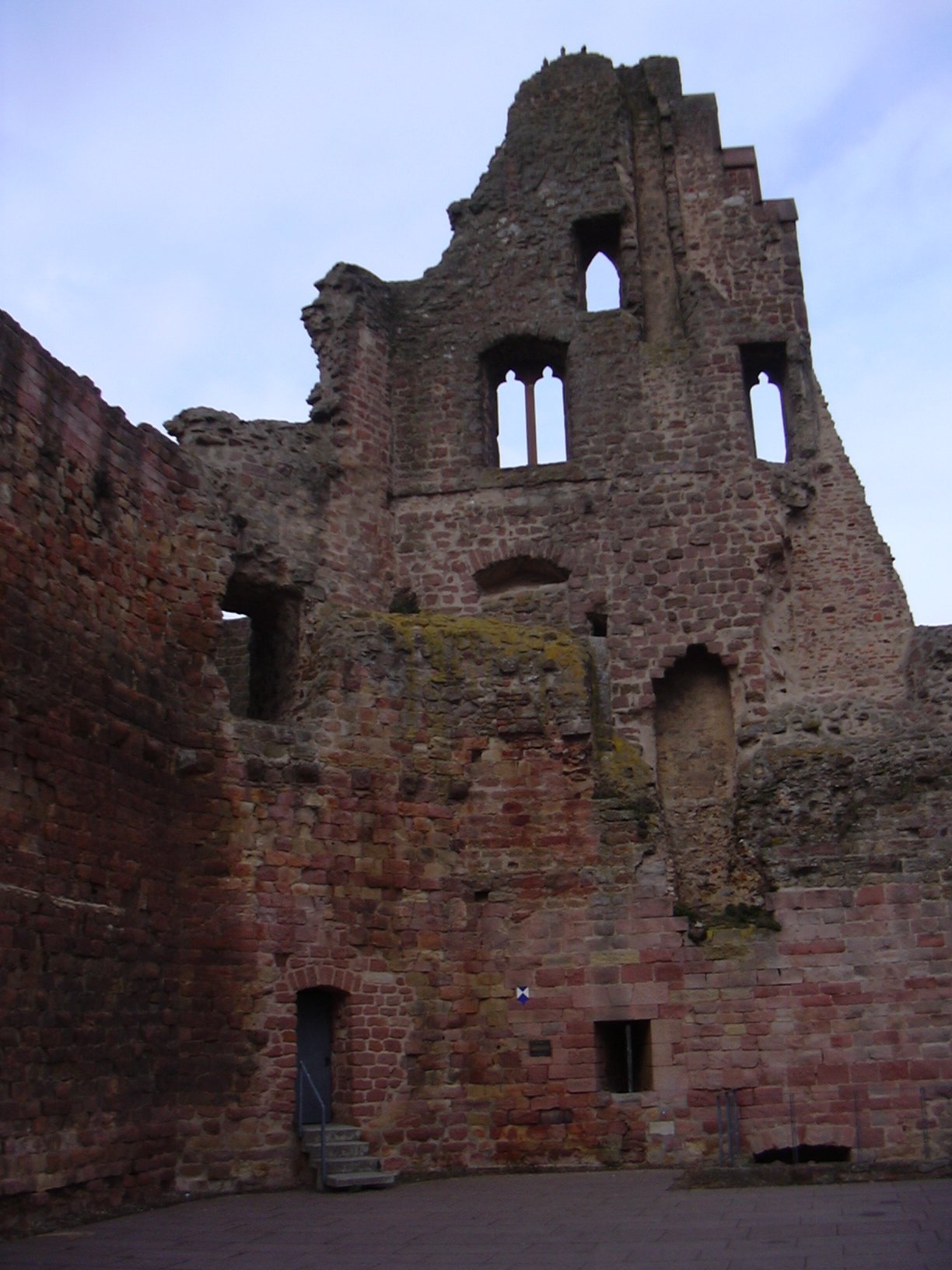
The stepped gable of the palas in the northwest corner of the castle

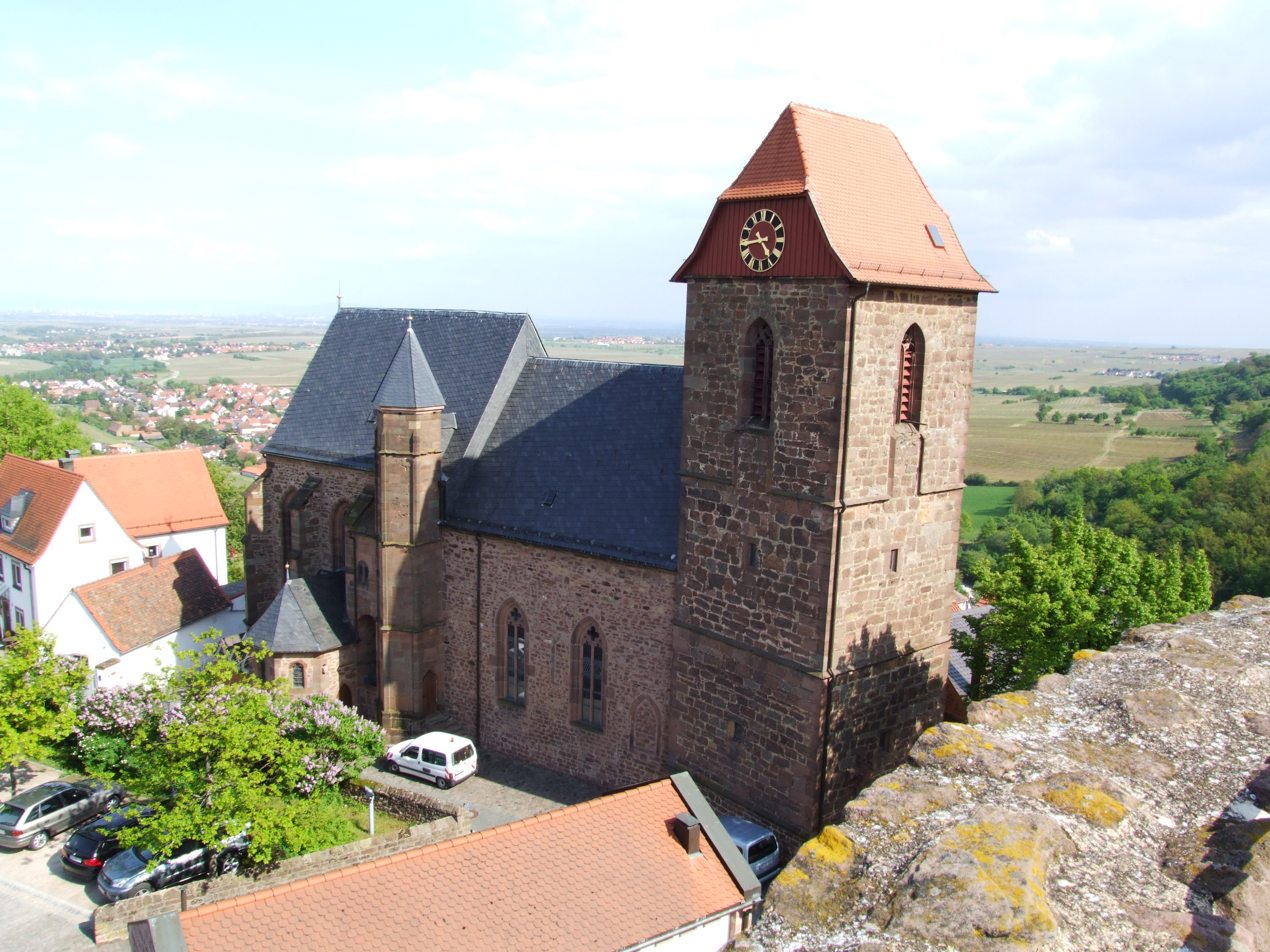
Parish church of St. Nicholas, the old castle chapel, seen from the castle.

The castle is of the so-called quadrangular type, with a rectangular ground plan and defensive towers projecting beyond the curtain walls. Contrary to earlier views, the castle was built to the same pattern as French castles of the early 13th century in the Île-de-France. However, its design was not copied from an existing castle; rather it combined a French design with local building traditions. Most striking are its four, round towers and the large number of very narrow arrow slits (Schlitzscharten), for bows and crossbows. These Schlitzscharten are amongst the earliest examples on German soil. Thus, apart from Lahr Castle - of which little remains - Neuleiningen is the oldest quadrangular castle in Germany.

The internal elements from the first phase of construction have been totally lost and can only be made out here and there from excavations. The present remains date to the 14th to early 17th centuries. The most striking feature of the castle is the stepped gable of the palas on the north side which, in its present guise, goes back to Landgrave Hesso of Leiningen (before 1435–1467). In the southeast corner the cellar of the Leiningen-Westerburg residence of around 1508 has survived. This is where the Burgschänke inn was established in the second half of the 20th century.

Today, the southeast tower is an observation tower that is open to the public. The two upper storeys of this tower have been turned into a small local history museum that exhibits the stoneware products of an old local factory that closed in 1932, as well as other handicrafts.

The local village, which is connected to the castle both geographically and historically, was built around the same time (13th century). The coherence and extent of its historic buildings has only a few parallels in the region.

== Sights and culture ==
=== Viewing point ===
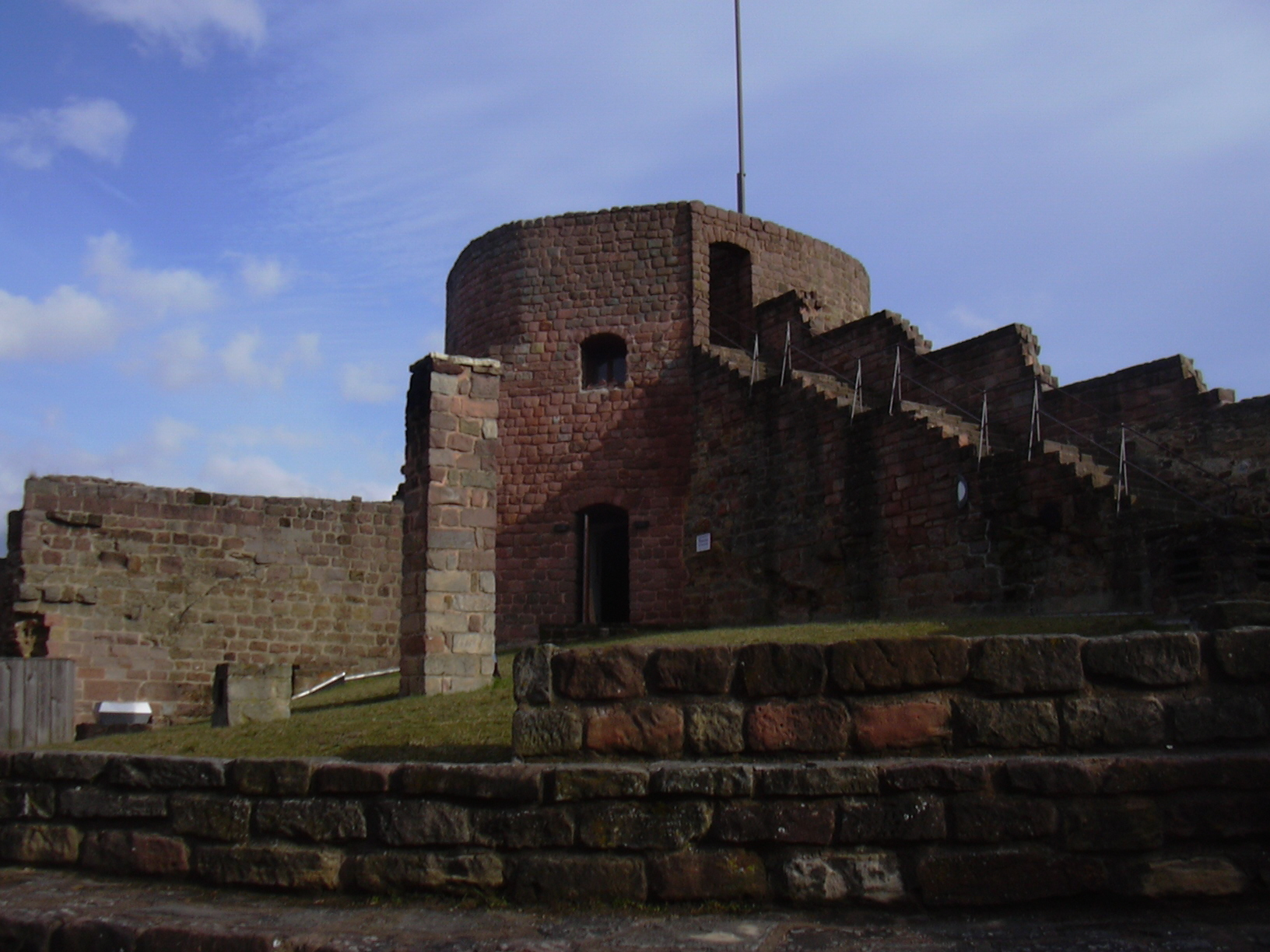
The Southeast Tower; today a viewing point

From the observation tower of the castle there is an outstanding view of the Upper Rhine Valley to the east, the mountains of the Palatinate Forest to the south and west and the massif of the Donnersberg to the northwest. At the foot of the hill village of Neuleiningen is the hamlet of Neuleiningen-Tal and the neighbouring villages of Grünstadt-Sausenheim and Kleinkarlbach. In clear weather, there are views of Ludwigshafen, Mannheim, and the Odenwald, and planes may even be seen taking off from Frankfurt Airport.

Conversely, at night, the illuminated castle is an impressive sight from the A 6 motorway (Saarbrücken–Mannheim) immediately to the north. In the direction of Mannheim it appears against the backdrop of the densely populated Rhine valley whilst, 20 km behind the castle silhouette, is the well-lit BASF factory in Ludwigshafen.

=== Events ===
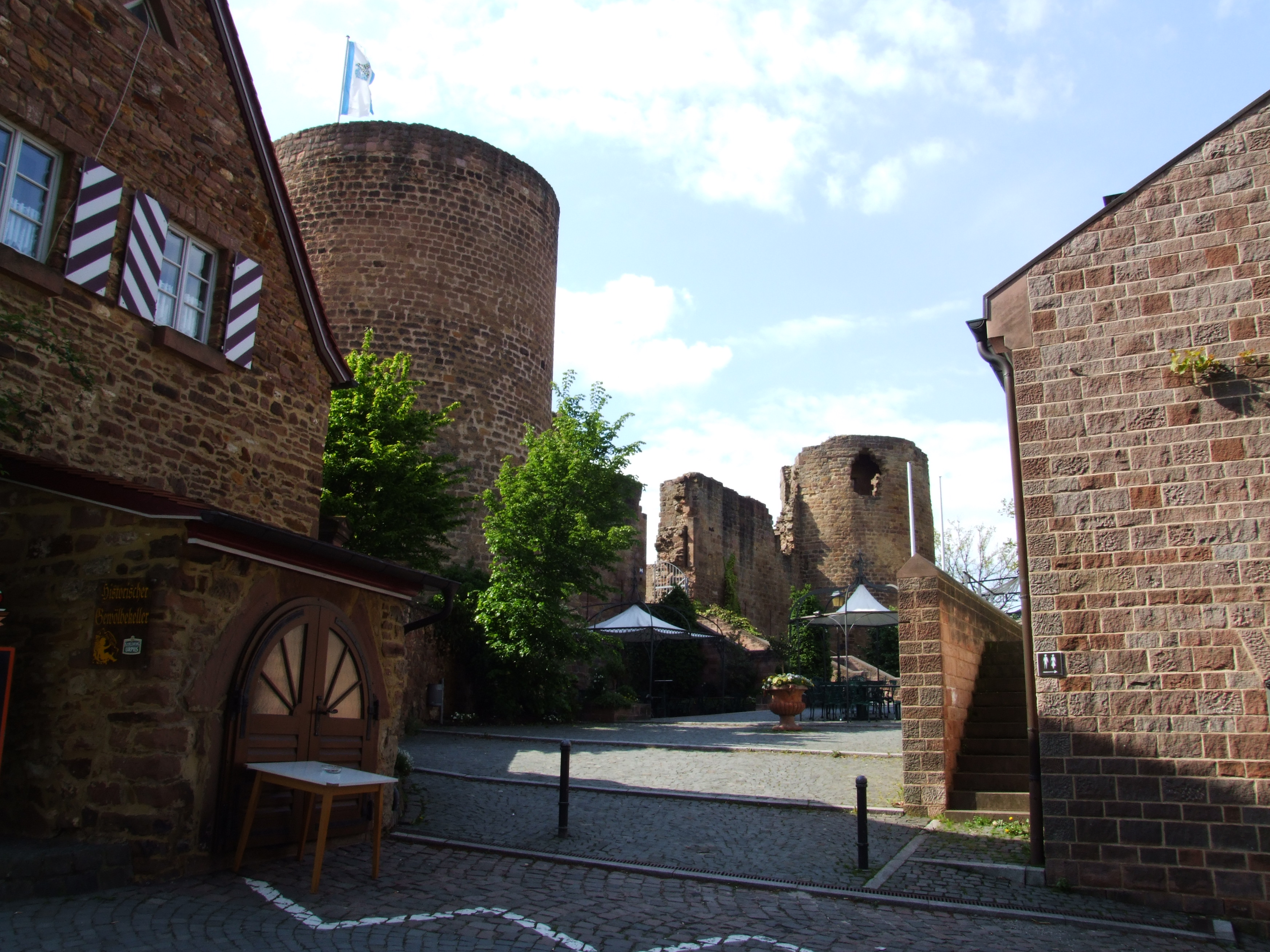
Neuleiningen Castle, eastern part of the castle with its tavern

Since 2004, the courtyard has been the venue for the Neuleiningen Castle Summer Concerts (Neuleininger Burgsommers). On five Saturdays between June and August, open-air concerts are held here.

In 2007 the Castle Wine Festival took place within the castle walls for the first time. Organised by local vintners, it has been established as a regular event.
