= County of Leiningen =

Former territories on the left bank of the Rhine

Coordinates: 49°32′24″N 8°08′24″E

Arms of the Leiningen family

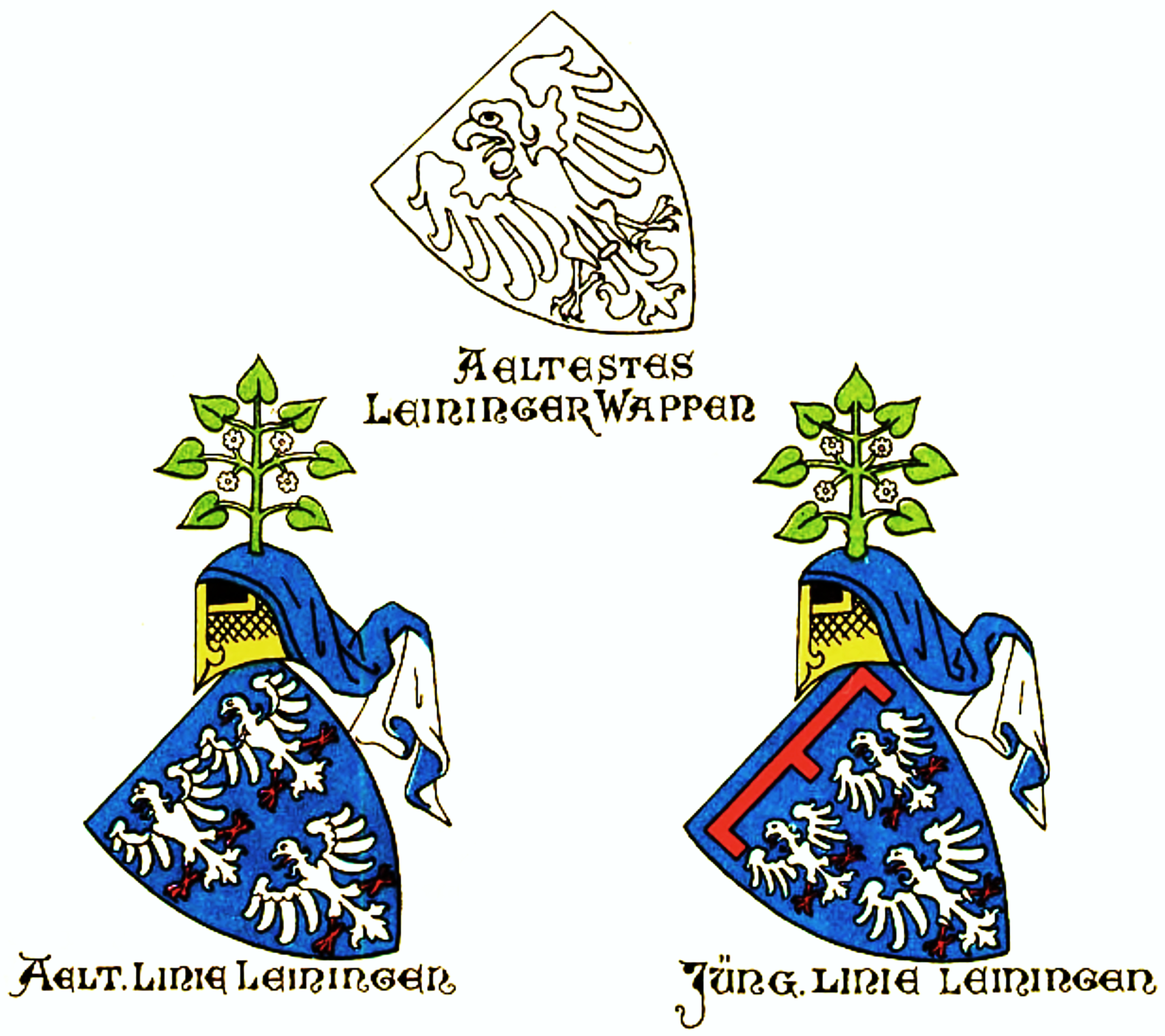
Evolution of the Leiningen arms

The County of Leiningen was a territory comprising a group of counties—some of which held Imperial immediacy—that were ruled by the Leiningen family.

Most of these counties were annexed by the French First Republic in 1793, following the conquest of the Left Bank of the Rhine by French troops during the War of the First Coalition. Several branches of the family subsequently received secularized abbeys as compensation; however, shortly thereafter, these newly established counties were mediatized, and the family lost its immediacy. Today, the only extant branch is that of the Princes of Leiningen.

== Origins ==
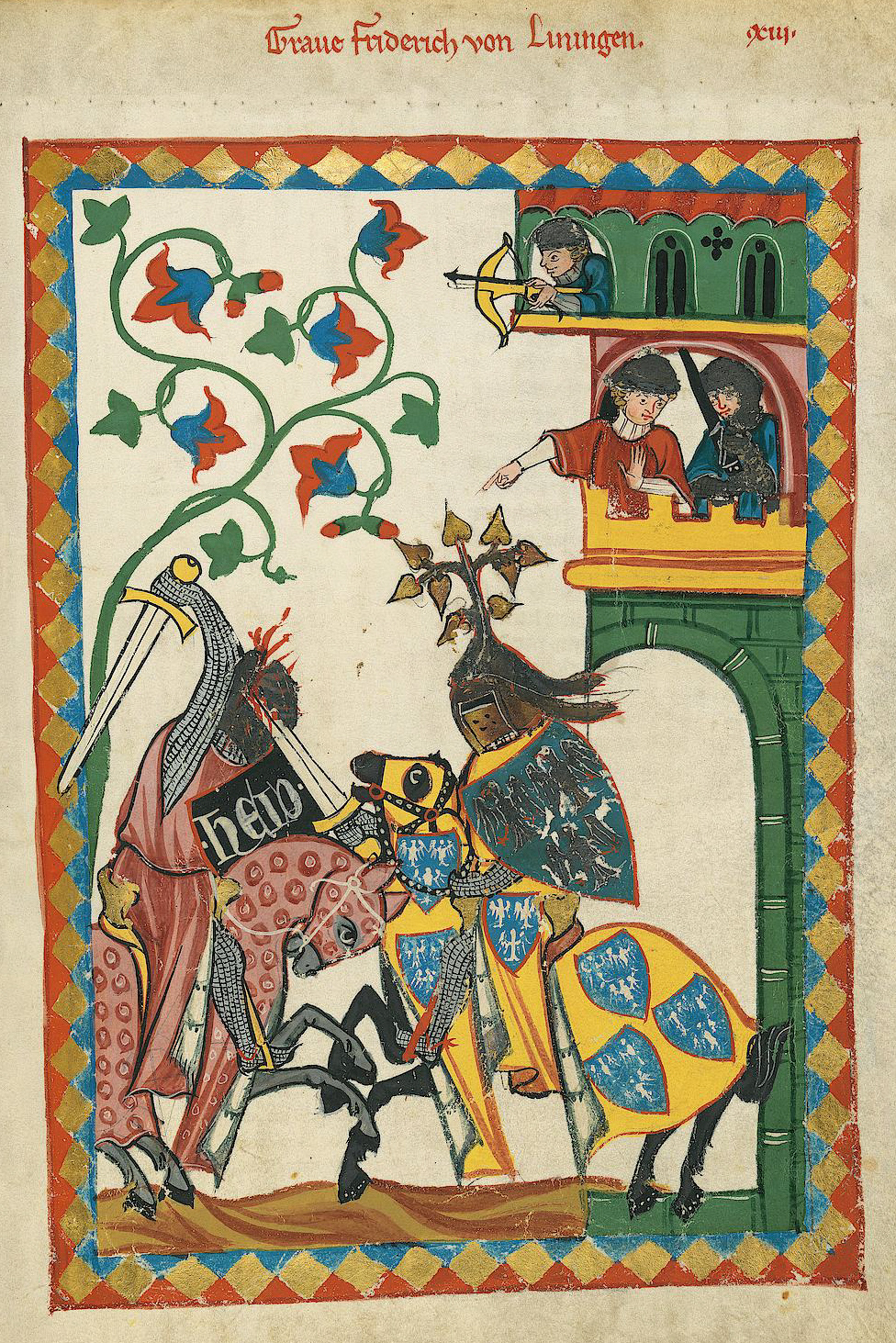
Count Frederick II (d. 1237)

The first count of Leiningen of whom anything definite is known was Emich II (d. before 1138). He—and perhaps his father, Emich I—built Leiningen Castle (now known as Old Leiningen Castle, German: Burg Altleiningen) circa 1100–1110. Nearby, Höningen Abbey was constructed around 1120 as the family's burial place. The first reliable mention of the family dates to 1128, when Emicho, Count of Leiningen, testified to a document from Adalbert I of Saarbrücken, Archbishop of Mainz.

The original family became extinct in the male line when Count Frederick II died around 1214 or 1220. Frederick I's sister, Liutgarde, married Simon II, Count of Saarbrücken, and one of their sons—also named Frederick—inherited the Leiningen lands and adopted their arms and name, becoming known as Frederick II (d. 1237). A Minnesinger, one of his songs was included in the Codex Manesse. Before 1212, he built a new castle called Hardenburg, approximately 10 kilometers south of Altleiningen. This castle was constructed outside the county of Leiningen on the territory of Limburg Abbey—of which his uncle was the overlord (Vogt)—leading to some conflict.

His eldest son, Simon (c. 1204–1234), married Gertrude, heiress of the County of Dagsburg, thereby bringing that property into the family. They had no children, and Simon's two brothers jointly inherited the county of Leiningen: Frederick III (d. 1287) inherited Dagsburg, while Emich IV (d. c. 1276) inherited Landeck Castle. Emich IV founded the town of Landau; however, the Landeck branch became extinct with his grandson in 1290. Frederick III, who disliked sharing Leiningen Castle with his brother, had a new castle built between 1238 and 1241 approximately 5 kilometers northeast of Leiningen, called Neuleiningen Castle ("New Leiningen"). His son, Frederick IV (d. 1316), had two sons who divided the county into Leiningen-Dagsburg and Leiningen-Hardenburg.

== History ==
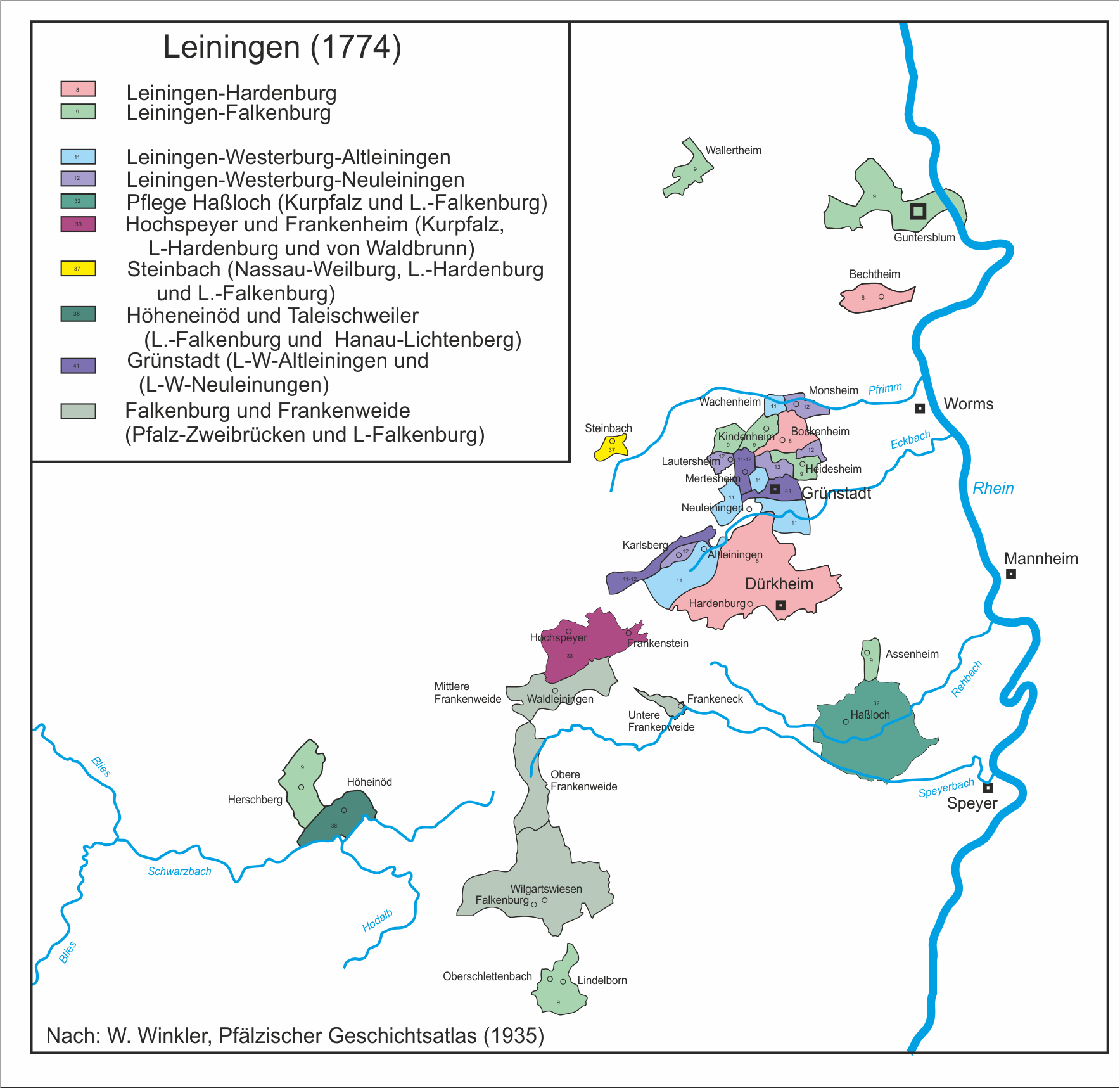
Map of the counties in 1774

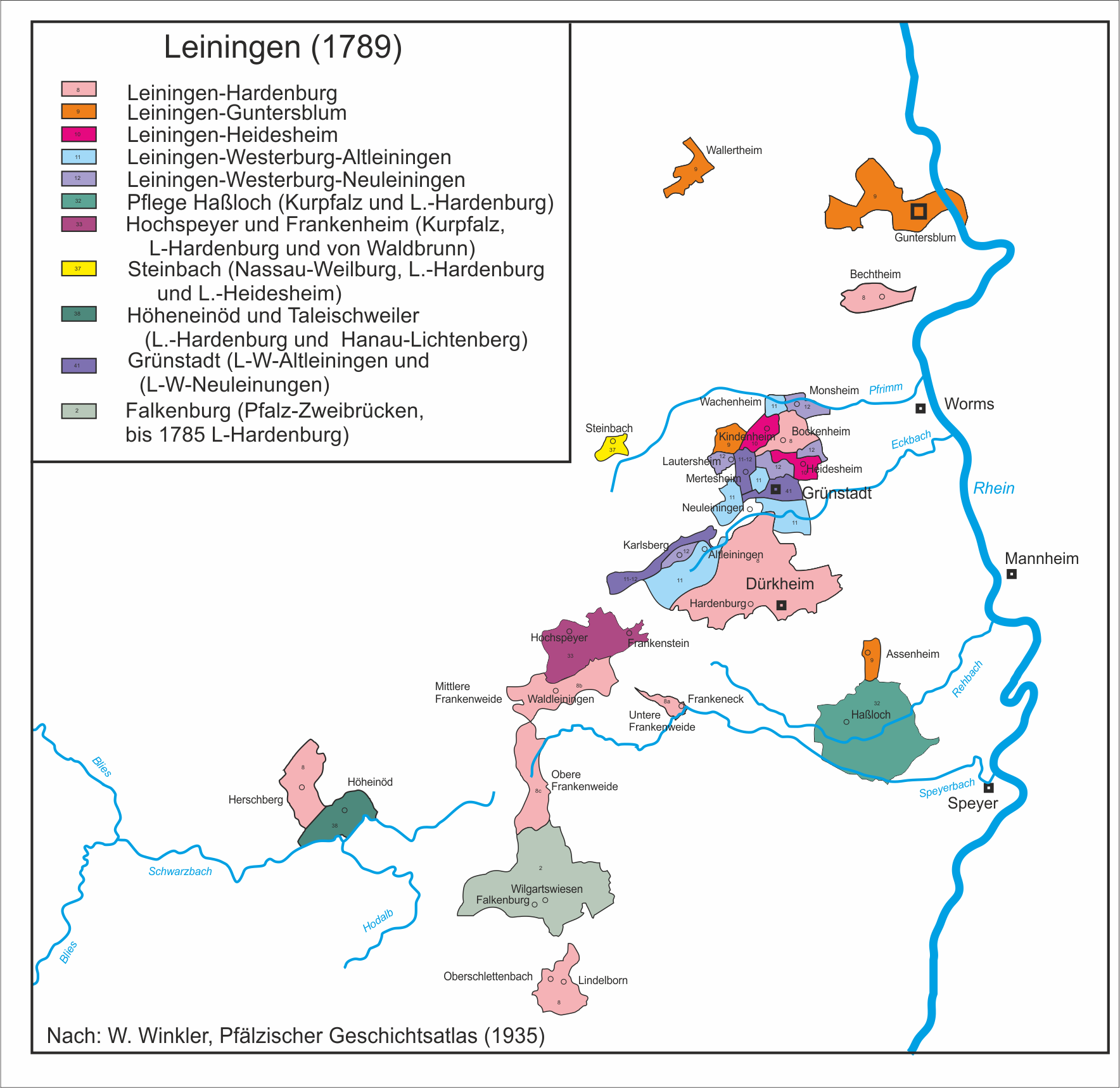
Map of the counties in 1789

After expanding its possessions, the Leiningen family was divided around 1317 into two branches:

=== Leiningen-Westerburg ===
The elder branch, headed by a landgrave, became extinct in 1467. Upon the death of the last landgrave, his sister Margaret—wife of Reinhard, Lord of Westerburg—inherited the lands, and her descendants became known as the Leiningen-Westerburg family. Later, this family split into two branches: Leiningen-Westerburg-Alt-Leiningen and Leiningen-Westerburg-Neu-Leiningen, both of which are extinct today.

Following the French Revolution, the Left Bank of the Rhine was conquered during the War of the First Coalition and annexed by France in 1793. The counts of Alt- and Neu-Leiningen were arrested and imprisoned in Paris, resulting in the loss of their territories. In 1803, they were compensated with the secularized Ilbenstadt Abbey (at Niddatal) and Engelthal Abbey. The German mediatization of 1806 ended these short-lived counties when their territories were divided among the Grand Duchy of Berg, the Grand Duchy of Hesse, Nassau-Weilburg, and Nassau-Usingen. Ilbenstadt Abbey was sold by the House of Leiningen-Westerburg-Altleiningen in 1921, and Engelthal Abbey was sold by the heirs of the House of Leiningen-Westerburg-Neuleiningen in 1952.

=== Leiningen-Hardenburg ===
Meanwhile, the younger branch of the Leiningen family, known as Leiningen-Hardenburg, flourished.

On 27 June 1560, this branch was divided into two lines: Leiningen-Dagsburg-Hardenburg, founded by Count Johann Philip (d. 1562), and Leiningen-Dagsburg-Heidesheim or Falkenburg, founded by Count Emicho (d. 1593).

In 1658, the Leiningen-Dagsburg-Falkenburg line further divided into:

- Leiningen-Dagsburg (extinct 1706)
- Leiningen-Heidesheim (extinct 1766)
- Leiningen-Guntersblum (extinct 1774)

The county of Leiningen-Dagsburg was inherited by the Leiningen-Dagsburg-Hardenburg line in 1774.

Leiningen-Guntersblum subsequently split into two side branches:

- Leiningen-Dagsburg-Falkenburg-Guntersblum – This branch was deprived of its lands on the Left Bank of the Rhine by France but received Billigheim as compensation in 1803, thereafter known as Leiningen-Billigheim. In 1845, they acquired Neuburg Castle at Obrigheim. This branch became extinct in 1925.
- Leiningen-Heidesheim – In 1803, this branch received Neudenau and became known as Leiningen-Neudenau; it became extinct in 1910.

In 1779, the head of the Leiningen-Dagsburg-Hardenburg line was raised to the rank of Prince of the Holy Roman Empire with the title Prince of Leiningen.

In 1801, this line was deprived of its lands on the left bank of the Rhine however, in 1803 it received Amorbach Abbey as compensation.

A few years later, the Principality of Leiningen at Amorbach was mediatized, and its territory is now mainly included in Baden, with parts in Bavaria and Hesse. Amorbach Abbey remains the family seat of the Prince of Leiningen.

Since 1991, the head of the princely line has been Prince Andreas (b. 1955). His eldest brother, Prince Karl Emich, was excluded from the succession after marrying morganatically.

== Rulers ==
=== House of Leiningen ===
Partitions of Leiningen under Leiningen rule

County of Leiningen (1st creation) (1093–1316)	Lordships of Runkel and Westerburg (until 1470)
County of Dagsburg (1st creation) (1316–1470)
County of Rixingen (1st creation) (1344–1507)	County of Hardenburg (1316–1779)
Renamed as: County of Westerburg (1470–1597) (female branch of Leiningen-Westerburg)
Annexed to Daun-Oberstein and Hohenfels (from 1507)
Raised to: Principality of Leiningen (1779–1806)	County of Falkenburg (1541–1806)
County of Leiningen (2nd creation) (1547–1656)
County of Schaumburg (1547–1708)
County of Rixingen (2nd creation) (1622–1705)
County of Broich- Oberstein (1657-1709/22)	County of Guntersblum (1657–1774) (1787–1806)	County of Oberbronn (1622–1724)
County of Neuleiningen (Younger Leiningen) (1695–1793)
County of Altleiningen (Elder Leiningen) (1695–1793)
Mediatised to the Grand Duchy of Baden (from 1806)	Mediatised to the Grand Duchy of Hesse (from 1806)	Mediatised to the Grand Duchy of Baden (from 1806)	Annexed to France (1793–1806); Mediatised to the Grand Duchies of Berg and Hesse and the Nassau Principalities of Weilburg and Usingen (from 1806)

Table of rulers
Notes:
- The House of Leiningen challenged at some times the German custom of male-originated surname. The original male line of the family died in 1214, and therefore had to rely on female succession and inheritance to preserve the surname. The post-1214 House of Leiningen (or agnatically House of Saarbrücken, as the family who ruled in the County of Saarbrücken) is cognatic, descendant of Liutgard, sister of the last count, Frederick I. The same applies to the line of Leiningen-Westerburg, originally called Runkel or Runkel-Westerburg: the inheritance of countess Margaret (d.1470) caused the change of name to Leiningen, and therefore included in the group of rulers of the family.

Ruler	Born	Reign	Ruling part	Consort	Death	Notes
Emicho I	c.1070? Son of Emicho of Flonheim	1093-1138	County of Leiningen	Alberade four children	1138 aged 67–68?	Possibly the founder of the family and the county.
Emicho II	c.1120? Son of Emicho I and Alberade	1138-1189	County of Leiningen	Unknown three children	1189 aged 68–69?	
Emicho III	c.1140? Son of Emicho II and Elisabeth	1189-1210	County of Leiningen	Elisabeth (d.1179) three children	c.1210 aged 69–70?	
Frederick I	c.1160? Son of Emicho III	1210-1220	County of Leiningen	Gertrude of Habsburg at least two children	c.1220 aged 59–60?	Left no heirs. After his death with no offspring, the Leiningen lands were inherited by his namesake nephew, son of his sister Liutgard. Given the dates, it's possible that the unknown Leiningen woman who married Siegfried III of Runkel (transferring Westerburg to that family) was also his sister.
Frederick II	c.1190 Son of Simon II, Count of Saarbrücken and Luitgard of Leiningen	1220-1237	County of Leiningen	Agnes of Eberstein eight children Agnes of Zollern (d.10 March 1263) two children	1237 aged 46–47	Designated heir by his maternal uncle, he came (agnatically) from the House of Saarbrücken, but adopted his mother's surname, Leiningen. He was a Minnesinger (or troubadour). He also built the Hardenburg Castle.
Frederick III	c.1210 Second son of Frederick II and Agnes of Eberstein	1237-1287	County of Leiningen	Adelaide of Kyburg (1220-aft.1258) c.1245 one child	1287 aged 76–77	Children of Frederick II, divided the land. Frederick III inherited from his elder brother Simon (who predeceased his father) the County of Dagsburg. Simon had inherited it from his wife, the trouvère Gertrude of Dagsburg. Emicho IV established his rule at the region of Landau, who returned to Leiningen in the next generation.
Emicho IV	c.1215 Third son of Frederick II and Agnes of Eberstein	1237-1281	County of Leiningen (at Landau)	Elisabeth d'Aspremont (1227–1264); 1235 four children Margaret of Hengebach; 1265 no children	1281 aged 65–66	Children of Frederick II, divided the land. Frederick III inherited from his elder brother Simon (who predeceased his father) the County of Dagsburg. Simon had inherited it from his wife, the trouvère Gertrude of Dagsburg. Emicho IV established his rule at the region of Landau, who returned to Leiningen in the next generation.
Emicho V	c.1245? Son of Emicho IV and Elisabeth d'Aspremont	1281-1289	County of Leiningen (at Landau)	Catherine of Ochsenstein (d.1313) one child	1289 aged 43–44?	After his death, the feud of Landau returned to the main line.
Landau reabsorbed in Leiningen
Frederick IV	1250; Son of Frederick III and Adelaide of Kyburg	1287-1316	County of Leiningen	Matilda c.1260 no children Johanna of Sponheim-Kreuznach (1246–1282) c.1265 six children Jeanne d'Aspremont (d.1321); 1282 four children	1316 aged 65–66	
Frederick V	1269; Son of Frederick IV and Johanna of Sponheim-Kreuznach	1316-1327	County of Dagsburg	Sophia of Freiburg (1274-29 March 1335); 7 July 1286; Strasbourg two children	1327 aged 57–58	Children of Frederick IV, divided their inheritance.
Godfrey I	1304; Son of Frederick IV and Jeanne d'Aspremont	1316-1344	County of Hardenburg	Agnes of Ochsenstein (d.bef.17 February 1321); 30 March 1313 one child Matilda of Salm (d.1341); 17 February 1321 three children	1344 aged 39–40	Children of Frederick IV, divided their inheritance.
Frederick VI	1294; Son of Frederick V and Sophia of Freiburg	1327-1342	County of Dagsburg	Judith of Isenburg-Limburg seven children	1342 aged 47–48	
Frederick VII	c.1320? First son of Frederick VI and Judith of Isenburg-Limburg	1342-1378	County of Dagsburg	Marie of Châtillon; 1353 one child	1378 aged 57–58?	Children of Frederick VI, ruled jointly.
Frederick VIII	c.1320? Second son of Frederick VI and Judith of Isenburg-Limburg	1342-1397	County of Dagsburg	Catherine de Grandpré no children Yolande of Julich-Bergheim (d.1363) six children	1397 aged 76–77?	Children of Frederick VI, ruled jointly.
Fritzman [Frederick]	c.1315 Son of Godfrey I and Agnes of Ochsenstein	1344-1366	County of Rixingen	Johanna of Forbach; 16 October 1321 two children	1366 aged 50–51	Children of Godfrey I, divided their inheritance.
Emicho VI	c.1325 Son of Godfrey I and Matilda of Salm	1344 – 17 February 1381	County of Hardenburg	Luitgard of Falkenstein-Münzenberg c.1345 one child Margaret of Habsburg-Kyburg; 1362 eight children	17 February 1381 aged 55–56	Children of Godfrey I, divided their inheritance.
Godfrey II	c.1325? Son of Fritzman and Johanna of Forbach	1366-1380	County of Rixingen	Margaret of Baden (d.c.1380); 10 November 1363 three children	1380 aged 54–55?	
John	c.1365? Son of Godfrey II and Margaret of Baden	1380-1445	County of Rixingen	Elisabeth of Lützelstein (d.c.1435) six children	c.1445 aged 79–80?	
Emicho VII	1366; Son of Emicho VI and Margaret of Habsburg-Kyburg	17 February 1381 – 1452	County of Hardenburg	Clara of Finstingen-Brackenkopf (d.1409); 1383 no children Beatrice of Baden; 11 July 1411 ten children	1452 aged 85–86	
Frederick IX	c.1360? Son of Frederick VIII and Yolande of Julich-Bergheim	1397-1434	County of Dagsburg	Margaret of Baden-Hachberg; 25 July 1405 six children	1434 aged 73–74?	
Hesso	c.1405 Son of Frederick IX and Margaret of Baden-Hachberg	1434 – 8 March 1467	County of Dagsburg	Elisabeth of Bavaria; 4 October 1440; Worms no children	8 March 1467; Munich aged 61–62	Left no heirs, and was succeeded by his sister.
Rudolph	c.1420? Son of John and Elisabeth of Lützelstein	1445-1475	County of Rixingen	Agnes of Zweibrücken-Bitsch (d.February 1454); 15 July 1435 nine children	1475 aged 54–55	
Emicho VIII	c.1420? Son of Emicho VII and Beatrice of Baden	1452 – 30 March 1495	County of Hardenburg	Anna of Elter_Aspremont (d.aft.1500); Bef. 25 January 1466 eight children Barbara of Tengen-Nellenburg no children	30 March 1495 aged 74–75?	In 1492 requested to the Pope to raise the parish church in Bad Dürkheim to the status of a collegiate church.
Margaret	c.1405 Daughter of Frederick IX and Margaret of Baden-Hachberg	8 March 1467 – 1470	County of Dagsburg	Reinhard III, Lord of Westerburg; 24 August 1423 two children	1470 aged 64–65	Sister of Hesso, received the majority of his inheritance, and that was what made possible for her grandson and heir, Reinhard of Runkel, to adopt her surname after her death, forming the Leiningen-Westerburg branch.
Reinhard I	1453; Son of Cuno, Lord of Westerburg and Matilda of Virneburg	1470 – February 1522	County of Dagsburg Renamed; County of Westerburg	Anna of Eppenstein-Königstein (d.9 April 1483); 5 February 1456 three children Zymeria of Sayn (13 May 1469 – 2 June 1499); 12 August 1485 five children	February 1522 aged 68–69	Grandson of Margaret of Dagsburg. Inherited the county and the surname from her. Probably lost Dagsburg for Hardenburg, but he kept the rest of his grandmother's inheritance, including, for example, the main town of Leiningen.
Hanneman [Herman]	1436; Son of Rudolph and Agnes of Zweibrücken-Bitsch	1475-1507	County of Rixingen	Adelaide of Zirk (d.1508); Bef.1457 two children	1507 aged 70–71	
Emicho IX	c.1470 Son of Emicho VIII and Anna of Elter-Aspremont	30 March 1495 – 18 February 1535	County of Hardenburg	Agnes of Eppstein-Münzenberg (d.28 July 1533); 1470 thirteen children	18 February 1535 aged 64–65	
Elisabeth	1471; First daughter of Hanneman and Adelaide of Zirk	1507-1529	County of Rixingen (1/2)	Emicho III, Lord of Daun-Falkenstein; 1477 four children	1529 aged 70–71	Children of Hanneman, divided their inheritance: Elisabeth and Walpurga received (each) half of the counties of Rixingen and Forbach.
Walpurga	c.1475? Second daughter of Hanneman and Adelaide of Zirk	1507-1530	County of Rixingen (1/2)	John I, Lord of Hohenfels-Raipoltskirchen bef.1492 six children	c.1530? aged 54–55?	Children of Hanneman, divided their inheritance: Elisabeth and Walpurga received (each) half of the counties of Rixingen and Forbach.
Rixingen inherited by Daun-Oberstein and Hohenfels
Philip (I)	1483; Son of Reinhard I and Anna of Eppenstein-Königstein	February 1522 – 1523	County of Westerburg	Unmarried	1523 aged 39–40	Left no heirs.
Eva	1481; Daughter of Reinhard I and Anna of Eppenstein-Königstein	1523 – 23 February 1543	County of Westerburg	Unmarried	23 February 1543 aged 61–62	Brother and sister of Philip, ruled jointly. Cuno was severely in debt to his sister, and gave her part of the county for her to rule in her own right. Eva proved to be a popular ruler: she founded a hospital in Grünstadt and became a popular symbol in the Palatinate.
Cuno	27 September 1487; Son of Reinhard I and Zymeria of Sayn	1523 – 23 November 1547	County of Westerburg	Maria of Stolberg-Wernigerode; 1523 ten children	23 November 1547 aged 60	Brother and sister of Philip, ruled jointly. Cuno was severely in debt to his sister, and gave her part of the county for her to rule in her own right. Eva proved to be a popular ruler: she founded a hospital in Grünstadt and became a popular symbol in the Palatinate.
Emicho X	1498; Son of Emicho IX and Agnes of Eppstein-Münzenberg	18 February 1535 – 10 January 1541	County of Hardenburg	Catharina of Nassau-Saarbrücken (11 November 1517 – 1 January 1553); 17 July 1537 three children	10 January 1541 aged 42–43	
Regency of Catharina of Nassau-Saarbrücken (1541-1553)						Children of Emicho X, ruled under regency, and then divided the land. It's implied that sometime between 1470 and 1540, Dagsburg was acquired by Waldeck-Hardenburg.
John Philip I	25 December 1539; First son of Emicho X and Catharina of Nassau-Saarbrücken	10 January 1541 – 8 September 1562	County of Hardenburg	Anna of Mansfeld-Eisleben; 15 December 1560; Mansfeld one child	8 September 1562 aged 22	Children of Emicho X, ruled under regency, and then divided the land. It's implied that sometime between 1470 and 1540, Dagsburg was acquired by Waldeck-Hardenburg.
Emicho XI	15 December 1540; Second son of Emicho X and Catharina of Nassau-Saarbrücken	10 January 1541 – 13 March 1593	County of Falkenburg	Ursula of Fleckenstein-Dagstuhl; 18 February 1577; Hardenburg two children	13 March 1593 aged 52	Children of Emicho X, ruled under regency, and then divided the land. It's implied that sometime between 1470 and 1540, Dagsburg was acquired by Waldeck-Hardenburg.
Philip I	10 November 1527; First son of Cuno and Maria of Stolberg-Wernigerode	23 November 1547 – 17 September 1597	County of Leiningen	Amalia of Zweibrücken-Lichtenberg (1537-11 September 1577); 22 November 1551; Heidelberg six children Amalia of Daun-Falkenstein; 16 February 1578 six children	17 September 1597 aged 69	Children of Cuno, divided the land.
Reinhard II	19 November 1530; Third son of Cuno and Maria of Stolberg-Wernigerode	23 November 1547 – 17 September 1584	County of Westerburg	Ottilia of Manderscheid-Blankenheim-Keil; 14 July 1561 eight children	17 September 1584 aged 53	Children of Cuno, divided the land.
George I	23 April 1533; Fifth son of Cuno and Maria of Stolberg-Wernigerode	23 November 1547 – 9 April 1586	County of Schaumburg	Margaret of Isenburg-Birstein; 24 May 1570; Büdingen five children	9 April 1586 aged 32	Children of Cuno, divided the land.
Regency of Anna of Mansfeld-Eisleben (1562-1576)						Published in 1580 the Book of Confessions
Emicho XII	4 November 1562; Hardenburg; Son of John Philip I and Anna of Mansfeld-Eisleben	8 September 1562 – 24 November 1607	County of Hardenburg	Maria Elisabeth of the Palatinate-Zweibrücken; 7 November 1585; Hardenburg six children	24 November 1607; Darmstadt aged 45	Published in 1580 the Book of Confessions
Albert Philip	1567; First son of Reinhard II and Ottilia of Manderscheid-Blankenheim-Keil	17 September 1584 – 1597	County of Westerburg	Unmarried	1597 aged 29–30	Children of Reinhard II, ruled jointly.
John Louis	1572; Third son of Reinhard II and Ottilia of Manderscheid-Blankenheim-Keil	17 September 1584 – 1597	County of Westerburg	Unmarried	1597 aged 24–25	Children of Reinhard II, ruled jointly.
Westerburg annexed to Schaumburg
Regency of Margaret of Isenburg-Birstein (1586-1588)						Children of George I, ruled jointly. After the death of his brother, Reinhard III associated his eldest nephew (and son-in-law) to the co-rulership.
Reinhard III	24 October 1574; Third son of George I and Margaret of Isenburg-Birstein	9 April 1586 – 14 October 1655	County of Schaumburg	Anna of Solms-Lich; 1 January 1615; Lich three children	14 October 1655 aged 80	Children of George I, ruled jointly. After the death of his brother, Reinhard III associated his eldest nephew (and son-in-law) to the co-rulership.
Christoph	30 September 1575; Fourth son ofGeorge I and Margaret of Isenburg-Birstein	9 April 1586 – 1635	County of Schaumburg	Anna Maria Ungnad (29 September 1573 – 1606); 25 August 1601 one child Philippa Catherine of Wied (1595–1647); 1611 twelve children	1635 aged 59–60	Children of George I, ruled jointly. After the death of his brother, Reinhard III associated his eldest nephew (and son-in-law) to the co-rulership.
Philip Louis	1617; First son of Christoph and Philippa Catherine of Wied	1635-1637	County of Schaumburg	Maria Juliana of Leiningen-Schaumburg; 11 October 1636 no children	1637 aged 19–20	Children of George I, ruled jointly. After the death of his brother, Reinhard III associated his eldest nephew (and son-in-law) to the co-rulership.
John Louis	8 May 1579; First son of Emicho XI and Ursula of Fleckenstein-Dagstuhl	13 March 1593 – 19 June 1625	County of Falkenburg	Maria Barbara of Sulz (13 December 1588 – 1 March 1625); 1 June 1611 five children	19 June 1625 aged 46	Children of Emicho XI, ruled jointly.
Philip George	26 July 1582; Second son of Emicho XI and Ursula of Fleckenstein-Dagstuhl	13 March 1593 – 6 February 1627	County of Falkenburg	Anna of Erbach; 4 July 1614; Fürstenau five children	6 February 1627 aged 44	Children of Emicho XI, ruled jointly.
Louis	10 August 1557; Son of Philip I and Amalia of Zweibrücken-Lichtenberg	17 September 1597 – 22 August 1622	County of Leiningen	Bernardine of Lippe; 1578 nine children	22 August 1622 aged 65	
John Philip II	26 April 1588; Hardenburg; First son of Emicho XII and Maria Elisabeth of the Palatinate-Zweibrücken	24 November 1607 – 25 May 1643	County of Hardenburg	Elisabeth of Leiningen-Falkenburg; 1 January 1620; Hardenburg three children Anna Juliana of Salm-Mörchingen; 23 February 1626 one child Anna Elisabeth of Oettingen-Oettingen; 11 June 1642 no children	25 May 1643; Hardenburg aged 55	Children of Emicho XII, ruled jointly.
Frederick X	8 February 1593; Hardenburg; Third son of Emicho XII and Maria Elisabeth of the Palatinate-Zweibrücken	24 November 1607 – 29 April 1631	County of Hardenburg	Maria Elisabeth of Nassau-Saarbrücken (21 August 1602 – 9 December 1626); 22 August 1624; Saarbrücken no children Anna of Nassau-Weilburg (6 January 1597 – 7 January 1645); 18 (28) November 1628; Ottweiler six children	29 April 1631 aged 38	Children of Emicho XII, ruled jointly.
John Casimir	1 February 1587; Third son of Louis and Bernardine of Lippe	22 August 1622 – 30 September 1635	County of Leiningen	Martha of Hohenlohe-Langenburg (29 April 1575 – 19 December 1638); 23 January 1617; Langenburg no children	30 September 1635 aged 48	Children of Louis, divided the land. John Casimir left no heirs, and after his death his share of the inheritance was split between the other two.
Philip II	5 January 1591; Fourth son of Louis and Bernardine of Lippe	22 August 1622 – 9 February 1668	County of Rixingen	Agatha Catherine Schenk of Limpurg (30 July 1595 – 30 January 1664); 20 August 1618 two children	9 February 1668 aged 77	Children of Louis, divided the land. John Casimir left no heirs, and after his death his share of the inheritance was split between the other two.
Louis Emicho	14 August 1595; Fifth son of Louis and Bernardine of Lippe	22 August 1622 – 1 June 1635	County of Oberbronn	Esther of Eberstein (11 April 1603 – 10 October 1682); 21 August 1624 five children	1 June 1635; Oberbronn aged 39	Children of Louis, divided the land. John Casimir left no heirs, and after his death his share of the inheritance was split between the other two.
Leiningen annexed to Rixingen and Oberbronn
Emicho XIII	12 June 1612; Heidesheim am Rhein; Son of John Louis and Maria Barbara of Sulz	6 February 1627 – 1 March 1657	County of Falkenburg	Christiana of Solms-Laubach; 24 May 1632; Laubach two children Dorothea of Waldeck-Wildungen; 24 May 1632; Falkenstein seven children	1 March 1657; Speyer aged 44	
Regency of Esther of Eberstein (1635-1639)						
John Louis	1625; Son of Louis Emicho and Esther of Eberstein	1 June 1635 – 18 April 1665	County of Oberbronn	Sibylla Christina of Wied; 1651 seven children	18 April 1665; Oberbronn aged 39–40	
Frederick Emicho	9 February 1621; Hardenburg; First son of John Philip II and Elisabeth of Leiningen-Falkenburg	25 May 1643 – 26 July 1698	County of Hardenburg	Sybilla of Waldeck-Wildungen; 15 June 1644; Hardenburg nine children	26 July 1698; Hardenburg aged 77	Children of John Philip II, ruled jointly.
John Philip III	19 February 1622; Hardenburg; Second son of John Philip II and Elisabeth of Leiningen-Falkenburg	25 May 1643 – 19 February 1666	County of Hardenburg	Agnes of Waldeck-Wildungen; 5 February 1551; Waldeck one child Elisabeth Charlotte of Solms-Sonnenwalde; 1658 one child	19 February 1666; Hardenburg aged 44	Children of John Philip II, ruled jointly.
George William	10 February 1619; Second son of Christoph and Philippa Catherine of Wied	14 October 1655 – 22 November 1695	County of Schaumburg	Sophia Elisabeth of Lippe-Detmold; 7 May 1644; Schwalenberg nineteen children	22 November 1695 aged 76	
George William	8 March 1632; Heidesheim am Rhein; Son of Emicho XIII and Christiana of Solms-Laubach	1 March 1657 – 19 July 1672	County of Falkenburg	Anna Elisabeth of Daun-Falkenstein; 24 March 1658 five children	19 July 1672; Idar-Oberstein aged 40	Children of Emicho XIII, divided their inheritance. Emicho Christian left no surviving sons; while Broich was reannexed to Falkenburg, Oberstein was inherited by his daughter.
Emicho Christian	29 March 1642; First son of Emicho XIII and Dorothea of Waldeck-Wildungen	1 March 1657 – 27 April 1702	County of Broich-Oberstein	Christiane Louise of Daun-Falkenstein (18 July 1640 – 27 April 1702); 17 July 1664; Falkenstein twelve children	27 April 1702 aged 60	Children of Emicho XIII, divided their inheritance. Emicho Christian left no surviving sons; while Broich was reannexed to Falkenburg, Oberstein was inherited by his daughter.
John Louis I	26 February 1643; Heidesheim am Rhein; First son of Emicho XIII and Dorothea of Waldeck-Wildungen	1 March 1657 – 2 March 1687	County of Guntersblum	Amalia Sybilla of Daun-Falkenstein (27 June 1639-?); 22 August 1664 two children Sophia Sibylla, Countess of Leiningen-Oberbronn; 1678 two children	2 March 1687 aged 44	Children of Emicho XIII, divided their inheritance. Emicho Christian left no surviving sons; while Broich was reannexed to Falkenburg, Oberstein was inherited by his daughter.
Broich reabsorbed by Falkenstein
Regency of Sibylla Christina of Wied (1665-1668)						Daughters of John Louis, ruled jointly. The estate eventually passed to the children of Sophia Sibylla's first marriage, which meant an annexation to Leiningen-Guntersblum.
Esther Juliana	c.1655 Oberbronn; First daughter of John Louis and Sibylla Christina of Wied	18 April 1665 – 1709	County of Oberbronn (1/3)	Louis, Baron of Sinclair (d.1738) no children	1709; Oberbronn aged 53–54	Daughters of John Louis, ruled jointly. The estate eventually passed to the children of Sophia Sibylla's first marriage, which meant an annexation to Leiningen-Guntersblum.
Sophia Sibylla	14 July 1656; Oberbronn; Second daughter of John Louis and Sibylla Christina of Wied	18 April 1665 – 13 April 1724	County of Oberbronn (2/3)	John Louis I, Count of Leiningen-Guntersblum (26 February 1643 – 2 March 1687); 1678 two children Frederick II, Landgrave of Hesse-Homburg; 15 November 1691; Bad Homburg three children	13 April 1724; Oberbronn aged 67	Daughters of John Louis, ruled jointly. The estate eventually passed to the children of Sophia Sibylla's first marriage, which meant an annexation to Leiningen-Guntersblum.
Oberbronn annexed to Guntersblum
Louis Eberhard	18 July 1624; Son of Philip II and Agatha Catherine Schenk of Limpurg	9 February 1668 – 14 November 1688	County of Rixingen	Charlotte of Nassau-Saarbrücken (1 December 1619 – 13 November 1687); 6/16 January 1650; Altleiningen seven children		14 November 1688 aged 64
Regency of Anna Elisabeth of Daun-Falkenstein (1672-1676)						
John Charles August	19 March 1662; Son of George William and Anna Elisabeth of Daun-Falkenstein	19 July 1672 – 13 November 1698	County of Falkenburg	Johanna Magdalene of Hanau-Lichtenberg; 13 December 1685; Babenhausen seven children	13 November 1698 aged 36	
John Louis II	29 July 1673; Son of John Louis I and Amalia Sybilla of Daun-Falkenstein	2 March 1687 – 1699	County of Guntersblum	Anna Ernestina of Vehlen-Megen (12 April 1650 – 23 February 1729); 1694 four children	1699 aged 25–26	Children of John Louis I, ruled jointly.
Emicho Leopold	6 November 1685; Son of John Louis I and Amalia Sybilla of Daun-Falkenstein	2 March 1687 – 2 January 1719	County of Guntersblum	Charlotte Amalia of Leiningen-Falkenburg (1682–1729); 5 March 1709 six children	2 January 1719 aged 33	Children of John Louis I, ruled jointly.
Philip Louis	February 1652; Réchicourt-le-Château; Son of Louis Eberhard and Charlotte of Nassau-Saarbrücken	14 November 1688 – 16 August 1705	County of Rixingen	Louise Gabrielle de Rouse (d.24 December 1698); 26 December 1673; Paris five children Sidonia Theresa of Ibiswald (d.April 1720); 1699 no children	Left no heirs. His county was annexed to Leiningen-Schaumburg.	16 August 1705; Cassano aged 53
Rixingen annexed to Schaumburg
John Anton	15 January 1655; Fifth son of George William and Sophia Elisabeth of Lippe-Detmold	2 November 1695 – 2 October 1698	County of Schaumburg	Christina Louise of Sayn-Wittgenstein (1673-25 February 1745); 13 February 1692 two children	2 October 1698; Wetzlar aged 43	Children of George William, ruled jointly.
Henry Christian	1 February 1665; Ninth son of George William and Sophia Elisabeth of Lippe-Detmold	2 November 1695 – 2 February 1702	County of Schaumburg	Albertina Elisabeth of Sayn-Wittgenstein (20 July 1661 – 26 November 1716); 20 July 1681 two children	2 February 1702; Cremona aged 37	Children of George William, ruled jointly.
Christoph Christian	11 March 1656; Sixth son of George William and Sophia Elisabeth of Lippe-Detmold	2 November 1695 – 17 May 1728	County of Elder Leiningen	Juliana Elisabeth of Lippe-Biesterfeld; 6/8 June 1678 three children	17 May 1728; Bad Dürkheim aged 72	Children of George William, ruled jointly.
George II	2 March 1666; Tenth son of George William and Sophia Elisabeth of Lippe-Detmold	2 November 1695 – 4 May 1726	County of Younger Leiningen	Anna Elisabeth Wilhelmina of Bentheim-Tecklenburg (1641-26 May 1696); 27 May 1684 no children Anna Magdalena of Bodenhausen (6 October 1660 – 6 September 1709); 1697 one child Margaretha Christiana Augusta of Gildevnlöw-Daneskiold-Laurwig; 2 (23) February 1711; Augustenburg nine children	4 May 1726; Westerburg aged 60	Children of George William, ruled jointly.
John Frederick	18 March 1661; Hardenburg; Son of Frederick Emicho and Sybilla of Waldeck-Wildungen	26 July 1698 – 9 February 1722	County of Hardenburg	Dorothea Friederike of Allefeld-Rixingen (16 December 1661 – 16 November 1698); September 1686 two children Catherine of Baden-Durlach; 19 June 1701; Karlsburg Castle six children	9 February 1722; Hardenburg aged 60	
Regency of Johanna Magdalene of Hanau-Lichtenberg (1698-1709)						Children of John Charles August. Christian Charles inherited Broich, and John William Louis the rest of Dagsburg-Falkenburg. It's possible that Falkenburg reverted to Hardenburg after John William's death.
Christian Charles Reinhard	7 July 1695; Mülheim an der Ruhr; Second son of John Charles August and Johanna Magdalene of Hanau-Lichtenberg	13 November 1698 – 17 November 1766	County of Falkenburg (at Broich)	Catherine Polyxena of Solms-Rödelheim (30 January 1702 – 29 March 1765); 27 November 1726; Mettenheim six children	17 November 1766; Heidesheim am Rhein aged 71	Children of John Charles August. Christian Charles inherited Broich, and John William Louis the rest of Dagsburg-Falkenburg. It's possible that Falkenburg reverted to Hardenburg after John William's death.
John William Louis	5 April 1697; Third son of John Charles August and Johanna Magdalene of Hanau-Lichtenberg	13 November 1698 – November 1742	County of Falkenburg	Sophia Eleonore of Leiningen-Guntersblum (1710-19 June 1768); 1730 two children	November 1742 aged 45	Children of John Charles August. Christian Charles inherited Broich, and John William Louis the rest of Dagsburg-Falkenburg. It's possible that Falkenburg reverted to Hardenburg after John William's death.
Dagsburg-Falkenburg (except Broich) annexed to Hardenburg
Elisabeth Dorothea	11 June 1665; Daughter of Emicho Christian and Christiane Louise of Daun-Falkenstein	27 April 1702 – 1722	County of Broich-Oberstein (at Oberstein only)	Maurice Herman, Count of Limburg-Stirum; 19 October 1692 six children	1722 aged 56–57	Inherited Oberstein, and may have passed it to her descendants.
Oberstein inherited by Limburg-Stirum
Regency of Christina Louise of Sayn-Wittgenstein (1702-1707)						Son of John Anton, left no heirs.
George Frederick	1693; Son of John Anton and Christina Louise of Sayn-Wittgenstein	2 February 1702 – 1708	County of Schaumburg	Unmarried	1708 aged 14–15	Son of John Anton, left no heirs.
Schaumburg was divided between Altleiningen and Neuleiningen
John Francis	22 May 1698; Son of John Louis II and Anna Ernestina of Vehlen-Megen	2 January 1719 – 1750	County of Guntersblum	Charlotte of Walderode (24 September 1703 – 1745); 6 July 1736 three children	1750 aged 51–52	Cousins, ruled jointly.
Emicho Louis	22 December 1709; Emicho Leopold and Charlotte Amalia of Leiningen-Falkenburg	2 January 1719 – 23 September 1766	County of Guntersblum	Polyxena Wilhelmina of Leiningen-Falkenburg (8 October 1730 – 21 March 1800); 27 March 1752 two children	23 September 1766 aged 56	Cousins, ruled jointly.
Frederick Magnus	27 March 1703; Worms; First son of John Frederick and Catherine of Baden-Durlach	9 February 1722 – 28 October 1756	County of Hardenburg	Anna Christiana Eleonora of Wurmbrand-Stupach (13 March 1698 – 4 January 1763); 26 November 1723 five children	28 October 1756 aged 53	Children of John Frederick, divided the land.
Charles Louis	16 February 1704; Hardenburg; Second son of John Frederick and Catherine of Baden-Durlach	9 February 1722 – 20 March 1747	County of Hardenburg (at Bockenheim)	Caroline of Salm-Daun (7 January 1706 – 26 May 1786); 27 November 1726 three children	20 March 1747; Battenberg aged 43	Children of John Frederick, divided the land.
Bockenheim reabsorbed in Hardenburg
Regency of Margaretha Christiana Augusta of Gildevnlöw-Daneskiold-Laurwig (1726-1740)						Children of George II, ruled jointly.
George Charles	17 February 1717; Second son of George II and Margaretha Christiana Augusta of Gildevnlöw-Daneskiold-Laurwig	4 May 1726 – 19 March 1787	County of Younger Leiningen	Johanna Elisabeth Amalia of Isenburg-Philippseich (19 March 1720 – 29 December 1780); 7 May 1741; Dreieich eight children	19 March 1787; Grünstadt aged 70	Children of George II, ruled jointly.
George Ernest	3 May 1718; Third son of George II and Margaretha Christiana Augusta of Gildevnlöw-Daneskiold-Laurwig	4 May 1726 – 24 December 1765	County of Younger Leiningen	Maria Louise of Wieser (10 April 1710 – 7 May 1773); 1738 eight children	24 December 1765 aged 47	Children of George II, ruled jointly.
George Herman	21 March 1679; Son of Christoph Christian and Juliana Elisabeth of Lippe-Biesterfeld	17 May 1728 – 4 February 1751	County of Elder Leiningen	Augusta Wilhelmina Philippina of Schaumburg-Lippe (15 June 1693 – 29 April 1721); 26 February 1712; Detmold no children Charlotte Wilhelmina of Pappenheim (15 June 1693 – 29 April 1721); 24 December 1724 five children	4 February 1751; Grünstadt aged 71	
Christian John	31 August 1730; Son of George Herman and Charlotte Wilhelmina of Pappenheim	4 February 1751 – 20 February 1770	County of Elder Leiningen	Christiana Franziska Eleonora of Salm-Grumbach (10 August 1735 – 29 November 1809); 5 December 1754 eleven children	20 February 1770 aged 40	
Charles Frederick William	14 August 1724; Hardenburg; Son of Frederick Magnusand Anna Christiana Eleonora of Wurmbrand-Stupach	28 October 1756 – 12 July 1806	County of Hardenburg (until 1779) Principality of Leiningen (from 1779; in 1803–06 in Amorbach Abbey only)	Christiane Wilhelmine of Solms-Rödelheim and Assenheim (24 April 1736 – 6 January 1803); 24 June 1749 four children	9 January 1807; Amorbach aged 82	Elevated to Prince in 1779. In 1801 he lost his possessions on the Left Bank of the Rhine to France, but was given Amorbach Abbey and its lands in compensation. In 1806, he was completely stripped of his functions as ruler of the already diminished principality, following the German mediatisation of 1806. From then on, he and his descendants kept only the title.
Leiningen mediatiased to the Grand Duchy of Baden
William Charles	5 July 1737; First son of John Francis and Charlotte of Walderode	23 September 1766 – 1774 17 January 1787 – 12 July 1806	County of Guntersblum (at Billigheim)	Eleonore von Bretzenheim; 21 November 1787 (annulled 1801) four children	26 January 1809 aged 71	Children of John Francis, divided their inheritance. They were both deposed in 1774, and Guntersblum was briefly annexed to Hardenburg. However, their possession were restored in 1787, to be definitely taken from them in 1806.
Wenceslaus Joseph	27 September 1738; Koblenz-Ehrenbreitstein; Second son of John Francis and Charlotte of Walderode	23 September 1766 – 1774 17 January 1787 – 12 July 1806	County of Guntersblum (at Neudenau)	Maria Margaretha of Sickingen (1744–1795); 11 June 1772 no children Maria Victoria of Grünberg (d.1838); 24 October 1803 no children	15 January 1825 aged 86	Children of John Francis, divided their inheritance. They were both deposed in 1774, and Guntersblum was briefly annexed to Hardenburg. However, their possession were restored in 1787, to be definitely taken from them in 1806.
Guntersblum annexed to Hardenburg (1774-87); Guntersblum mediatized to the Grand Duchy of Baden
Maria Louise	16 March 1729; Daughter of Christian Charles Reinhard and Catherine Polyxena of Solms-Rödelheim	17 November 1766 – 12 July 1806	County of Falkenburg (at Broich)	Prince George William of Hesse-Darmstadt; 16 March 1748; Heidesheim am Rhein nine children	11 March 1818 aged 88	Daughter of Christian Charles Reinhard, Maria Louise inherited her father's domains. In 1806, following the German mediatisation, Maria Louise lost her county.
Broich mediatiased to the Grand Duchy of Hesse
Christian Charles	18 September 1757; First son of Christian John and Christiana Franziska Eleonora of Salm-Grumbach	20 February 1770 – 1793 1803 – 12 July 1806	County of Elder Leiningen (in Ilbenstadt and Engelthal Abbeys since 1803)	Unmarried	1 December 1811 aged 54	In the aftermath of the French Revolution (1793), the county was annexed to France. They were given as compensation, in 1803, the abbeys of Ilbenstadt and Engelthal, possessions that in 1806 were mediatised.
Frederick Louis	2 November 1761; Altleiningen; Fourth son of Christian John and Christiana Franziska Eleonora of Salm-Grumbach	20 February 1770 – 1793 1803 – 12 July 1806	County of Elder Leiningen (in Ilbenstadt and Engelthal Abbeys since 1803)	Charlotte Bernhardina of Zech-Rautenburg (1777–1814); 1792 (annulled 1798) no children Eleonora Maria Breitwieser (2 January 1781 – 24 November 1841); 1813 eight children	9 August 1839 aged 77	In the aftermath of the French Revolution (1793), the county was annexed to France. They were given as compensation, in 1803, the abbeys of Ilbenstadt and Engelthal, possessions that in 1806 were mediatised.
Altleiningen annexed to France (1793-1806); Mediatised to the Grand Duchies of Berg and Hesse, and the Nassau Principalities of Weilburg and Usingen (from 1806)
Charles Gustav	28 June 1747; Son of George Charles and Johanna Elisabeth Amalia of Isenburg-Philippseich	19 March 1787 – 1793	County of Younger Leiningen	Unmarried	7 June 1798 aged 50	Cousins, ruled jointly. In the aftermath of the French Revolution (1793), the county was annexed to France.
Charles Joseph	13 August 1739; Son of George Ernest and Maria Louise of Wieser	19 March 1787 – 1793	County of Younger Leiningen	Maria Friederika Wilhelmina Elisabeth Schmittener (22 May 1753 – 29 April 1828); 1782 six children	27 July 1797 aged 56	Cousins, ruled jointly. In the aftermath of the French Revolution (1793), the county was annexed to France.
Altleiningen annexed to France (1793-1806); Mediatised to the Grand Duchies of Berg and Hesse, and the Nassau Principalities of Weilburg and Usingen (from 1806)

=== The post-mediatization ===
==== Succession in the Principality of Leiningen ====
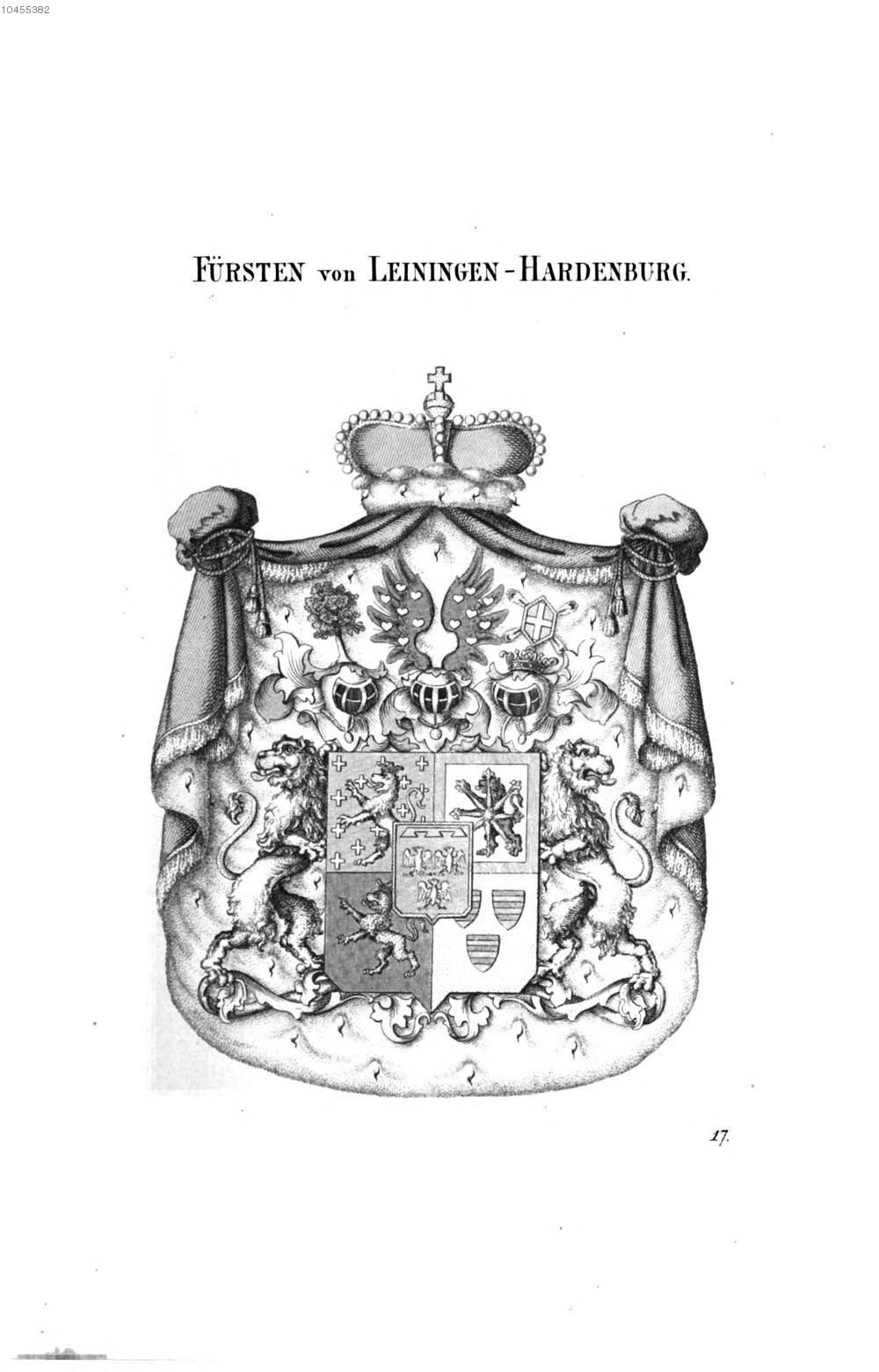
The princely arms in the mid 19th century

- Carl Friedrich Wilhelm, 1st Prince of Leiningen (1724–1807)
- Emich Carl, 2nd Prince of Leiningen (1763–1814)
- Carl, 3rd Prince of Leiningen (1804–1856)
- Ernst, 4th Prince of Leiningen (1830–1904)
- Emich, 5th Prince of Leiningen (1866–1939)
- Karl, 6th Prince of Leiningen (1898–1946)
- Emich, 7th Prince of Leiningen (1926–1991)
- Andreas, 8th Prince of Leiningen (born 1955)
  - his heir-apparent, Ferdinand, Hereditary Prince of Leiningen (born 1982)

==== Succession in the County of Altleiningen ====
- Christian Karl, Count of Leiningen-Altleiningen (18 September 1757 – 1 December 1811)
- Friedrich I Ludwig Christian, Count of Leiningen-Altleiningen (2 November 1761 – 9 August 1839)
- Friedrich II Eduard, Count of Leiningen-Altleiningen (20 May 1806 – 5 June 1868)
- Friedrich III Wipprecht Franz, Count of Leiningen-Altleiningen (30 December 1852 – 7 February 1916), nephew
- Gustav Friedrich Oskar, Count of Leiningen-Altleiningen (8 February 1876 – 23 July 1929)

==== Succession in the County of Neuleiningen ====
- Ferdinand Karl III, Count of Leiningen-Neuleiningen (8 September 1767 – 26 November 1813)
- August George Gustav, Count of Leiningen-Neuleiningen (19 February 1770 – 9 October 1849)
- Christian Franz Seraph Vincenz, Count of Leiningen-Neuleiningen (1810 – 1856)
- George Karl August, Count of Leiningen-Neuleiningen (27 August 1789 – 17 March 1865), cousin of the previous
- Wilhelm, Count of Leiningen-Neuleiningen (16 February 1824 – 29 April 1887) - Inherited by Altleiningen

== See also ==
- House of Leiningen
- Prince of Leiningen
- Princess of Leiningen
