= Leiningen family =

German noble family

Coordinates: 49°32′24″N 8°08′24″E

Leiningen
- German noble family
- Arms of the Leiningen family
- Country: Holy Roman Empire
- Origin: Leiningerland
- Founded: 12th century
- Founder: Emich II, Count of Leiningen
- Current head: Andreas, Prince of Leiningen
- Final ruler: Emich, Prince of Leiningen
- Titles: Count of Leiningen; Prince of Leiningen
- Deposition: 1806 (Mediatised); 1918 (abolishment of the monarchy)
- Website: https://fuerst-leiningen.de/

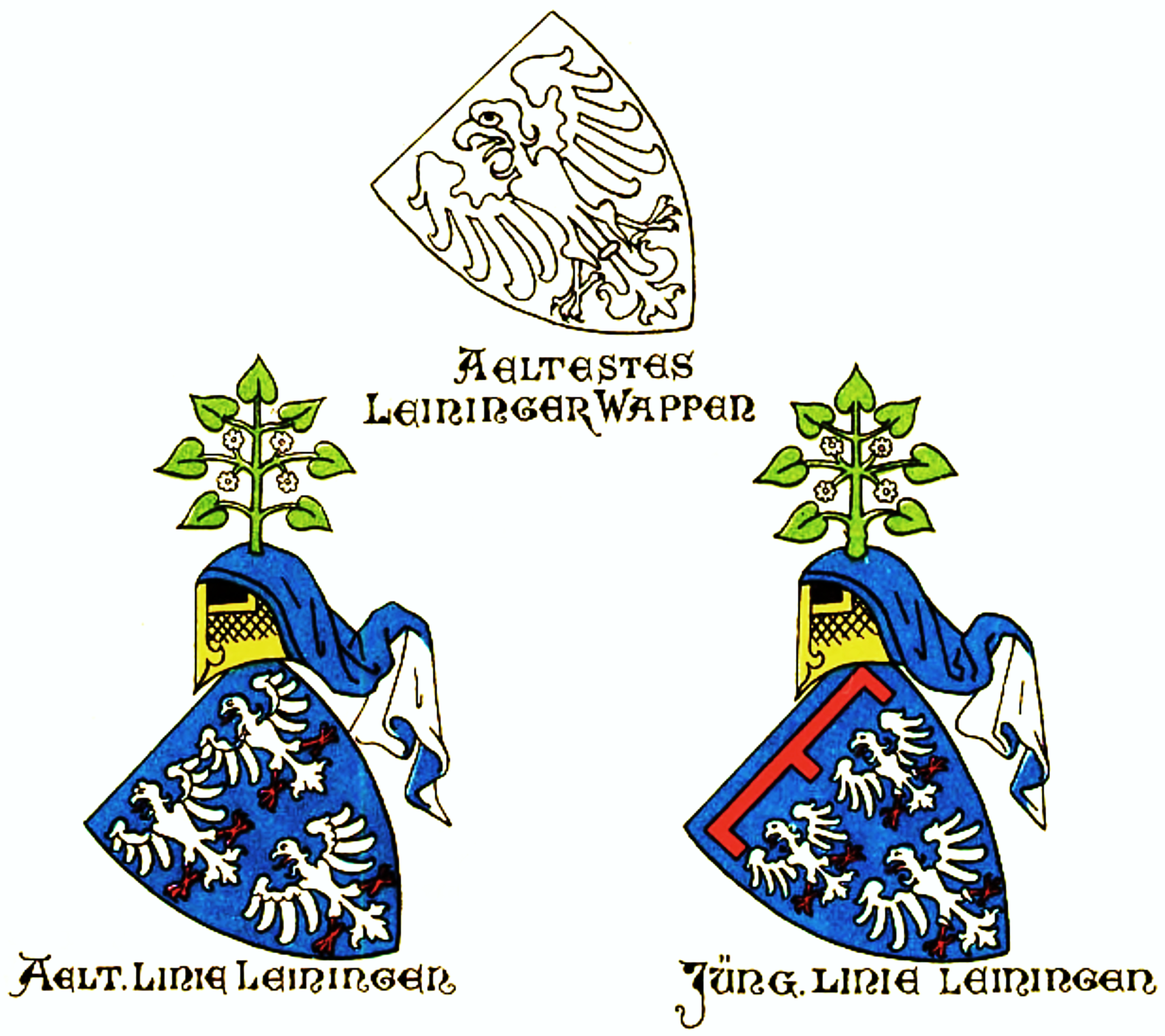
Evolution of the Leiningen arms

The House of Leiningen is an ancient (uradel) German noble family whose lands lay principally in Alsace, Lorraine, Saarland, Rhineland, and the Palatinate. Various branches of this family developed over the centuries and ruled counties with Imperial immediacy.

== Origins ==
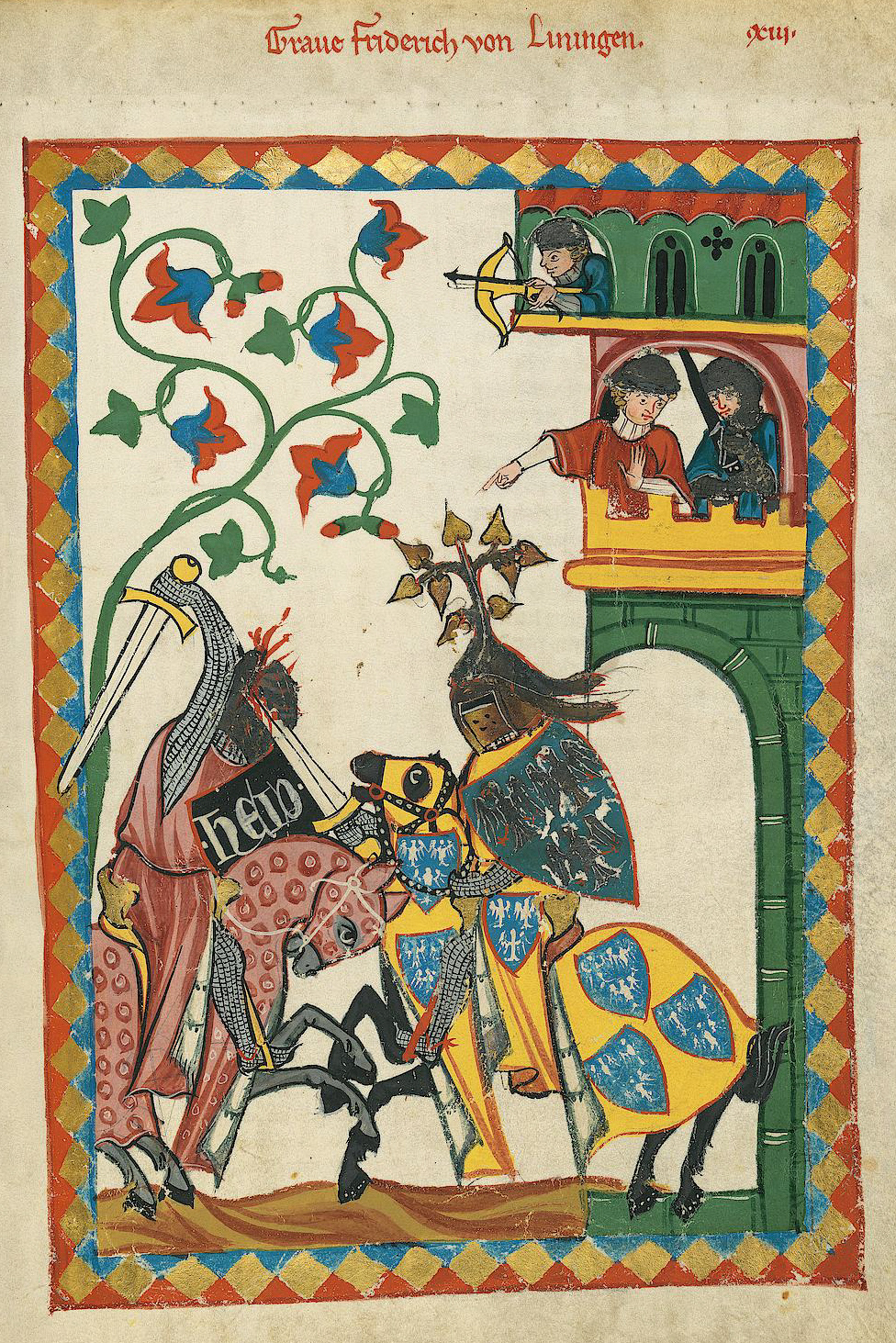
Count Frederick II (d. 1237)

The first count of Leiningen about whom anything definite is known was a certain Emich II (d. before 1138). He (and perhaps his father Emich I) built Leiningen Castle, which is now known as "Old Leiningen Castle" (German: Burg Altleiningen), around 1100 to 1110. Nearby Höningen Abbey was built around 1120 as the family's burial place.

This family became extinct in the male line when Count Frederick I died about 1220. Frederick I's sister, Liutgarde, married Simon II, Count of Saarbrücken. One of Liutgarde's sons, also named Frederick, inherited the lands of the counts of Leiningen, and he took their arms and their name as Frederick II (d. 1237). He became known as a Minnesinger, and one of his songs was included in the Codex Manesse. Before 1212, he built himself a new castle called Hardenburg, about 10 kilometers south of Altleiningen. This was outside the county of Leiningen on the territory of Limburg Abbey, of which his uncle was the overlord (Vogt), which caused some trouble.

His eldest son, Simon (c. 1204–1234), married Gertrude, heiress of the County of Dagsburg, bringing that property into the family. They had no children and Simon's two brothers inherited the county of Leiningen together: Frederick III (d. 1287) also inherited Dagsburg and Emich IV (d. c. 1276) Landeck Castle; he founded the town of Landau, but the Landeck branch extinguished with his grandson in 1290. Frederick III, who disliked sharing Leiningen castle with his brother, had a new castle built in 1238–41 about 5 kilometres northeast of Leiningen, called Neuleiningen Castle ("New Leiningen"). Frederick III's son, Frederick IV (d. 1316), had two sons, who divided the county into Leiningen-Dagsburg and Leiningen-Hardenburg.

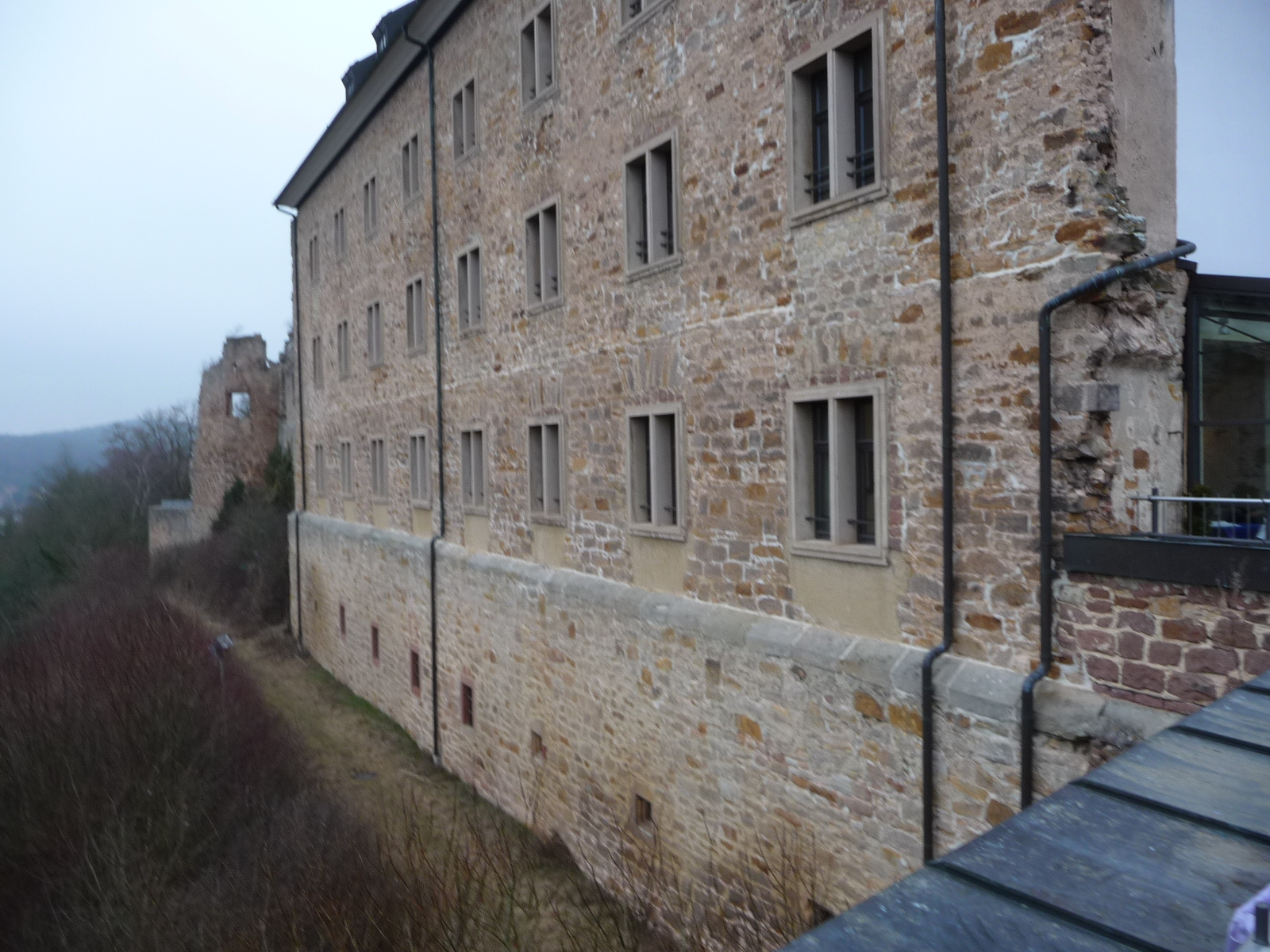
Altleiningen Castle

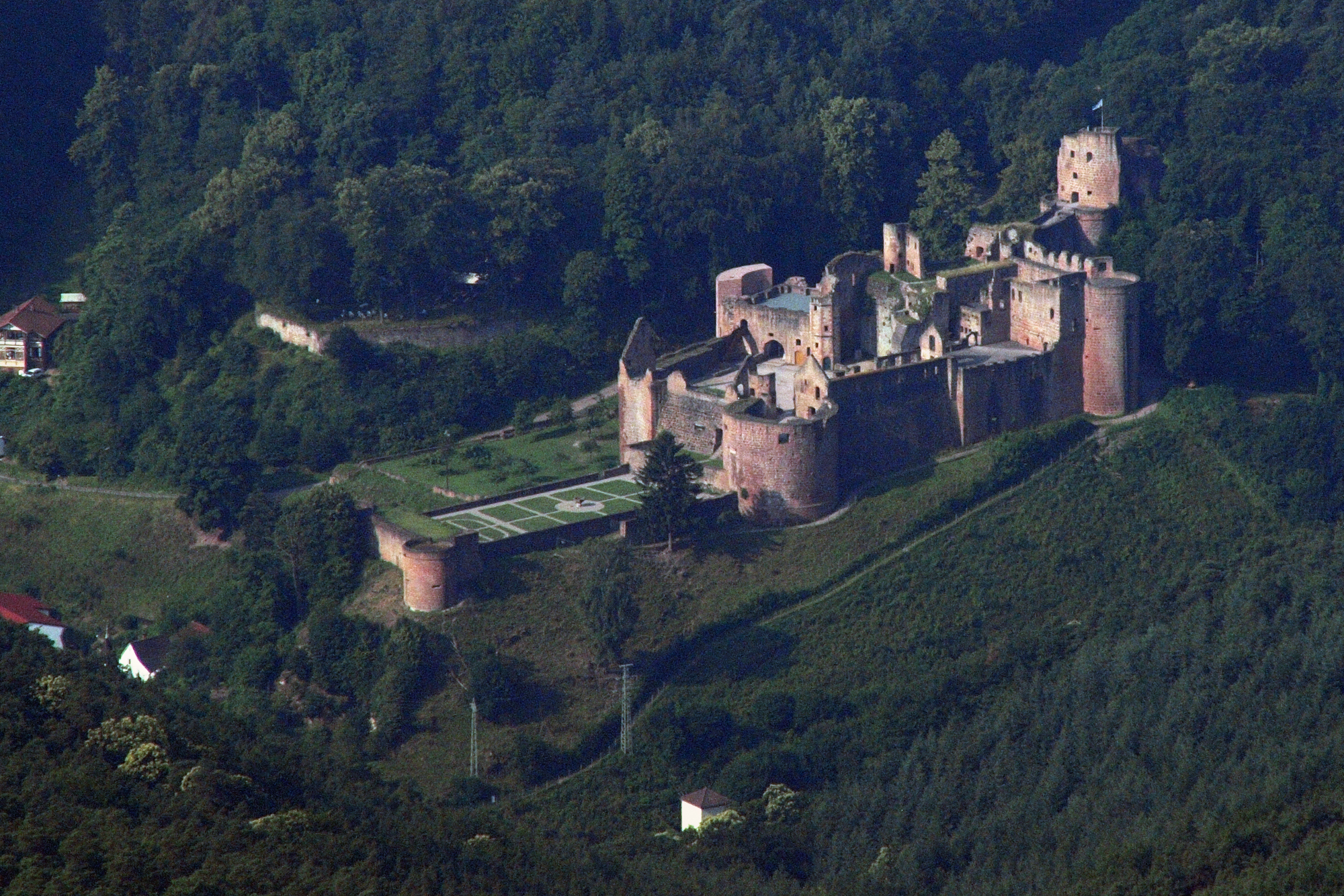
Hardenburg Castle

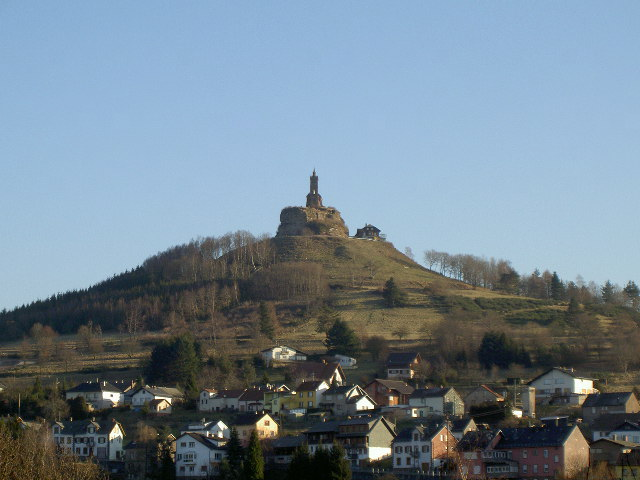
Dagsburg Castle

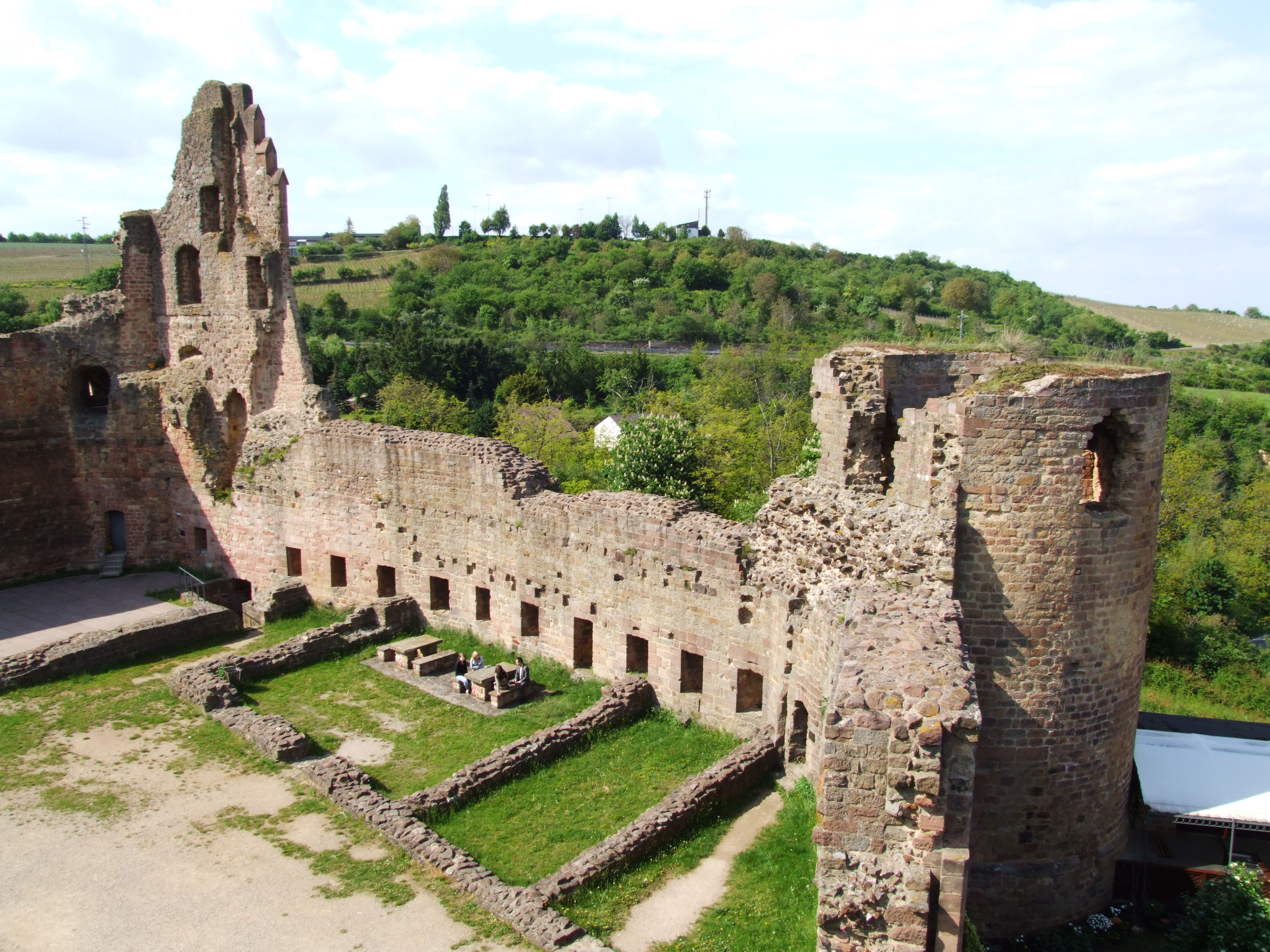
Neuleiningen Castle

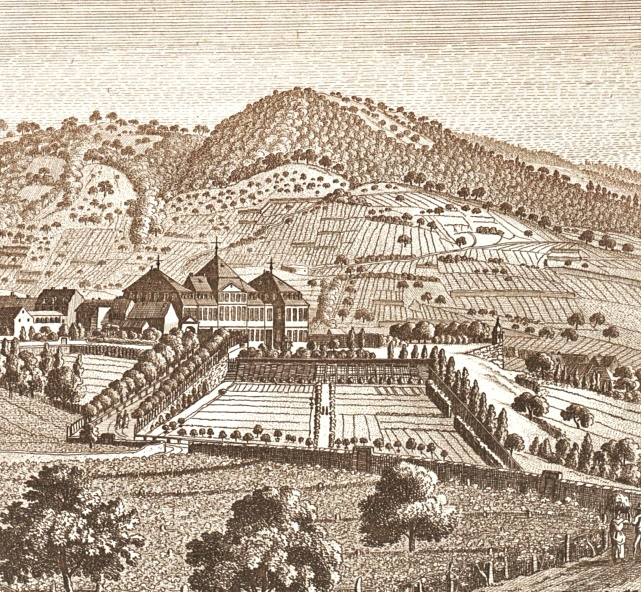
Schloss Dürkheim

== Line of Descent ==
Note that different sources use different sequence numbers for some of the Counts. For consistency across sources, dates of birth and death are useful.

=== Earliest Counts ===
- The Count Emicho from the Hebrew Chronicles was

the Count of Flonheim. He is often mistaken for Count Emicho of Leiningen, who was not involved in any of the Crusades but did in fact live during this time period.

- Emich I was Count of Leiningen in 1127, but it is unclear when he died, or his relation to the other counts.
- Emich II is attested as Count of Leiningen in documents from 1143 to 1179
  - His son, Friedrich I had taken over the county by 1189
- Emich III is attested as Count of Leiningen in documents from 1193 through 1208, though it is unclear his relationship to the previous Counts
- Friedrich I, cousin of Emich III, was recorded as junior count under Emich in 1205, and as count in his own right from 1210 to 1217. A document from 1220 refers to his widow.

=== Saarbrücken Line ===
- Simon II, Count of Saarbrücken married Liutgarde, the heiress of Leiningen whose descent from the original counts of Leiningen is unclear
  - Their son, Friedrich II (d. 1237) inherited the County of Leiningen
    - His son, Simon (c. 1204 – 16 Mar 1234) married Gertrude, heiress of the County of Dagsburg, bringing that property into the family.
    - Friedrich III, son of Friedrich II, (d. 1287) was attested as count in documents from 1239 and 1249, and married Adelheid of Kyburg
      - Their son, Friedrich IV (d. 1316), whose sons divided the County into Leiningen-Dagsburg and Leiningen-Hartenburg.
    - Emich IV, brother of Friedrich III (d. c. 1276) ruled a portion of the lands at Leiningen-Landeck
      - His son, Emich V (d. 1289), Count of Leiningen-Landeck had no heir.
      - Agnes (d. between 1299 and 1303) married Otto I, Count of Nassau
      - Kunigunde (d. 1311) married Heinrich I of Salm-Blamont (d. 1331)

=== Leiningen-Dagsburg (First Line) ===
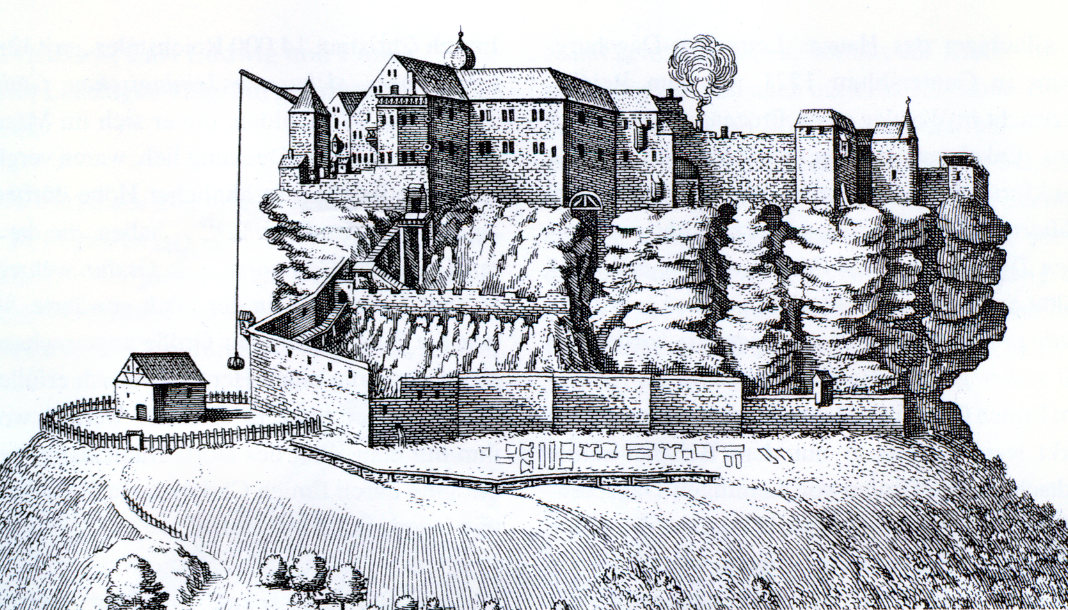
Dagsburg Castle (1663)

- Friedrich V (d. 1327), son of Friedrich IV, became Count of Leiningen-Dagsburg, today Dagsbourg at Dabo, Moselle, Lorraine (France)
  - Friedrich VI, Count of Leiningen-Dagsburg (d. before 1342)
    - Friedrich VII, Count of Leiningen-Dagsburg (d. before 1378)
    - Friedrich VIII, Count of Leiningen-Dagsburg (1320 – 31 Oct 1387) married Jolanda of Jülich, granddaughter of Gerhard V of Jülich.
      - Yolantha (1352 – 24 Apr 1434). Her descendants include the Lords of Egmont and the Dukes of Guelders
      - Friedrich IX, Count of Leiningen-Dagsburg
        - Hesso, Count of Leiningen-Dagsburg, married Elisabeth, daughter of Ernest, Duke of Bavaria (d. 1467)
        - Margaret, married Reinhard III of Westerburg

=== Leiningen-Westerburg ===
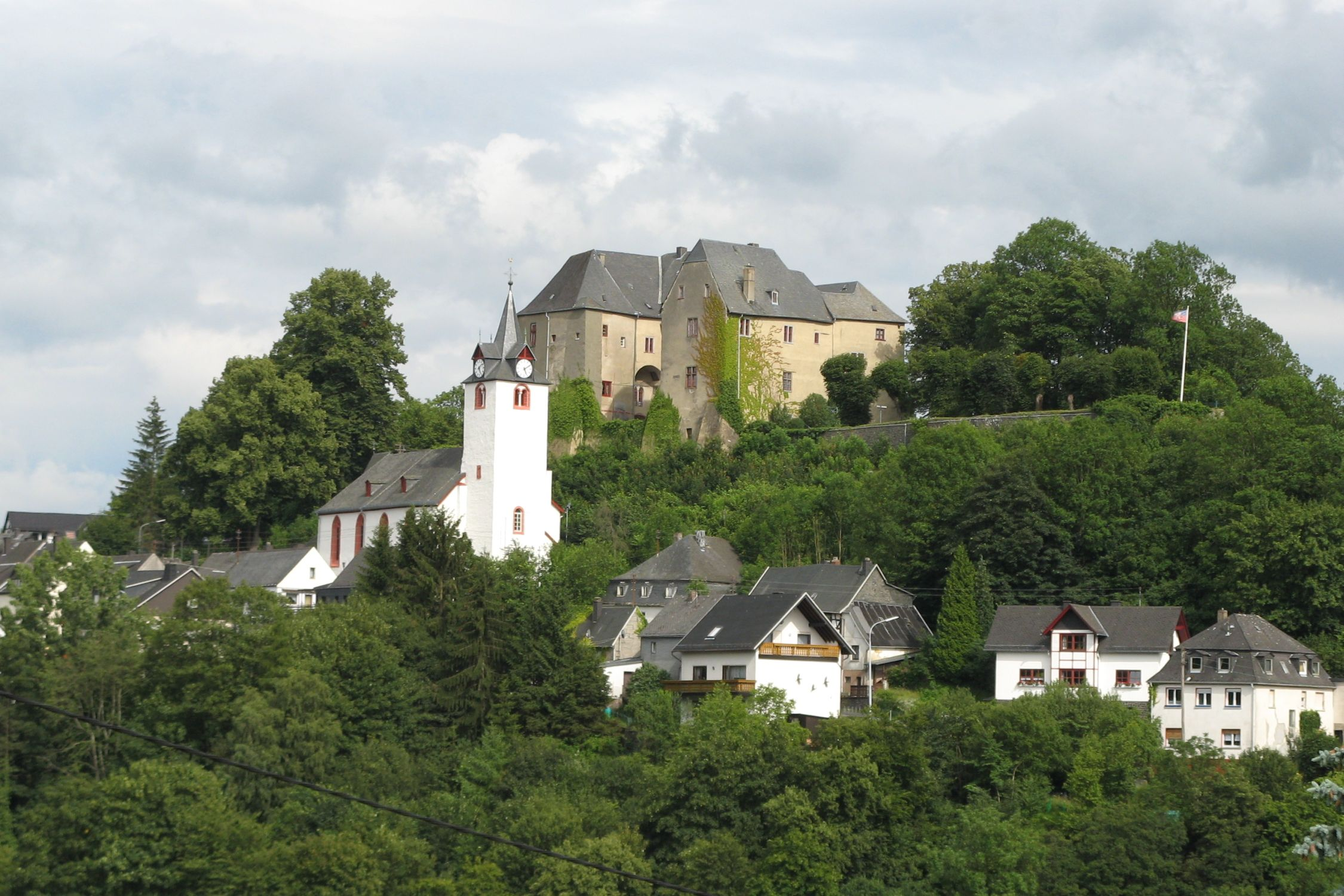
Westerburg

- Kuno I, Lord of Westerburg (1425–1459), was the son of Margaret of Leiningen and Reinhard of Westerburg
  - Reinhard I, Count of Leiningen-Westerburg (1453–1522) inherited the county from his grandmother.
    - Kuno II, Count of Leiningen-Westerburg (1487–1547)
      - Philipp I, Count of Leiningen-Leiningen (1527–1597)
      - George I, Count of Leiningen-Schaumburg (1533–1586)
      - Reinhard II, Count of Leiningen-Westerburg (1530–1584)
        - Albrecht Philipp, Count of Leiningen-Westerburg (1567–1597)
        - Johann Ludwig, Count of Leiningen-Westerburg (1572–1597), last of this branch.

This county was then absorbed into Leiningen-Schaumburg.

=== Leiningen-Leiningen ===
- Philipp I, Count of Leiningen-Leiningen (1527–1597), son of Kuno II, Count of Leiningen-Westerburg
  - Ludwig, Count of Leiningen-Leiningen (1557–1622) married Bernardine of Lippe
    - Johann Kasimir, Count of Leiningen-Leiningen (1587–1635)
    - Philipp II, Count of Leiningen-Leiningen (1591–1668)
      - Ludwig Eberhard, Count of Leiningen-Leiningen (1624–1688) married Charlotte, daughter of William Louis, Count of Nassau-Saarbrücken
        - Philipp Ludwig, Count of Leiningen-Leiningen (1652–1705)
    - Ludwig Emich, Count of Leiningen-Leiningen (1595–1635)
      - Johann Ludwig, Count of Leiningen-Leiningen (1625–1665)

This branch ended in 1705, and this county was also absorbed into Leiningen-Schaumburg.

=== Leiningen-Schaumburg ===
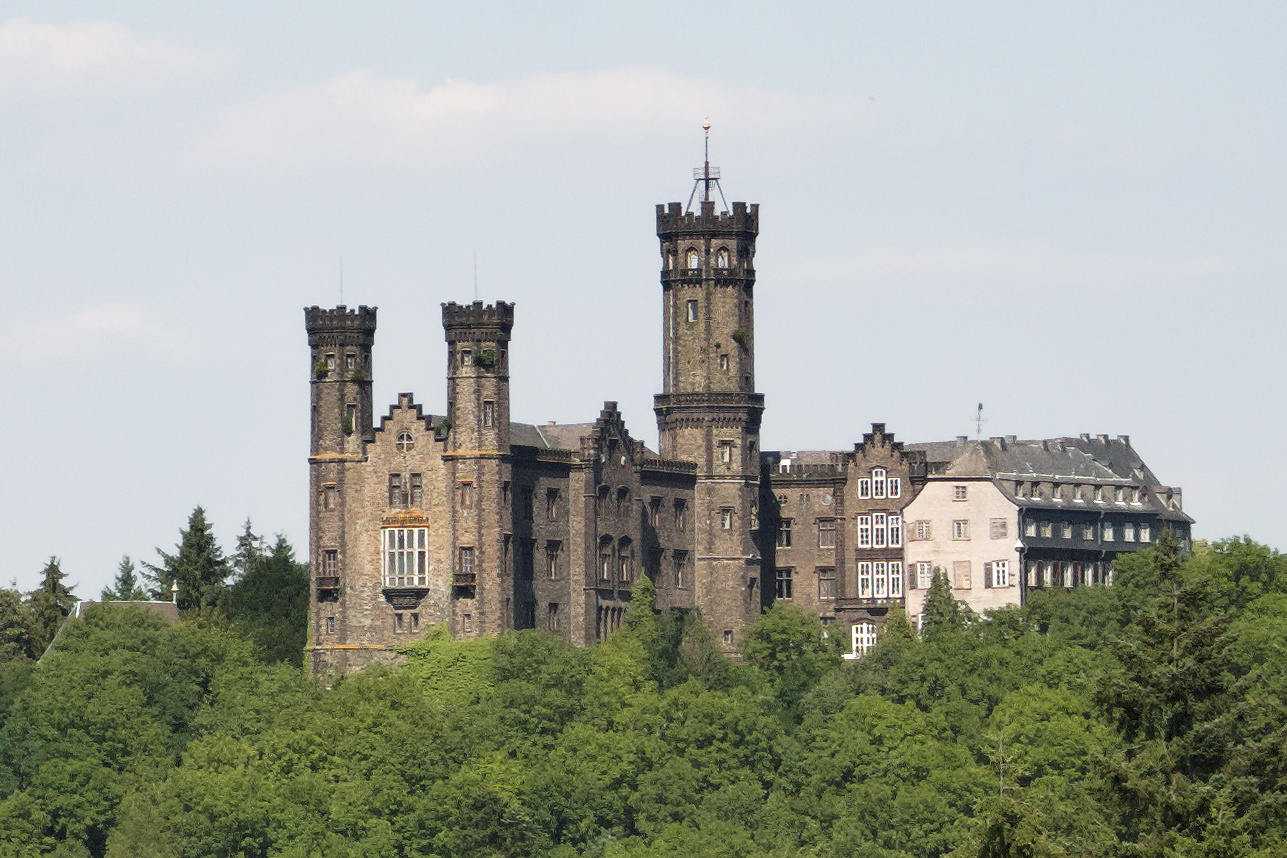
Schaumburg Castle

- George I, Count of Leiningen-Schaumburg (1533–1586), son of Kuno II, Count of Leiningen-Westerburg
  - Philipp Jakob, Count of Leiningen-Schaumburg (1572–1612)
  - Reinhard II, Count of Leiningen-Schaumburg (1574–1655)
  - Christoph, Count of Leiningen-Schaumburg (1575–1635)
    - Margaret Elisabeth (30 June 1604 – 13 August 1667) married Frederick I, Landgrave of Hesse-Homburg
    - Philipp Ludwig, Count of Leiningen-Schaumburg (1617–1637)
    - George Wilhelm, Count of Leiningen-Schaumburg (1619–1695)
      - Johann Anton, Count of Leiningen-Schaumburg (15 Jan 1655 – 2 Oct 1698)
        - George Friedrich, Count of Leiningen-Schaumburg (5 Feb 1693 – 6 Oct 1708)
      - Christoph Christian, Count of Leiningen-Altleiningen (11 Mar 1656 – 17 May 1728)
      - George II Karl Ludwig, Count of Leiningen-Neuleiningen (2 Mar 1666 – 4 Oct 1726)

=== Leiningen-Westerburg-Altleiningen ===
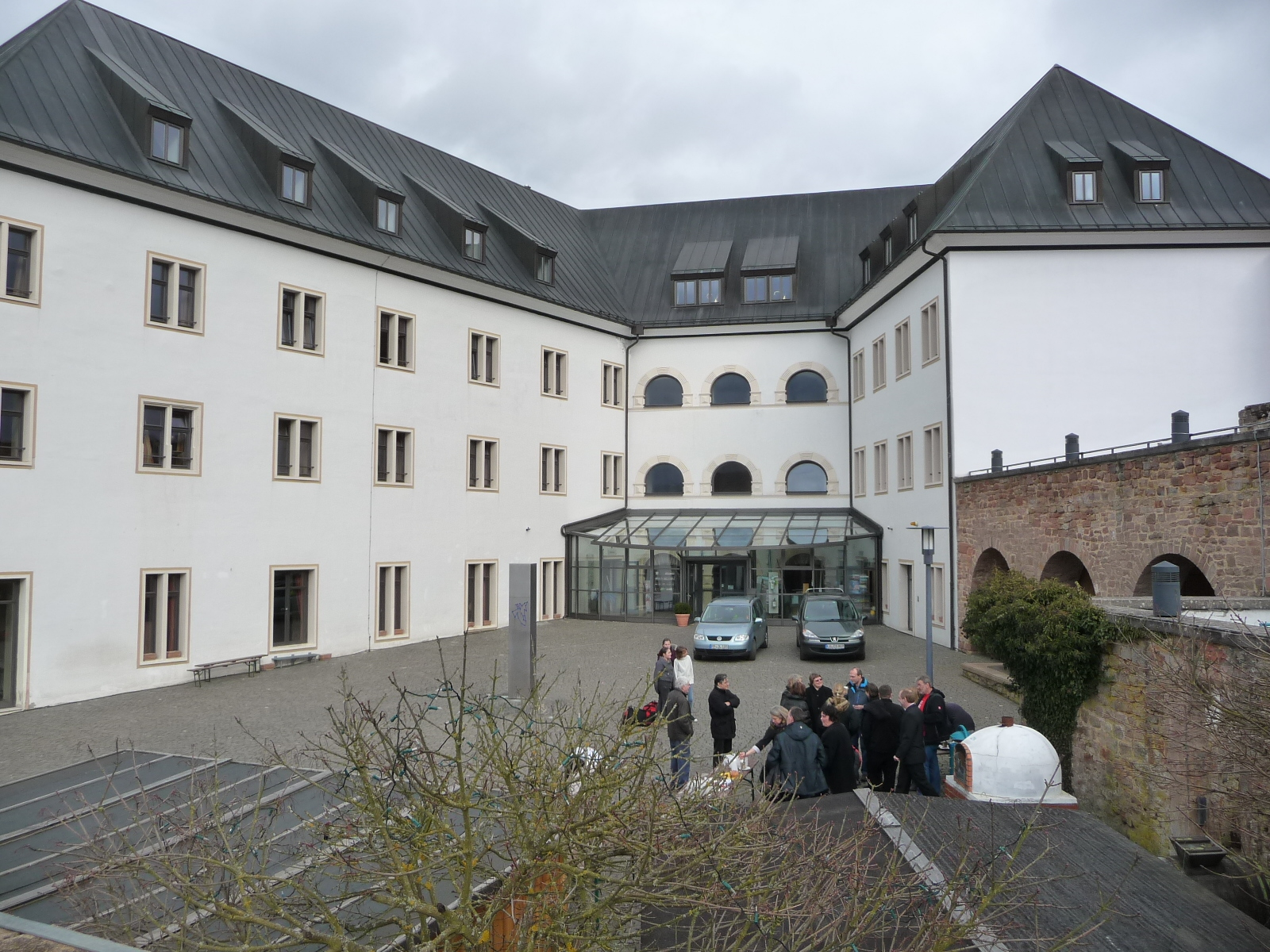
Altleiningen Castle

- Christoph Christian, Count of Leiningen-Altleiningen (11 Mar 1656 – 17 May 1728), son of George Wilhelm, Count of Leiningen-Schaumburg
  - George Hermann, Count of Leiningen-Altleiningen (21 Mar 1679 – 4 Feb 1751)
    - Christian Johann, Count of Leiningen-Altleiningen (31 Aug 1730 – 20 Feb 1770)
      - Christian Karl, Count of Leiningen-Altleiningen (18 Sep 1757 – 1 Dec 1811)
      - Friedrich I Ludwig Christian, Count of Leiningen-Altleiningen (2 Nov 1761 – 9 Aug 1839)
        - Friedrich II Eduard, Count of Leiningen-Altleiningen (20 May 1806 – 5 Jun 1868)
        - Károly Leiningen-Westerburg
        - Johann Ludwig (6 Jun 1807 – 31 Oct 1864)
          - Friedrich III Wipprecht Franz, Count of Leiningen-Altleiningen (30 Dec 1852 – 7 Feb 1916)
            - Gustav Friedrich Oskar, Count of Leiningen-Altleiningen (8 Feb 1876 – 23 Jul 1929)

=== Leiningen-Westerburg-Neuleiningen ===
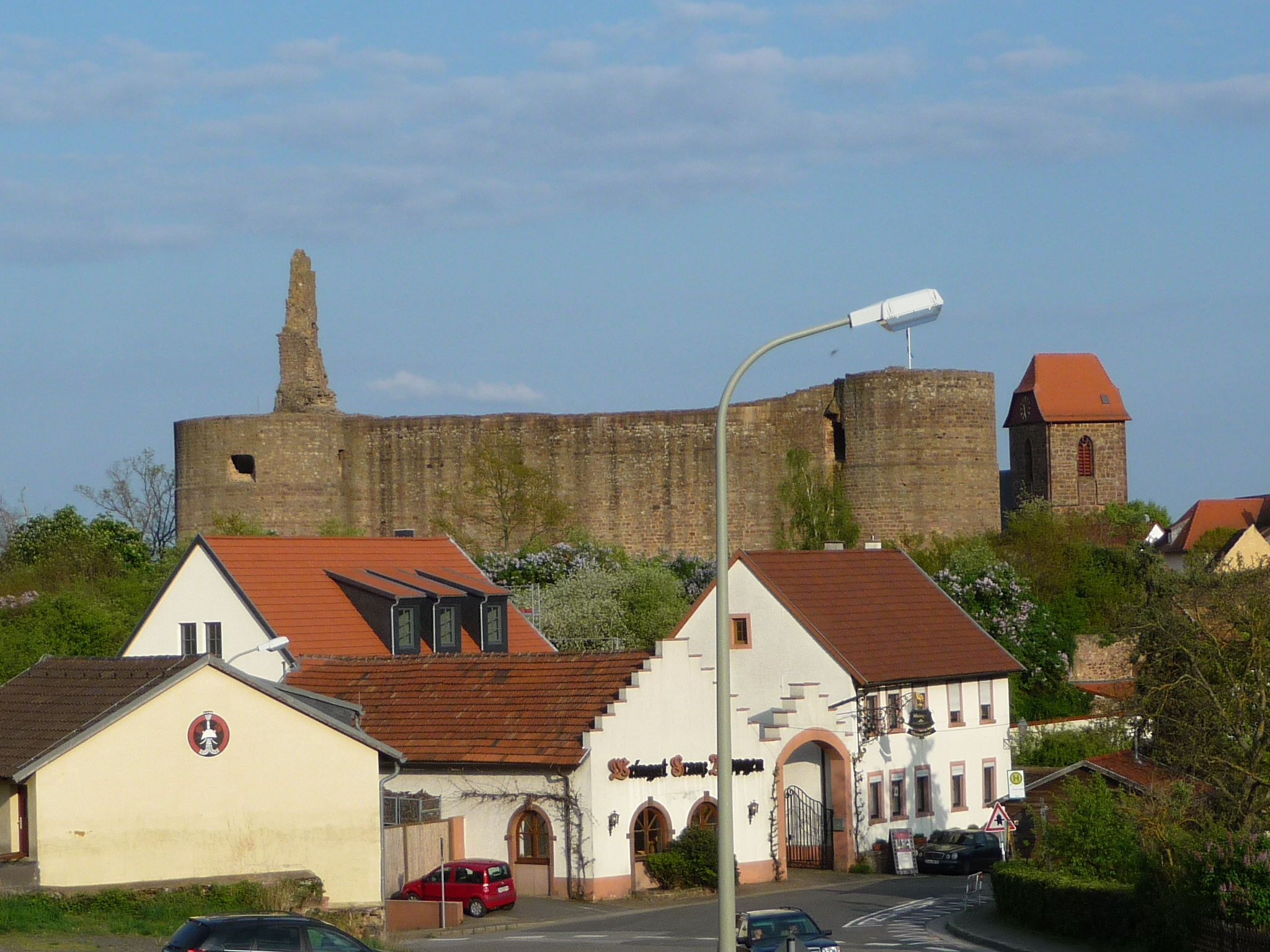
Neuleiningen Castle

- George II Karl Ludwig, Count of Leiningen-Neuleiningen (2 Mar 1666 – 4 Oct 1726), son of George Wilhelm, Count of Leiningen-Schaumburg
  - George Karl I August Ludwig, Count of Leiningen-Neuleiningen (Nassau Line) (17 Feb 1717 – 19 Mar 1787)
    - Karl II Gustav Reinhard Waldemar, Count of Leiningen-Neuleiningen (28 Jun 1747 – 7 Jun 1798)
      - Ferdinand Karl III, Count of Leiningen-Neuleiningen (8 Sep 1767 – 26 Nov 1813)
      - August George Gustav, Count of Leiningen-Neuleiningen (19 Feb 1770 – 9 Oct 1849)
        - Christian Franz Seraph Vincenz, Count of Leiningen-Neuleiningen (1810 – 1856)
  - George Ernst Ludwig (Bavaria Line) (3 May 1718 – 24 Dec 1765)
    - Karl IV Joseph Philipp Ludwig Ernst, Count of Leiningen-Neuleiningen (13 Aug 1739 – 27 Jul 1797)
      - George Karl August, Count of Leiningen-Neuleiningen (27 Aug 1789 – 17 Mar 1865)
        - Wilhelm, Count of Leiningen-Neuleiningen (16 Feb 1824 – 29 Apr 1887)

=== Leiningen-Hardenburg ===
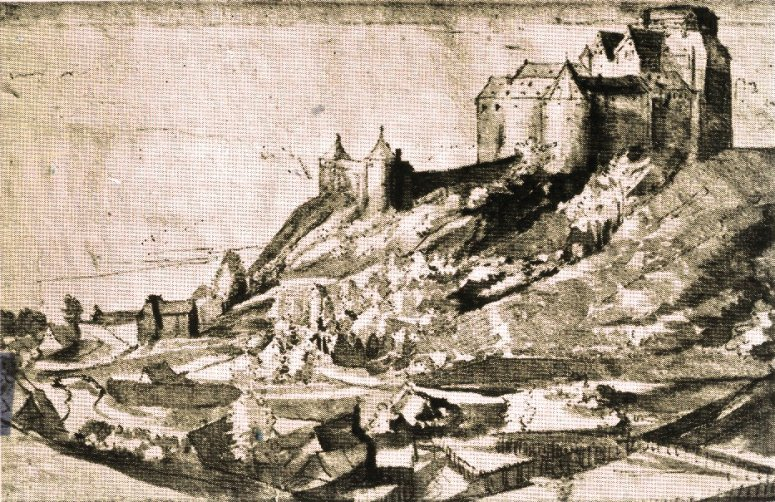
Hardenburg Castle (1580)

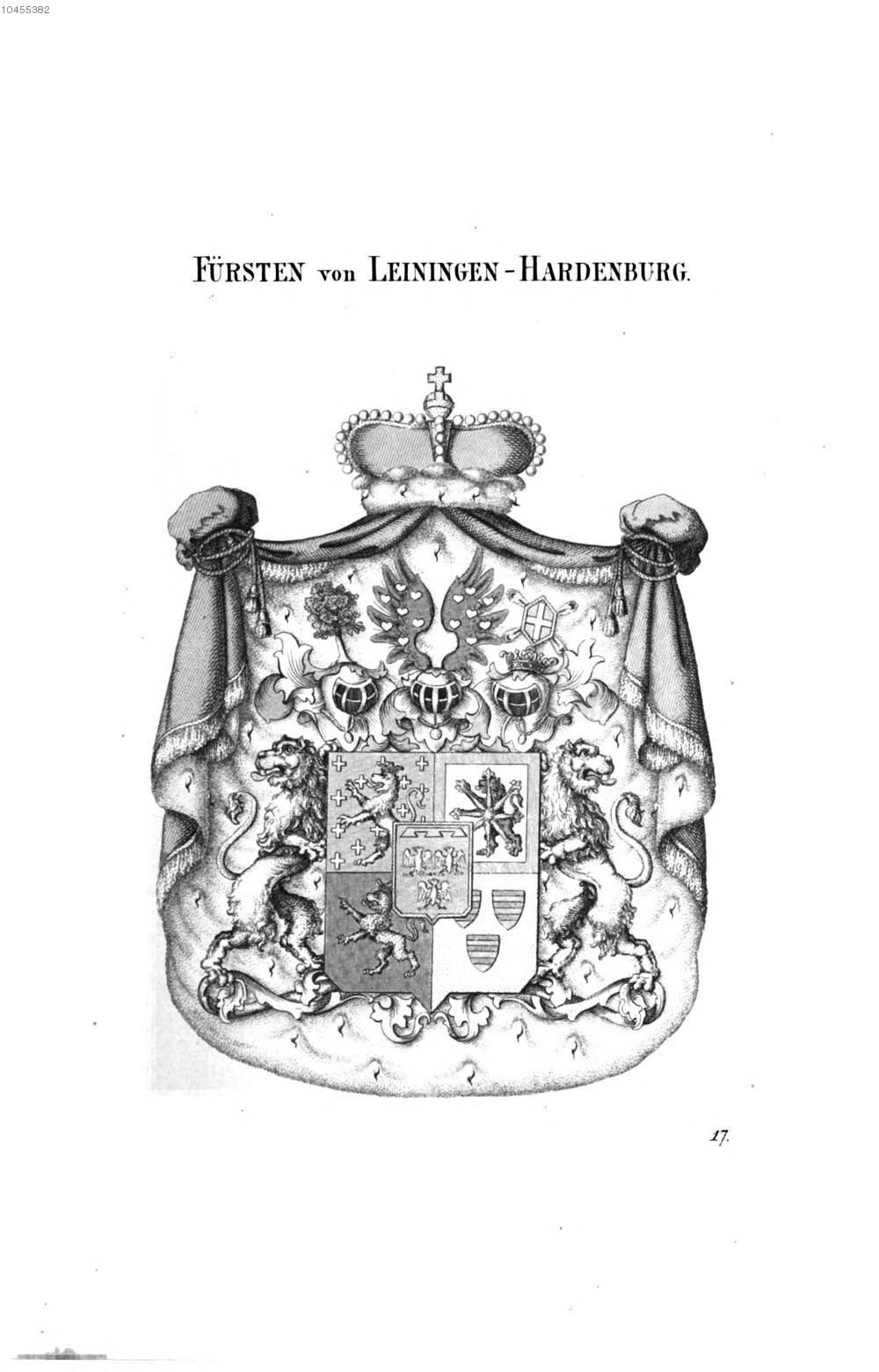
Arms of the Princes of Leiningen

- Gottfried, son of Friedrich IV, inherited the portion of Leiningen ruled from Hardenburg
  - His son Friedrich married Joan of Rixingen, and their children became Counts of Leiningen-Rixingen, which lasted until 1506
  - Gottfried's other son became Emich VI, Count of Leiningen-Hardenburg
    - Emich VII, Count of Leiningen-Hardenburg (d. 1452) married Beatrix Zähringen, daughter of Bernard I, Margrave of Baden-Baden
      - Emich VIII, Count of Leiningen-Hardenburg (d. 30 Mar 1495)
        - Emich IX, Count of Leiningen-Hardenburg (d. 18 Feb 1535)
          - Katharina (-1585) married Philip II, Count of Nassau-Saarbrücken
          - Emich X, Count of Leiningen-Hardenburg (d. 10 Jan 1541)
            - Emich XI, Count of Leiningen-Dagsburg (starting the second line in that part of the county) (1540–1593)
            - Johann Philipp I, Count of Leiningen-Hardenburg (25 Dec 1539 – 8 Sep 1562)
              - Emich XII, Count of Leiningen-Hardenburg (4 Nov 1562 – 24 Nov 1607) married Marie of Wittelsbach, daughter of Wolfgang, Count Palatine of Zweibrücken
                - Johann Philipp II, Count of Leiningen-Hardenburg (16 Apr 1588 – 15 Apr 1643) married Elisabeth of Leiningen-Dagsburg, daughter of Emich XI.
                  - Friedrich Emich, Count of Leiningen-Hardenburg (9 Feb 1621 – 26 Jul 1698)
                    - Marie Polyxena (7 Feb 1662 – 22 Apr 1725) married John Ernst, Count of Nassau-Weilburg
                    - Emich XIV, Count of Leiningen-Hardenburg (6 Feb 1649 – 12 Dec 1684) married Charlotte Sophie of Baden-Durlach, daughter of Margrave Charles Magnus of Baden-Durlach
                    - Johann Friedrich, Count of Leiningen-Hardenburg (18 Mar 1661 – 9 Feb 1722) married Katharina of Baden-Durlach, daughter of Frederick VII, Margrave of Baden-Durlach
                      - Friedrich Magnus, Count of Leiningen-Hardenburg (27 Mar 1703 – 28 Oct 1756)
                        - Karl Friedrich Wilhelm, Prince of Leiningen (14 Aug 1724 – 9 Jan 1807)
                          - For descendants, see: Prince of Leiningen

=== Leiningen-Dagsburg (Second Line) ===
- Emich XI, Count of Leiningen-Dagsburg (1540–1593), son of Emich X, Count of Leiningen-Hartenburg
  - Elisabeth (6 May 1586 – 25 Oct 1623), married her great-nephew Johann Philipp II, Count of Leiningen-Hartenburg
  - Philip George, Count of Leiningen-Dagsburg (25 Jul 1582 – 6 Feb 1627)
    - Anna (25 May 1625 – 24 Dec 1688) married John, Count of Nassau-Idstein
  - Johann Ludwig, Count of Leiningen-Dagsburg-Falkenburg (8 May 1579 – 19 Jun 1625)
    - Emich XIII, Count of Leiningen-Dagsburg-Falkenburg (12 Jun 1612 – 1658)
      - Juliane Alexandrine married George III, Landgrave of Hesse-Itter and Charles, Landgrave of Hesse-Wanfried
      - George William, Count of Leiningen-Dagsburg-Falkenburg (8 Mar 1636 – 18 Jul 1672)
        - Johann, Count of Leiningen-Dagsburg-Falkenburg (19 Mar 1662 – 13 Nov 1698) married Countess Johanna Magdalene of Hanau-Lichtenberg
          - Christian Karl Reinhard of Leiningen-Dachsburg-Falkenburg-Heidesheim (17 Jul 1695 – 17 Nov 1766)
            - Countess Caroline Felizitas of Leiningen-Dagsburg (22 May 1734 – 8 May 1810)
            - Countess Maria Louise Albertine of Leiningen-Falkenburg-Dagsburg (16 March 1729 – 11 March 1818)
      - Emich Christian of Leiningen-Dagsburg (29 March 1642 – 27 April 1702)
        - Elisabeth Dorothea Wilhelmine (11 June 1665 – 1722) married Count Moritz Hermann of Limburg-Stirum
      - Johann Ludwig I, Count of Leiningen-Dagsburg-Falkenburg in Guntersblum (1643 – 1687)
        - Johann Ludwig II, Count of Leiningen-Dagsburg-Falkenburg in Guntersblum (1673 – 1699)
          - Johann Franz, Count of Leiningen-Dagsburg-Falkenburg in Guntersblum (1698 – 1750)
            - Wilhelm Carl zu Leiningen-Guntersblum (1737 – 1809)
              - Karl Theodor zu Leiningen-Billigheim (1794 – 1869)
                - Karl Wenzel zu Leiningen-Billigheim (1823 – 1900)

== Further historical family seats ==
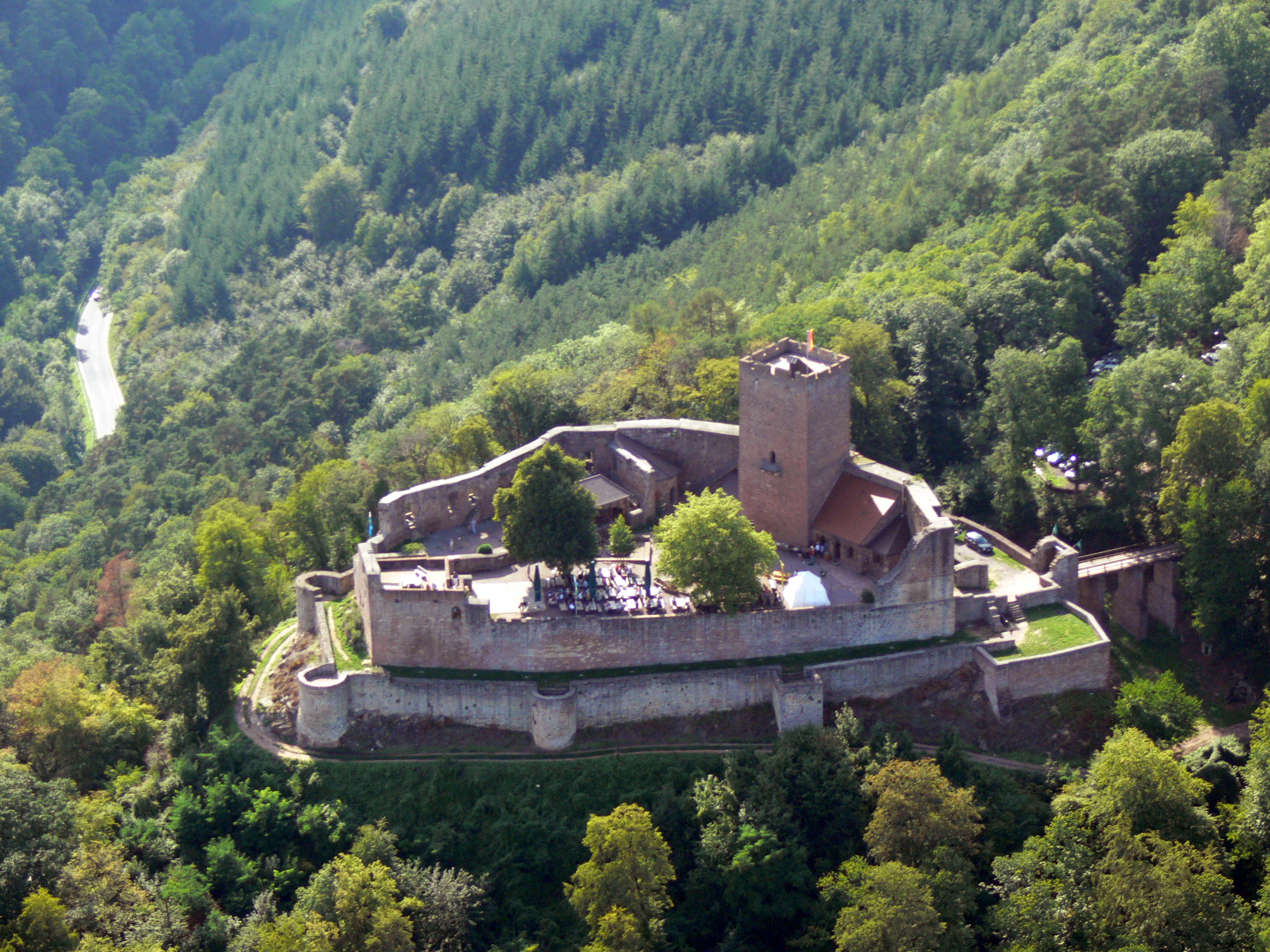
Landeck Castle, Landau

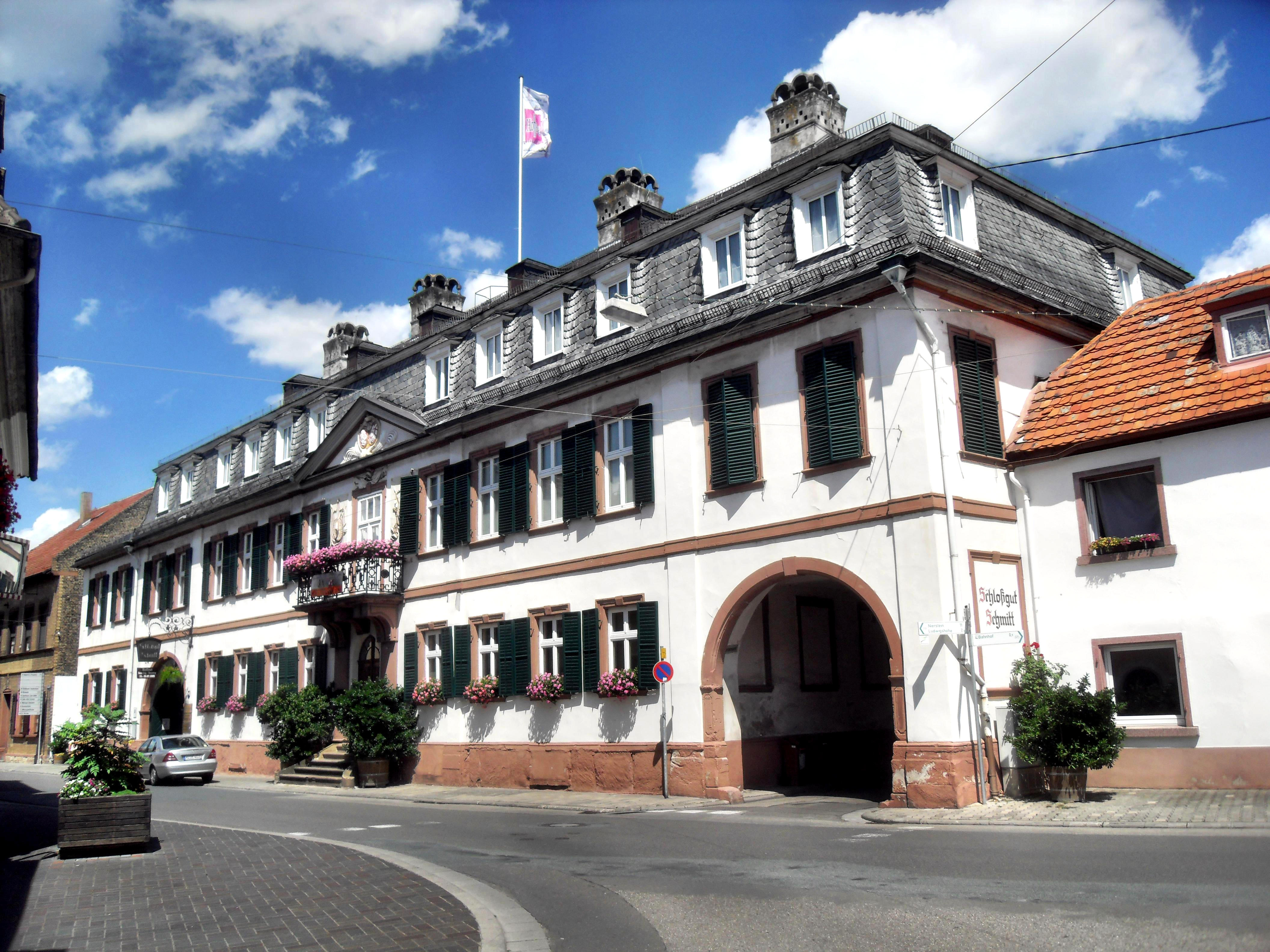
Guntersblum Castle

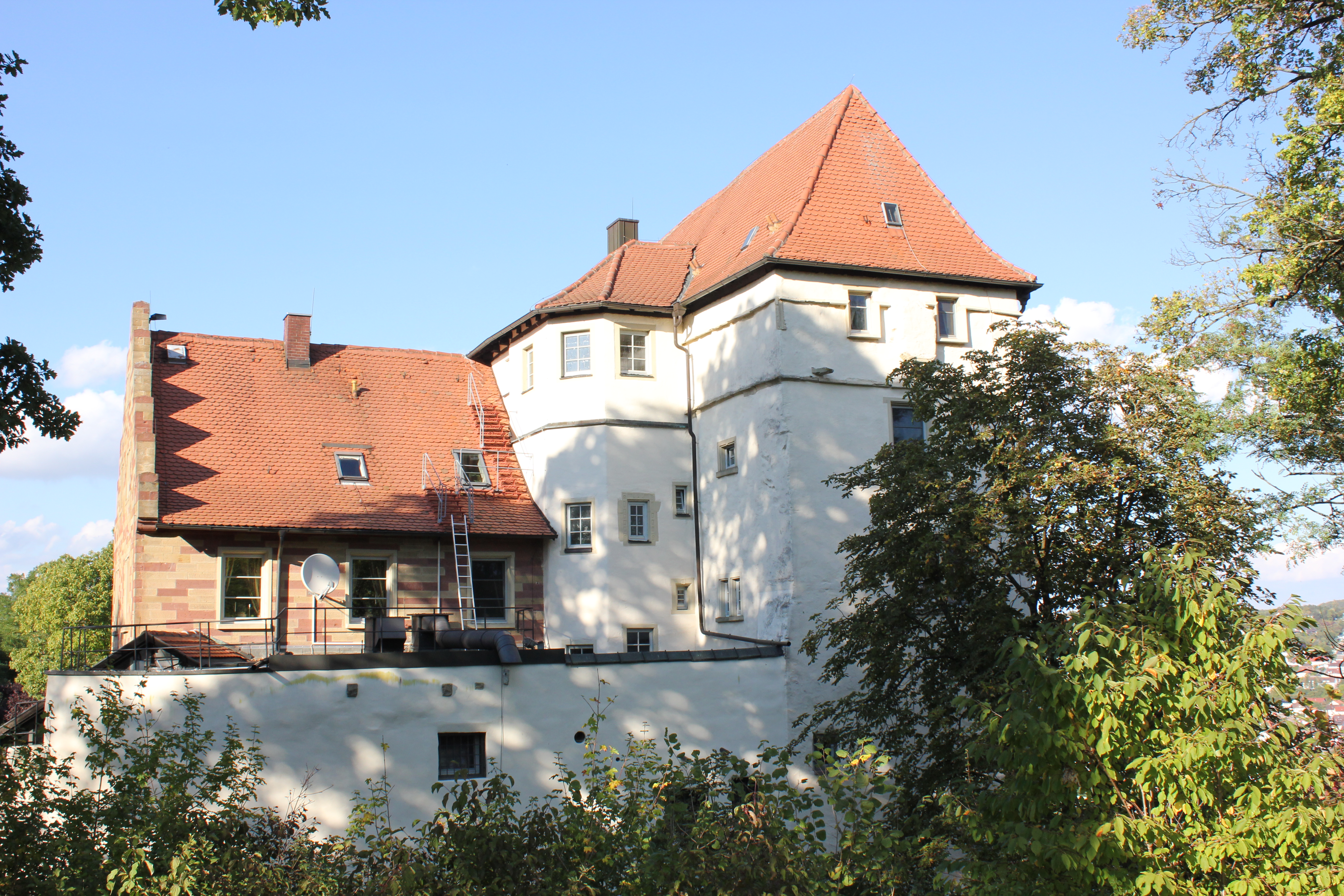
Neuburg Castle, Obrigheim

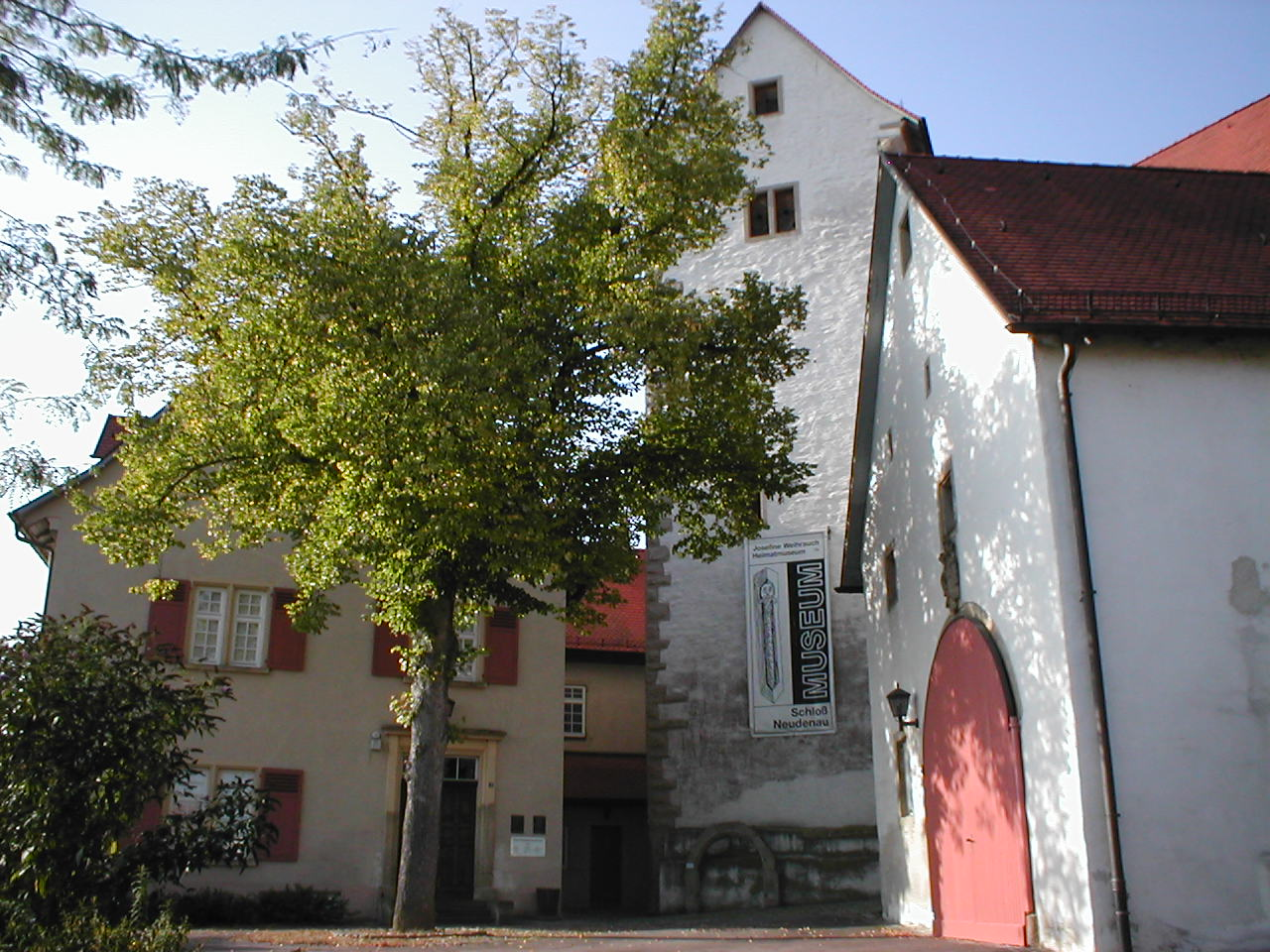
Neudenau Castle

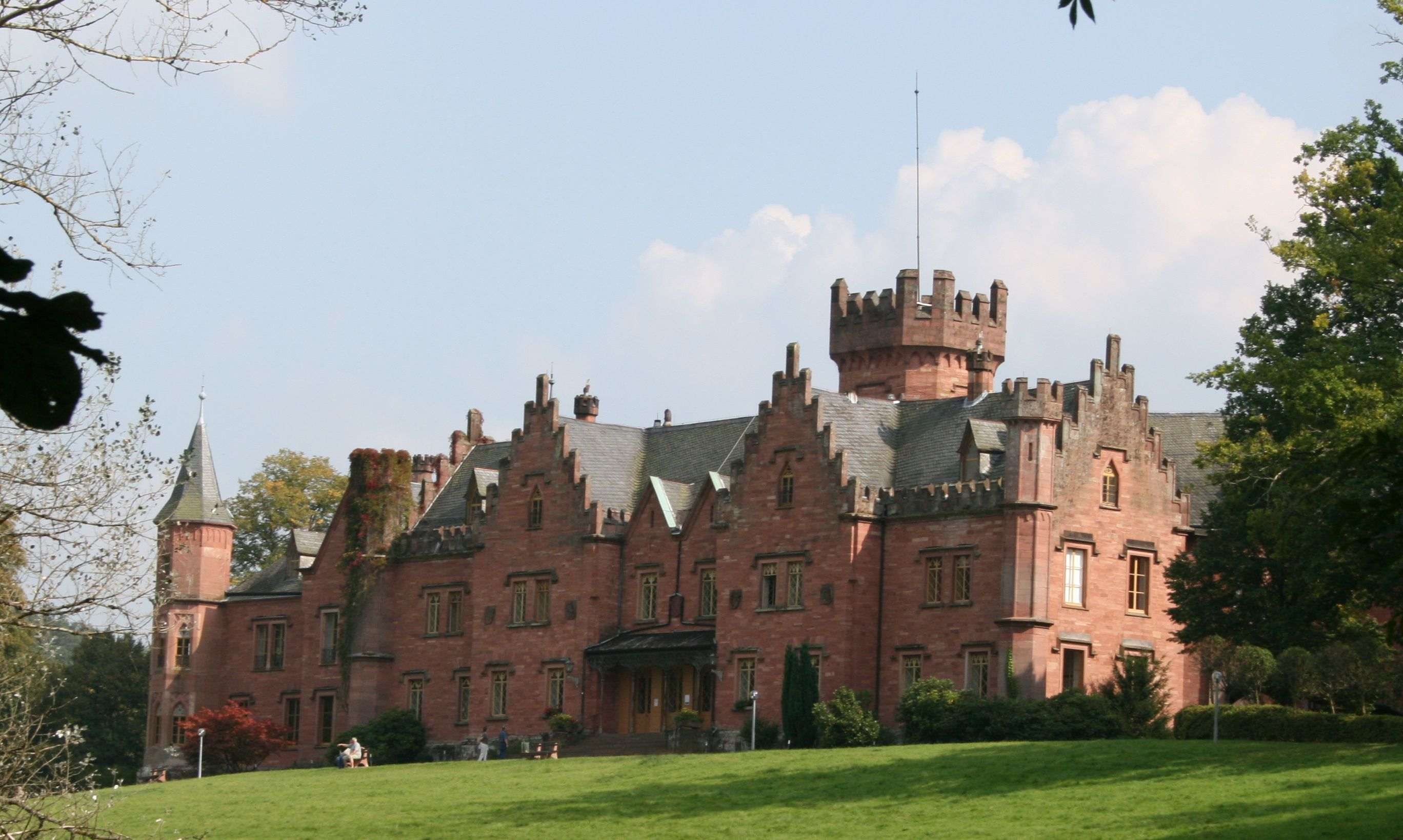
Waldleiningen Castle

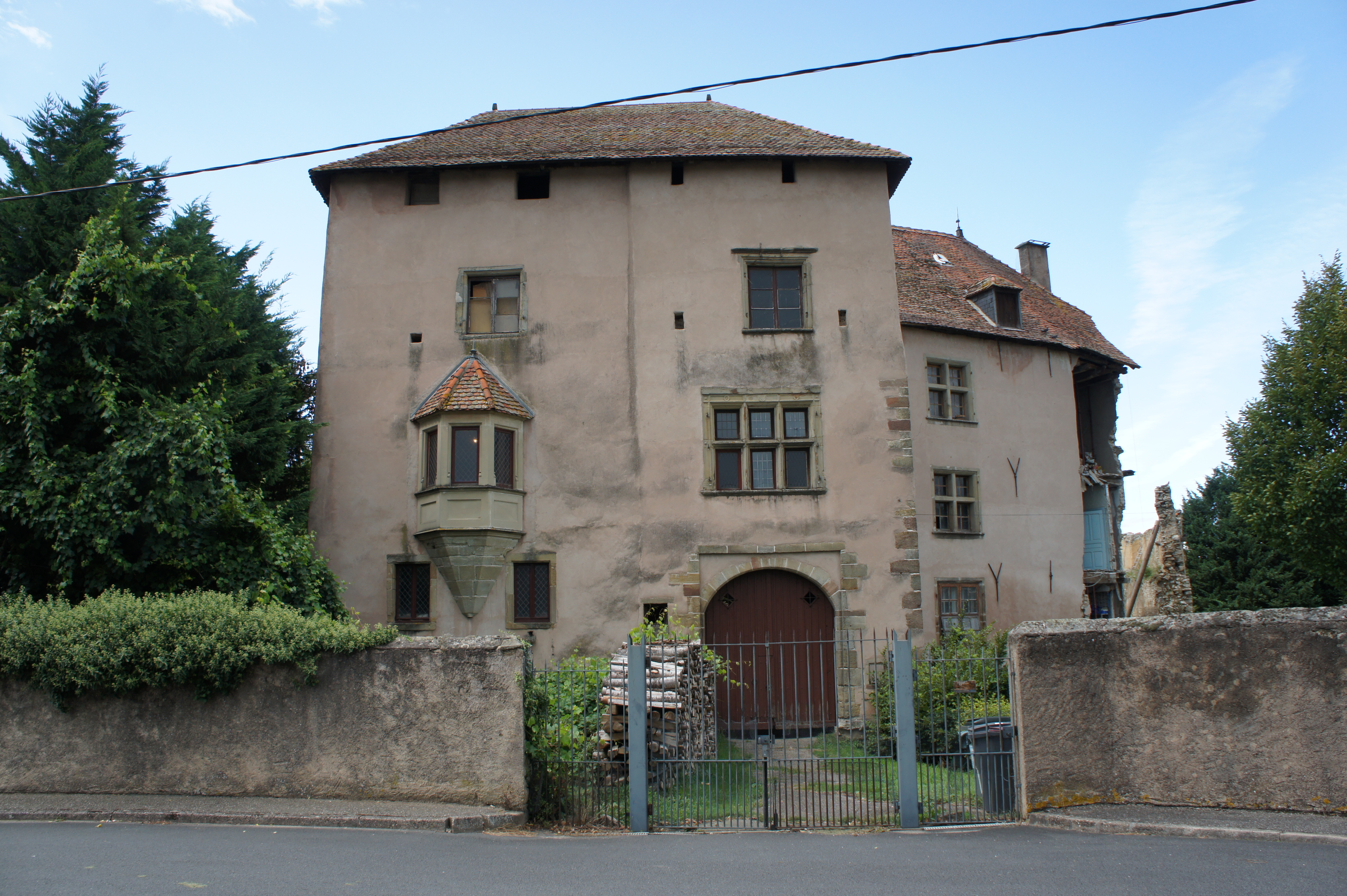
Rixingen Castle

== See also ==
- County of Leiningen
- Prince of Leiningen
- Princess of Leiningen
