= Margarete von Leiningen-Westerburg-Neuleiningen =

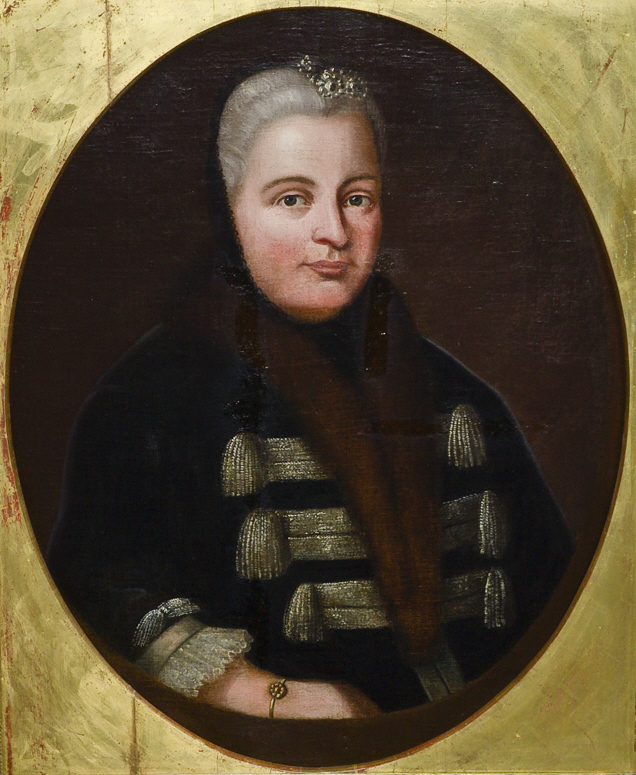
Margarethe Christiane Auguste

Margarete von Leiningen-Westerburg-Neuleiningen (1694-1771), was a countess regnant of Leiningen from 1726-1740.
