= Hardenburg (Bad Dürkheim) =

Hardenburg Höhenburg
- Bad Dürkheim-Hardenburg
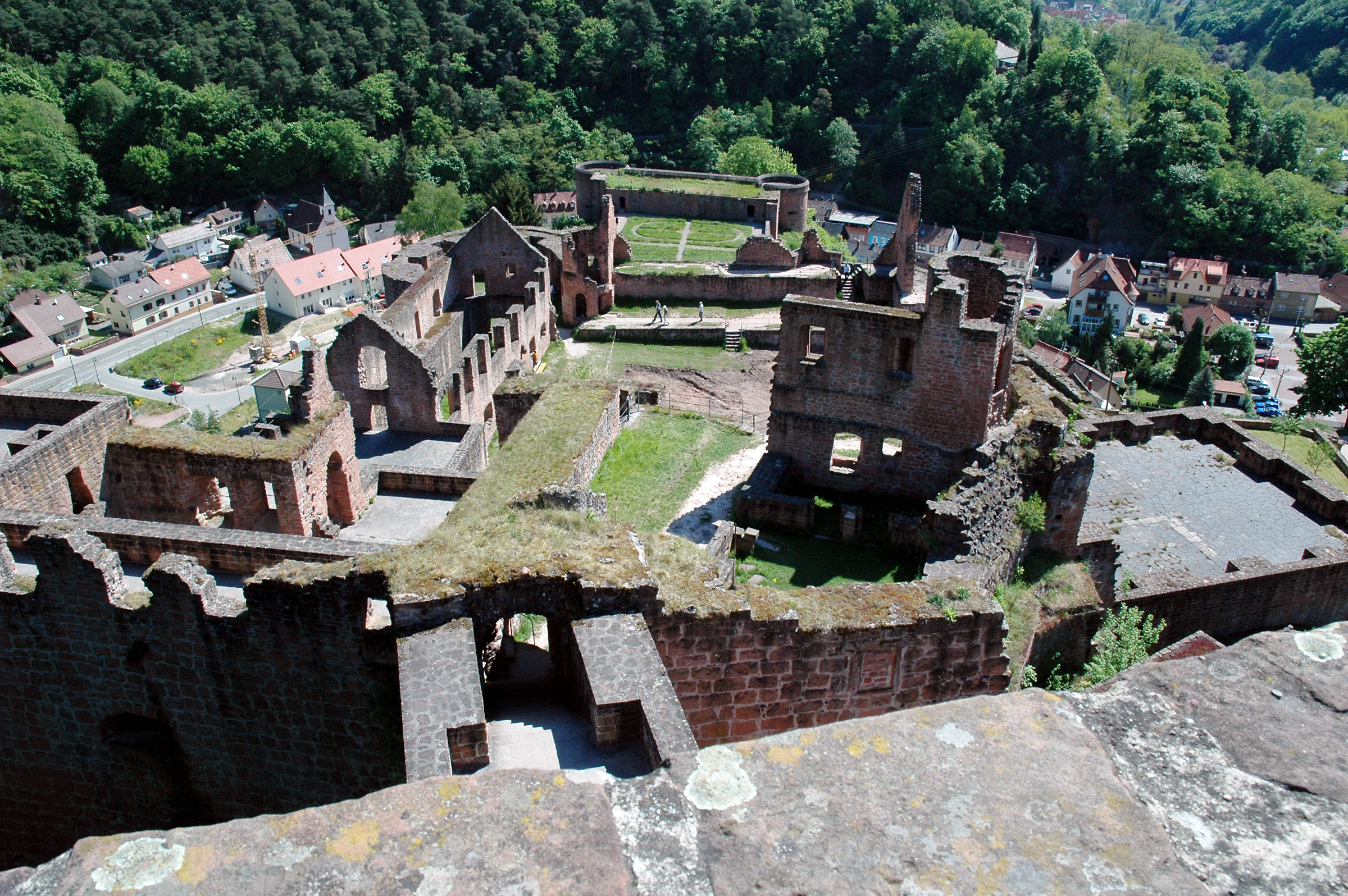
- Hardenburg

Site information
- Type: hill castle
- Code: DE-RP
- Condition: Ruin, partially reconstructed

Location
- Coordinates: 49°27′44″N 8°07′18″E
- Area: 180 × 90 m (590 × 300 ft)

Site history
- Built: 1205/1214

Garrison information
- Occupants: Counts

The Hardenburg on the eastern edge of the Palatinate Forest near the Rhineland-Palatinate town of Bad Dürkheim is even as a ruin one of the mightiest castles of Palatinate. It was the residence of the Counts of Leiningen, who in 1725 moved to Schloss Dürkheim.

== Literature ==
- Alexander Thon, ed. (2005), Wie Schwalbennester an den Felsen geklebt : Burgen in der Nordpfalz (in German) (1. ed.), Regensburg: Verlag Schnell und Steiner, pp. 60–67, ISBN 3-7954-1674-4
- Jürgen Keddigkeit; Alexander Thon; Michael Losse (2003), Burgruine Hardenburg bei Bad Dürkheim : Burgen, Schlösser, Altertümer Rheinland-Pfalz (in German), vol. Heft 3, Regensburg: Verlag Schnell und Steiner, ISBN 3-7954-1516-0
- Jürgen Keddigkeit; Alexander Thon; Michael Losse (2002), "Hardenburg", in Jürgen Keddigkeit; Alexander Thon; Rolf Übel (eds.), Pfälzisches Burgenlexikon. Bd. 2. F−H (in German), vol. Bd. 12.2, Kaiserslautern, pp. 280–294, ISBN 3-927754-48-X, ISSN 0936-7640
