= Eva von Leiningen-Westerburg =

Eva von Leiningen-Westerburg (c. 1481-1543), was a suo jure ruling countess regnant of Leiningen-Westerburg from 1523 to 1543.

She was born to count Reinhard I av Leiningen (1453–1522) and Anna av Eppstein, countess of Königstein (d. 1483). After the death of her mother, her father remarried to Zymeria of Sayn (d. 1499). Eva never married.

After the death of her father, her elder half brother Kuno (1487–1547), was set to succeed her father as count of Leiningen. Eva von Leiningen-Westerburg contested this and demanded access to her dead mothers fortune or compensation for it. As Kuno was not able to pay her the sum of her inheritance, he divided the County of Leiningen and made a piece of it a new County, the County of Leiningen-Westerburg, and gave it to his half sister to reign for the duration of her lifetime, after which - her being unmarried - it should revert to the Count of Leiningen. Eva was thus granted the Castle of Neuleiningen as well as the lands of Grünstadt, Sausenheim, Asselheim, Albsheim an der Eis, Obrigheim, Kirchheim and Bissersheim as her own country and feif. She duly reigned over this territory for twenty years, beginning in 1523.
