= Princess of Leiningen =

This is a list of the ladies who have held the rank of princess consort as the wife of a Prince of Leiningen.

Picture	Name	Father	Birth	Marriage	Became Princess	Ceased to be Princess	Death	Spouse
	Christiane Wilhelmine Louise of Solms-Rödelheim and Assenheim	Wilhelm Carl Ludwig, Count of Solms-Rödelheim and Assenheim (Solms-Rödelheim-Assenheim)	24 April 1736	24 June 1749	3 July 1779 husband created Prince	6 January 1803		Carl Friedrich Wilhelm
	Henriette of Reuss-Ebersdorf	Heinrich XXIV, Count of Reuss-Ebersdorf (Reuss-Ebersdorf)	9 May 1767	4 July 1787	9 January 1807 husband's accession	3 September 1801		Emich Carl
	Victoria of Saxe-Coburg-Saalfeld	Francis, Duke of Saxe-Coburg-Saalfeld (Saxe-Coburg-Saalfeld)	17 August 1786	21 December 1803		4 July 1814 husband's death	16 March 1861	Emich Carl
	Maria von Klebelsberg-Thumburg	Count Maximilian von Klebelsberg-Thumburg (Klebelsberg)	27 March 1806	13 February 1829		13 November 1856 husband's death	28 October 1880	Carl Friedrich
	Princess Marie of Baden	Leopold, Grand Duke of Baden (Baden)	20 November 1834	11 September 1858		21 November 1899		Ernst Leopold
	Feodore of Hohenlohe-Langenburg	Hermann Ernst Franz Bernhard VI, Prince of Hohenlohe-Langenburg (Hohenlohe-Langenburg)	23 July 1866	12 July 1894	5 April 1904 husband's accession	1 November 1932		Emich Eduard
	Maria Kirillovna of Russia	Cyril Vladimirovich, Grand Duke of Russia (Holstein-Gottorp-Romanov)	2 February 1907	24 February 1925		2 August 1946 husband's death	25 October 1951	Friedrich Carl
	Eilika of Oldenburg	Nikolaus, Hereditary Grand Duke of Oldenburg (Holstein-Gottorp)	2 February 1928	10 August 1950		30 October 1991 husband's death	26 January 2016	Emich Kirill
	Alexandra of Hanover	Ernest Augustus IV, Prince of Hanover (Hanover)	18 February 1959	11 October 1981		INCUMBENT	living	Andreas
