= Karl, Prince of Leiningen (1898–1946) =

Karl
- Prince of Leiningen

6th Prince of Leiningen
- Tenure: 18 July 1939 – 2 August 1946
- Predecessor: Prince Emich
- Successor: Prince Emich Kirill
- Born: 13 February 1898; Straßburg, German Empire
- Died: 2 August 1946 (aged 48); Saransk, Soviet Union
- Spouse: Grand Duchess Maria Kirillovna of Russia (m. 1925)
- Issue Detail: Emich Kyrill, Prince of Leiningen; Prince Karl; Princess Kira; Princess Margarita, Princess of Hohenzollern; Princess Mechtilde; Prince Friedrich Wilhelm; Prince Peter
Names
- Friedrich Karl Eduard Erwin Fürst zu Leiningen
- House: Leiningen
- Father: Emich, Prince of Leiningen
- Mother: Princess Feodore of Hohenlohe-Langenburg
- Military career
- Allegiance: Nazi Germany
- Service: Kriegsmarine
- Service years: 1939–1945
- Rank: Captain
- Conflicts: World War II

Karl, Prince of Leiningen (German: Friedrich Karl Eduard Erwin Fürst zu Leiningen; 13 February 1898 – 2 August 1946) was a German military officer and the eldest surviving son of Emich, Prince of Leiningen. Upon his father's death in 1939, he became the sixth Prince of Leiningen.

== Early life ==
He was born in Straßburg, German Empire (which later became part of France), as the third child and second son of Emich, Prince of Leiningen (1866–1939; son of Ernst, Prince of Leiningen and Princess Marie of Baden) and his wife, Princess Feodore of Hohenlohe-Langenburg (1866–1932; daughter of Hermann, Prince of Hohenlohe-Langenburg and Princess Leopoldine of Baden). Through his father, he was a descendant of Gustav IV Adolf of Sweden.

== Marriage ==
He married on 25 November 1925 in Langenburg to Grand Duchess Maria Kirillovna of Russia (1907–1951), eldest child of Grand Duke Kirill Vladimirovich of Russia and his wife, Princess Victoria Melita of Saxe-Coburg and Gotha (his third cousin through descent from Princess Victoria of Saxe-Coburg-Saalfeld). Karl is descended from the son of Victoria's first marriage and Maria's descent is from the daughter of Victoria's second marriage.

They had seven children:

- Emich Kyrill, Prince of Leiningen (18 October 1926 – 30 October 1991) married Duchess Eilika of Oldenburg (second of three daughter of Nicolas Frederick William, Hereditary Grand Duke of Oldenburg) on 10 August 1950. They had four children and six grandchildren:
  - Princess Melita Elisabeth Bathildis Helene Margarita of Leiningen (b. 19 June 1951) married Horst Legrum on 14 April 1978.
  - Prince Karl Emich of Leiningen (b. 12 June 1952) married Princess Margarita of Hohenlohe-Öhringen on 8 June 1984. They have one daughter. He remarried Gabriele Thyssen on 24 May 1991 and they were divorced in 1998. They have one daughter. He remarried, again, Countess Isabelle von und zu Egloffstein on 7 June 2008. They have one son.
    - Princess Cécilia of Leiningen (born in 1988)
    - Princess Theresa of Leiningen (born in 1992)
    - Prince Emich Albrecht Karl of Leiningen (born in 2010)
  - Andreas, Prince of Leiningen (b. 27 November 1955), married Princess Alexandra of Hanover (daughter of Prince Ernest Augustus of Hanover) on 5 October 1981. They have three children:
    - Hereditary Prince Ferdinand Heinrich Emich Christian Carl (8 August 1982). He married Princess Victoria Luise of Prussia and had two daughters:
      - Princess Alexandra Viktoria Luise Ehrengard of Leiningen (29 February 2020)
      - Princess Feodora (16 August 2021)
    - Princess Olga Margarita Valerie Elisabeth Stephanie Alexandra of Leiningen (23 October 1984)
    - Prince Hermann Ernst Johann Albrecht Paul of Leiningen (13 September 1987). He married Isabelle Heubach, they had one son:
      - Prince Leopold Konstantin Rainer Andreas of Leiningen (2019)
  - Princess Stephanie Margarita of Leiningen (1 October 1958 – 23 September 2017)
- Prince Karl of Leiningen (2 January 1928 – 28 September 1990) married Princess Marie Louise of Bulgaria on 14 February 1957 and they were divorced on 4 December 1968. They had two sons and five grandchildren:
  - Prince Boris zu Leiningen (b. 17 April 1960), who married Millena Manov on 14 February 1987 and they were divorced in 1996. They have one son. Boris remarried Cheryl Riegler on 11 September 1998. They had two children:
    - Prince Nicholas of Leiningen (b. 25 October 1991).
    - Prince Karl Heinrich of Leiningen (b. 17 February 2001).
    - Princess Juliana Elizabeth Maria of Leiningen (b. 19 September 2003).
  - Prince Hermann zu Leiningen (b. 16 April 1963), who married Deborah Cully on 16 May 1987. They have three daughters:
    - Princess Tatiana Victoria Maureen of Leiningen (born August 27, 1989). She married Clayton Reynolds on June 17, 2017, and they have children:
      - August Rhodes Robert Reynolds Leiningen (born June 14, 2021).
      - Celeste Ines Myrna Reynolds Leiningen (born August 13, 2023).
    - Princess Nadia Christiane Ruth of Leiningen (born December 16, 1991). She married Ian Baker on July 18, 2020, and they have children:
      - Thomas James Baker Leiningen (born December 20, 2021).
      - Theodore Charles Baker Leiningen (born September 17, 2024).
      - Georgia Blaire Baker Leiningen (born June 19, 2026).
    - Princess Alexandra Sophia Maria of Leiningen (born December 18, 1997), known as "Alexa".
- Princess Kira of Leiningen (18 July 1930 – 24 September 2005) married Prince Andrew of Yugoslavia on 18 September 1963 and they were divorced on 10 July 1972. They had three children and four grandchildren:
  - Princess Lavinia Marie of Yugoslavia (18 October 1961), Married firstly 20 May 1989 Erastos Dimitrios Sidiropoulos (divorced 14 June 1993) and secondly on 4 October 1998 Austin Prichard-Levy (1953–2017). They had three children:
    - Nadya Marie George (11 December 1987), illegitimate; fathered by Roy Rexford Finnimore, her surname was changed to Sidiropoulos in 1990.
    - Andrej Aristotle Sidiropoulos (22 February 1990).
    - Luca Orlando Christopher Prichard-Levy (14 February 2000).
  - Prince Karl Vladimir Cyril Andrej of Yugoslavia (11 March 1964), married 18 April 2000 Brigitte Müller.
  - Prince Dimitri Ivan Mihailo of Yugoslavia (21 April 1965).
- Princess Margarita of Leiningen (9 May 1932 – 16 June 1996) married Frederick William, Prince of Hohenzollern on 5 January 1951. They had three sons and nine grandchildren:
  - Karl Friedrich, Prince of Hohenzollern (born 1952), married Katharina Maria "Nina" de Zomer and had four children:
    - Prince Alexander, Hereditary Prince of Hohenzollern (born 1987).
    - Princess Philippa Marie Carolina Isabelle (born 1988).
    - Princess Flaminia Pia Eilika Stephanie (born 1992).
    - Princess Antonia Elisabeth Georgina Tatiana (born 1995).
  - Prince Albrecht Johannes Hermann Meinrad Hubertus Michael Stephan of Hohenzollern (born 3 August 1954), married Nathalie Rocabado de Viets and had two daughters:
    - Princess Josephine Marie Isabelle Sophia Margarete (born October 31, 2002, in Munich)
    - Princess Eugenia Bernadette Maria Theresia Esperanza (born June 8, 2005).
  - Prince Ferdinand Maria Fidelis Leopold Meinrad Valentin of Hohenzollern (born 14 February 1960), married Countess Ilona Kálnoky de Köröspatak and had three children:
    - Prince Aloys Maria Friedrich Karl (born April 6, 1999)
    - Prince Fidelis Maria Anton Alexis Hans (born April 25, 2001)
    - Princess Victoria Margarita Sieglinde Johanna Isabella Maria (born January 28, 2004).
- Princess Mechtilde of Leiningen (2 January 1936 – 12 February 2021) married Karl Bauscher on 25 November 1961. They had three sons and three grandchildren:
  - Ulf-Karl Bauscher (b. 20 February 1963)
  - Berthold Alexander Eric Bauscher (b. 31 October 1965)
  - Johann Karl Joachim Fritz Markwart Bauscher (b. 2 February 1971)
- Prince Friedrich Wilhelm Berthold of Leiningen (18 June 1938 – 29 August 1998) married Karin Göss on 9 July 1960 and they were divorced in 1962. He remarried Helga Eschenbacher on 23 August 1971.
- Prince Peter Viktor of Leiningen (23 December 1942 – 12 January 1943)

== Prince of Leiningen ==
In 1937, he joined the Nazi Party (membership number 4.852.615), and on the death of his father in 1939, he succeeded as the sixth Prince of Leiningen. He was a prisoner of war in the Soviet Union, where he died in 1946 at Saransk.

== Ancestry ==
Ancestors of Karl, Prince of Leiningen (1898–1946)

8. Carl, Prince of Leiningen
4. Ernst, Prince of Leiningen
9. Countess Marie von Klebelsberg
2. Emich, Prince of Leiningen
10. Leopold, Grand Duke of Baden
5. Princess Marie of Baden
11. Princess Sophie of Sweden
1. Karl, Prince of Leiningen
12. Ernst I, Prince of Hohenlohe-Langenburg
6. Hermann, Prince of Hohenlohe-Langenburg
13. Princess Feodora of Leiningen
3. Princess Feodore of Hohenlohe-Langenburg
14. Prince William of Baden
7. Princess Leopoldine of Baden
15. Duchess Elisabeth Alexandrine of Württemberg

== Notes and sources ==
- Queen Victoria's Descendants, New York, 1987., Eilers, Marlene A., Reference: 195

Karl, Prince of Leiningen (1898–1946) House of Leiningen Born: 13 February 1898 Died: 2 August 1946
Titles in pretence
| Preceded by Emich | — TITULAR — Prince of Leiningen; 1939–1946; Reason for succession failure: German nobility titles abolished | Succeeded by Emich Kyrill |
