= Emich Kyrill, Prince of Leiningen =

Emich Kyrill
- Prince of Leiningen
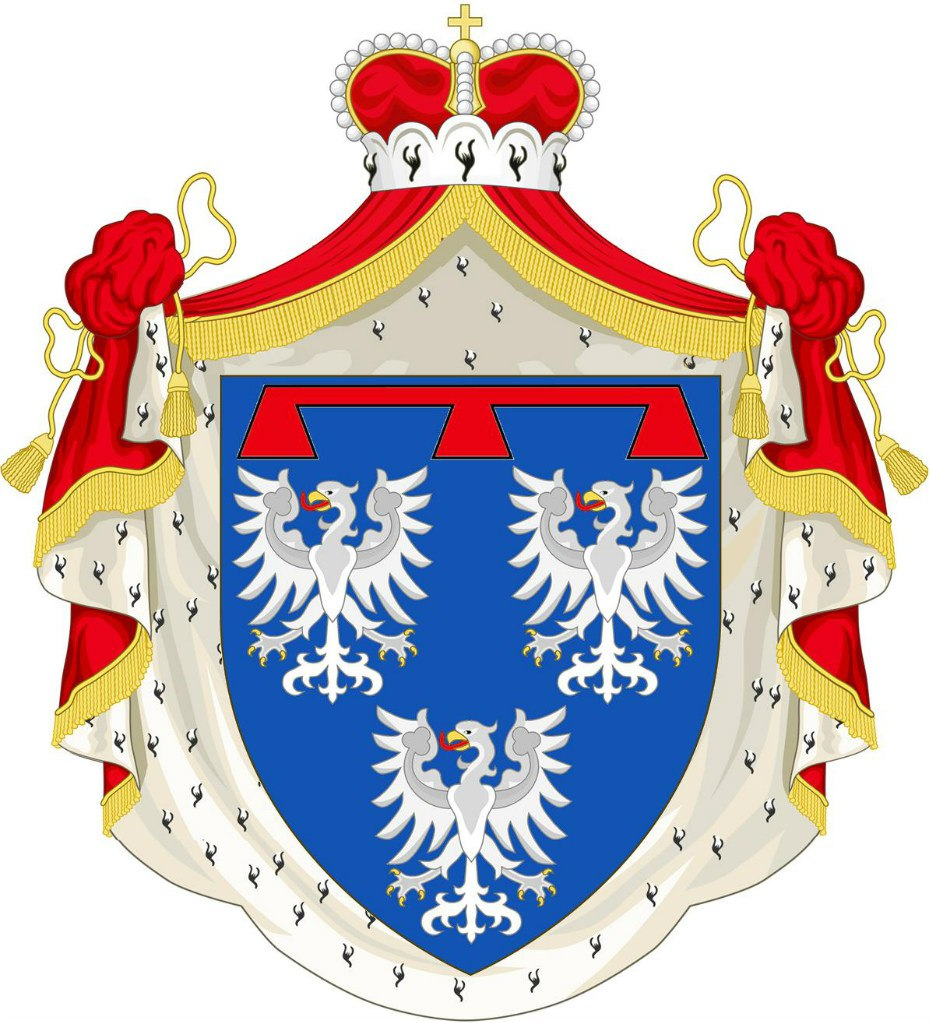

7th Prince of Leiningen
- Tenure: 2 August 1946 – 30 October 1991
- Predecessor: Karl, Prince of Leiningen
- Successor: Andreas, Prince of Leiningen
- Born: 18 October 1926; Coburg, Weimar Republic
- Died: 30 October 1991 (aged 65); Amorbach, Germany
- Spouse: Duchess Eilika of Oldenburg (m. 1950)
- Issue: Princess Melita; Prince Karl Emich; Andreas, Prince of Leiningen; Princess Stephanie
Names
- Emich Kirill Ferdinand Hermann Fürst zu Leiningen
- House: Leiningen
- Father: Karl, Prince of Leiningen
- Mother: Maria Kirillovna of Russia

Emich Kyrill, Prince of Leiningen (German: Emich Kirill Ferdinand Hermann Fürst zu Leiningen; 18 October 1926 – 30 October 1991) was a German entrepreneur and son of Karl, Prince of Leiningen. He was the 7th Prince of Leiningen from 1946 until his death in 1991.

== Early life ==
Emich was born at Coburg, Weimar Republic, the first child of Karl, Prince of Leiningen (1898–1946), (son of Emich, 5th Prince of Leiningen and Princess Feodore of Hohenlohe-Langenburg) and his wife, Grand Duchess Maria Kirillovna of Russia (1907–1951), (daughter of Grand Duke Kirill Vladimirovich of Russia and Princess Victoria Melita of Edinburgh). Through his mother, he was a descendant of Queen Victoria and Tsar Alexander II. Through his father, he was a descendant of the Vasa kings of Sweden and of both of Queen Victoria's half-siblings, Carl, Prince of Leiningen and Feodora, Princess of Hohenlohe-Langenburg. As a result, Emich was the first descendant of all three of Princess Victoria of Saxe-Coburg-Saalfeld's children.

== Marriage ==
Emich married on 10 August 1950 in Rastede to Duchess Eilika of Oldenburg (2 February 1928 – 26 January 2016), fourth child and second daughter of Nikolaus, Hereditary Grand Duke of Oldenburg and Princess Helena of Waldeck and Pyrmont.

They had four children:

- Princess Melita Elisabeth Bathildis Helene Margarita of Leiningen (b. 19 June 1951) married Horst Legrum on 14 April 1978.
- Prince Karl Emich of Leiningen (b. 12 June 1952) married Princess Margarita of Hohenlohe-Öhringen on 8 June 1984. They have one daughter. He remarried Gabriele Thyssen on 24 May 1991 and they were divorced in 1998. They have one daughter. He remarried, again, Countess Isabelle von und zu Egloffstein on 7 June 2008. They have one son.
  - Princess Cécilia of Leiningen (born in 1988)
  - Princess Theresa of Leiningen (born in 1992)
  - Prince Emich Albrecht Karl of Leiningen (born in 2010)
- Andreas, Prince of Leiningen (b. 27 November 1955), married Princess Alexandra of Hanover (daughter of Prince Ernest Augustus of Hanover) on 5 October 1981. They have three children:
  - Hereditary Prince Ferdinand Heinrich Emich Christian Carl (8 August 1982). He married Princess Victoria Luise of Prussia and had two daughters:
    - Princess Alexandra Viktoria Luise Ehrengard of Leiningen (29 February 2020)
    - Princess Feodora (16 August 2021)
  - Princess Olga Margarita Valerie Elisabeth Stephanie Alexandra of Leiningen (23 October 1984)
  - Prince Hermann Ernst Johann Albrecht Paul of Leiningen (13 September 1987). He married Isabelle Heubach, they had one son:
    - Prince Leopold Konstantin Rainer Andreas of Leiningen (2019)
- Princess Stephanie Margarita of Leiningen (1 October 1958 – 23 September 2017)

== Prince of Leiningen ==
On the death of his father in 1946, Emich became the titular Prince of Leiningen.

A businessman and entrepreneur, he owned a 1955 Mercedes-Benz 300SL Gullwing Coupe Chassis and a Münch Mammut motorcycle.

The Prince fell out with his eldest son over the latter's marriage, and disinherited him.

He died on 30 October 1991, and was succeeded by his son Andreas.

== Ancestry ==
Ancestors of Emich Kyrill, Prince of Leiningen

16. Carl, 3rd Prince of Leiningen
8. Ernst Leopold, 4th Prince of Leiningen
17. Countess Maria Klebelsberg
4. Emich, 5th Prince of Leiningen
18. Leopold, Grand Duke of Baden
9. Princess Marie of Baden
19. Princess Sophie of Sweden
2. Karl, 6th Prince of Leiningen
20. Ernst I, Prince of Hohenlohe-Langenburg
10. Hermann, Prince of Hohenlohe-Langenburg
21. Princess Feodora of Leiningen
5. Princess Feodore of Hohenlohe-Langenburg
22. Prince William of Baden
11. Princess Leopoldine of Baden
23. Duchess Elisabeth Alexandrine of Württemberg
1. Emich, 7th Prince of Leiningen
24. Alexander II of Russia
12. Grand Duke Vladimir Alexandrovich of Russia
25. Princess Marie of Hesse and by Rhine
6. Cyril Vladimirovich, Grand Duke of Russia
26. Frederick Francis II, Grand Duke of Mecklenburg-Schwerin
13. Duchess Marie of Mecklenburg-Schwerin
27. Princess Augusta Reuss of Köstritz
3. Grand Duchess Maria Kirillovna of Russia
28. Prince Albert of Saxe-Coburg and Gotha
14. Alfred, Duke of Saxe-Coburg and Gotha
29. Victoria of the United Kingdom
7. Princess Victoria Melita of Edinburgh
30. Alexander II of Russia (= 24)
15. Grand Duchess Maria Alexandrovna of Russia
31. Princess Marie of Hesse and by Rhine (= 25)

== Notes and sources ==
- Queen Victoria's Descendants, New York, 1987, Eilers, Marlene A., Reference: 195
- Genealogisches Handbuch des Adels, Fürstliche Häuser, Reference: 1997

Emich Kyrill, Prince of Leiningen House of Leiningen Born: 18 October 1926 Died: 30 October 1991
Titles in pretence
Preceded by Karl	— TITULAR — Prince of Leiningen; 1946–1991; Reason for succession failure: German nobility titles abolished	Succeeded by Andreas
