= Prince of Leiningen =

German noble title (1779–1919)

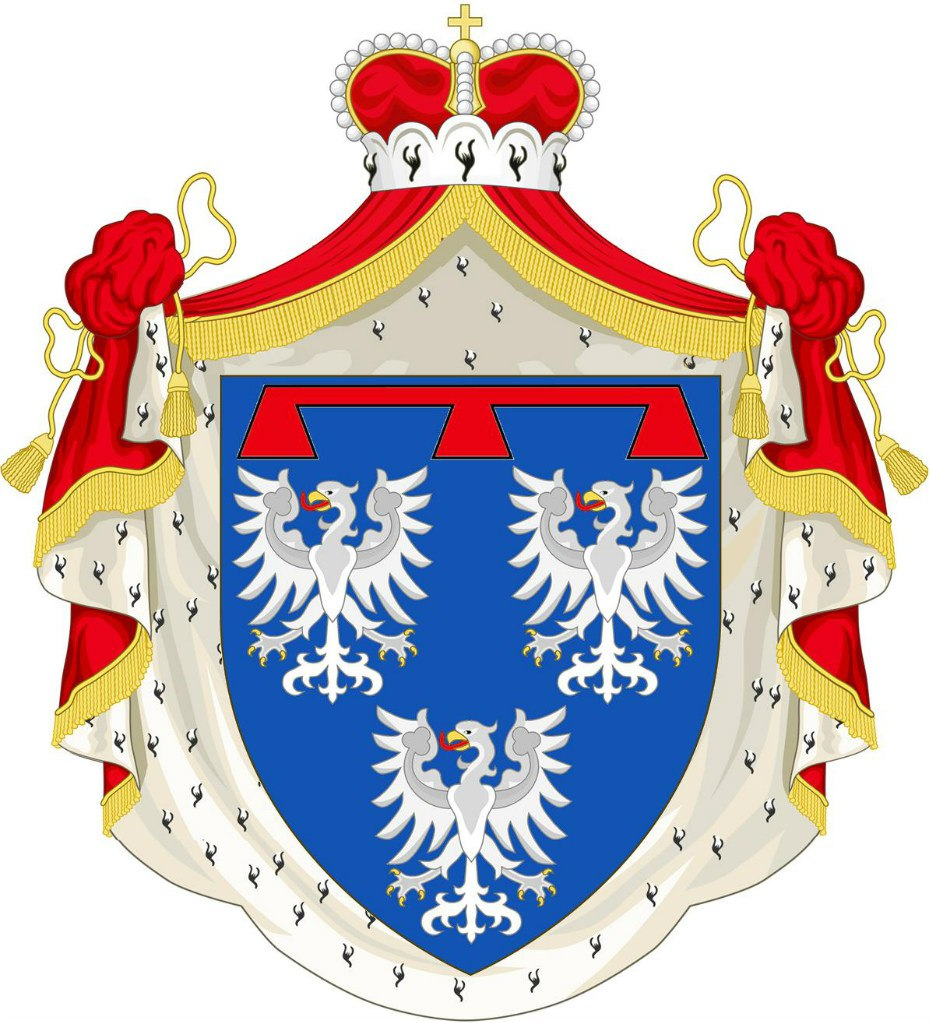
Arms of the Princes of Leiningen

The title of Prince of Leiningen (German: Fürst zu Leiningen) was created by the Holy Roman Emperor Joseph II, who elevated Carl Friedrich Wilhelm, Count of Leiningen-Dagsburg-Hardenburg (a younger branch of the House of Leiningen) to the rank of Reichsfürst (Prince of the Holy Roman Empire) on 3 July 1779. Together with all other titles of nobility in Germany, it was abolished with the 1919 Weimar Constitution.

== Principality of Leiningen at Amorbach ==
From 1560 until 1725, Hardenburg Castle was the main seat of the branch. After its partial destruction during the Nine Years' War, the residence was moved to Bad Dürkheim.

In 1801, this line was deprived by France of its lands on the left bank of the Rhine, namely Hardenburg, Dagsburg and Durkheim. However, it received the secularized Amorbach Abbey in 1803 as ample compensation for these losses. The complete titles of Carl Friedrich Wilhelm, 1st Prince of Leiningen, were Imperial Prince of Leiningen, Count palatine of Mosbach, Count of Düren, Lord of Miltenberg, Amorbach, Bischofsheim, Boxberg, Schüpf and Lauda.

A few years later, the short-lived Principality of Leiningen at Amorbach was mediatized. Its territory is now included mainly in Baden, but also partly in Bavaria and in Hesse. Amorbach Abbey is still today the seat of the Prince of Leiningen. A former hunting lodge named Waldleiningen Castle at Mudau is now run as a hospital by the family.

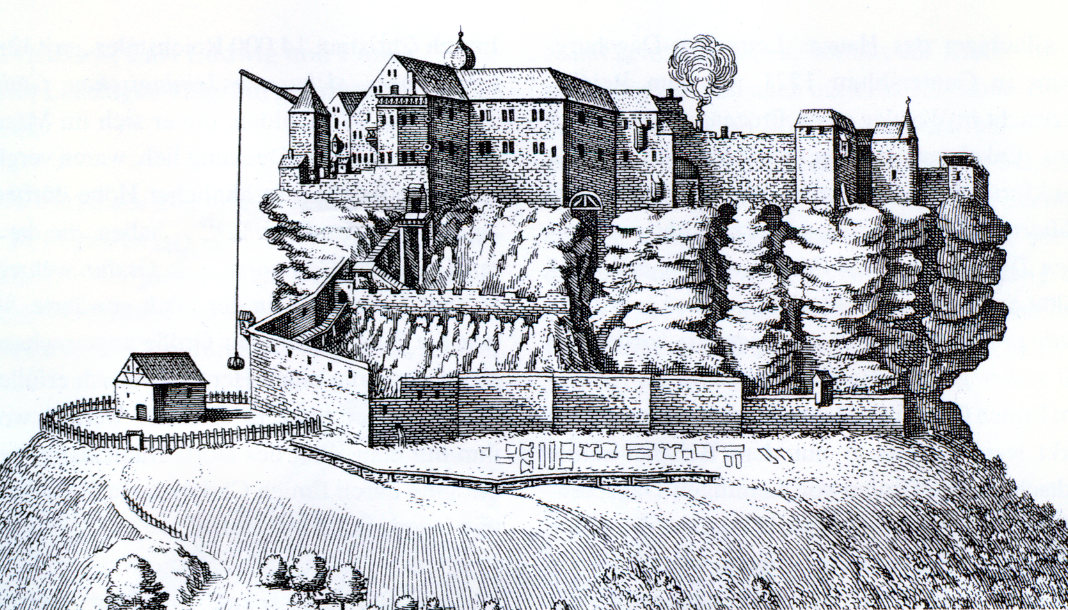
Dagsburg Castle (1663)

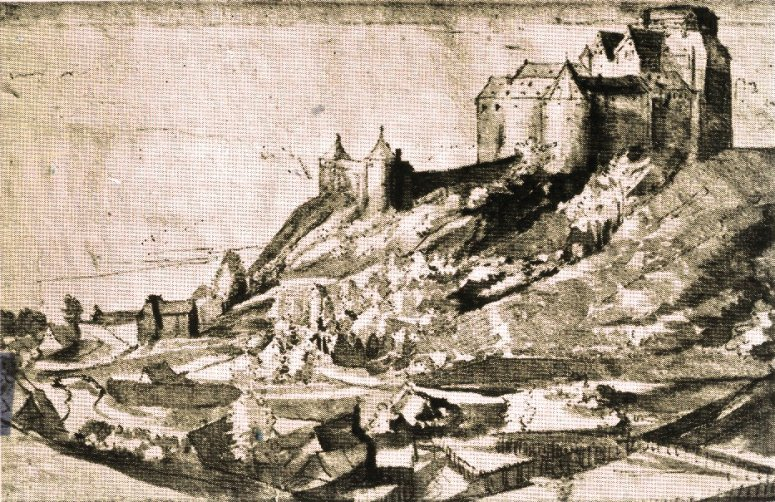
Hardenburg Castle (1580)

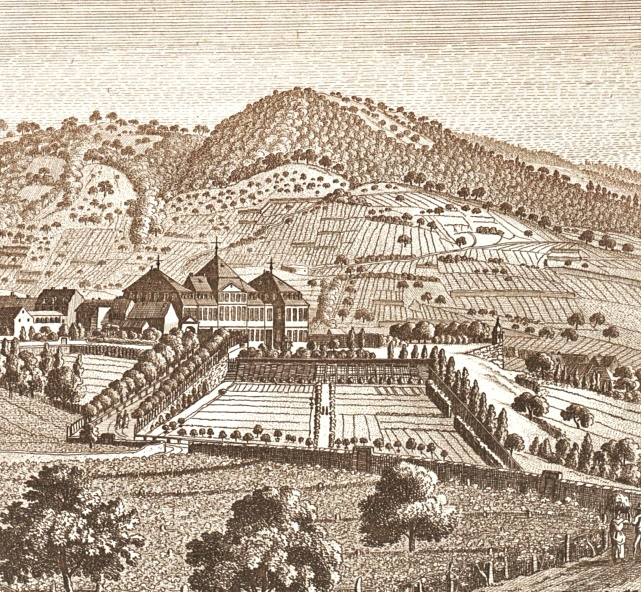
Durkheim Castle (1787)

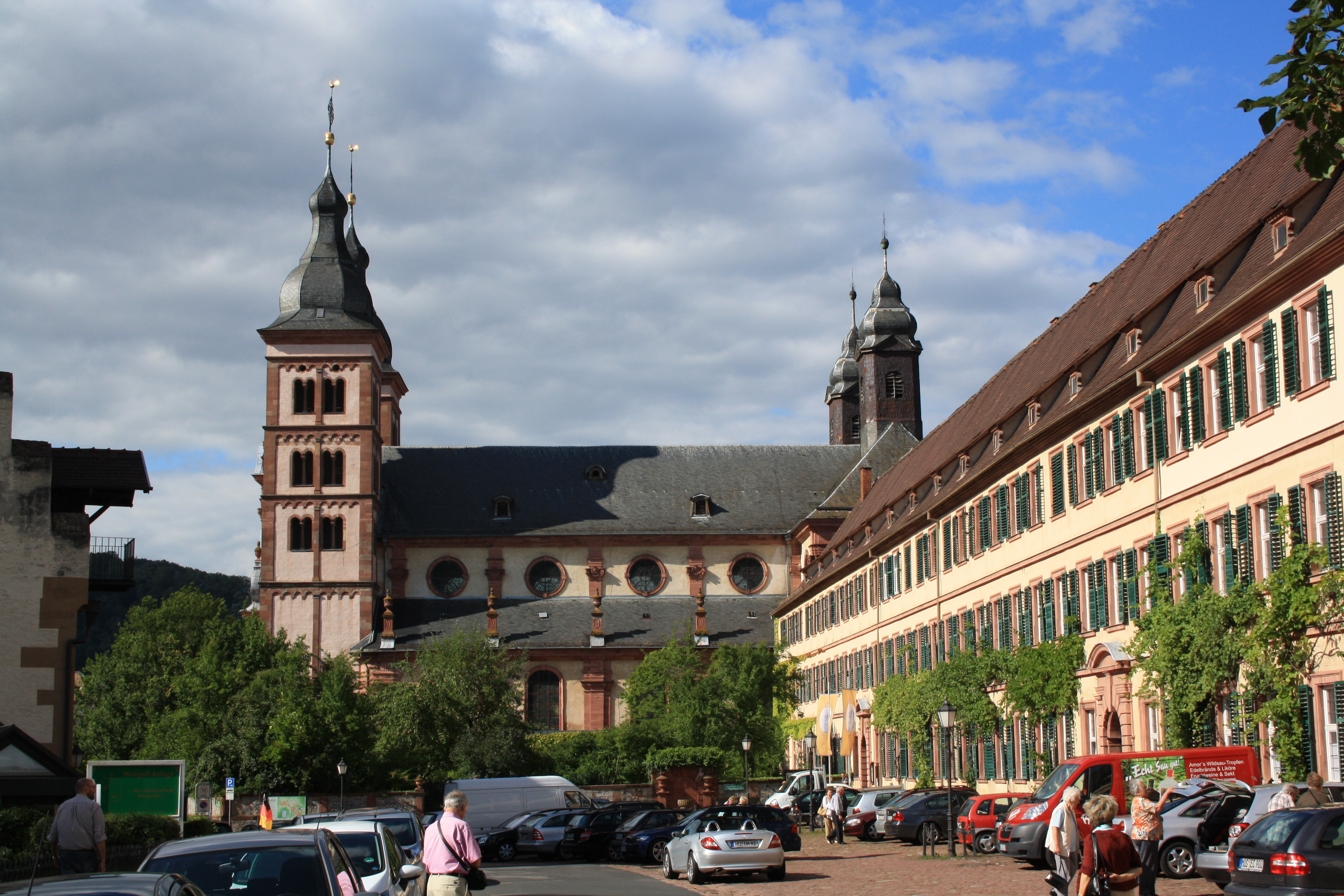
Amorbach Abbey

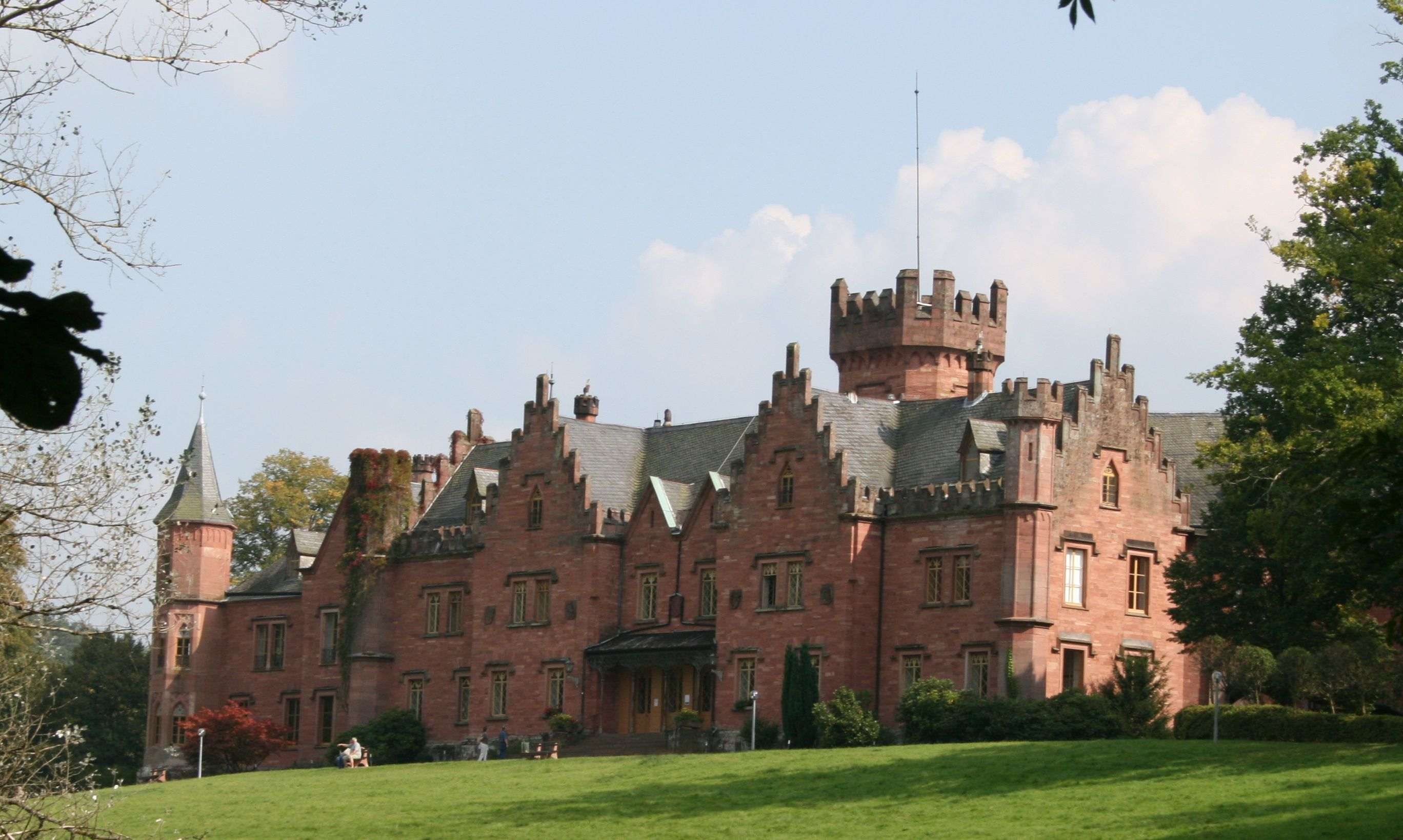
Waldleiningen Castle

== Family connections and events ==
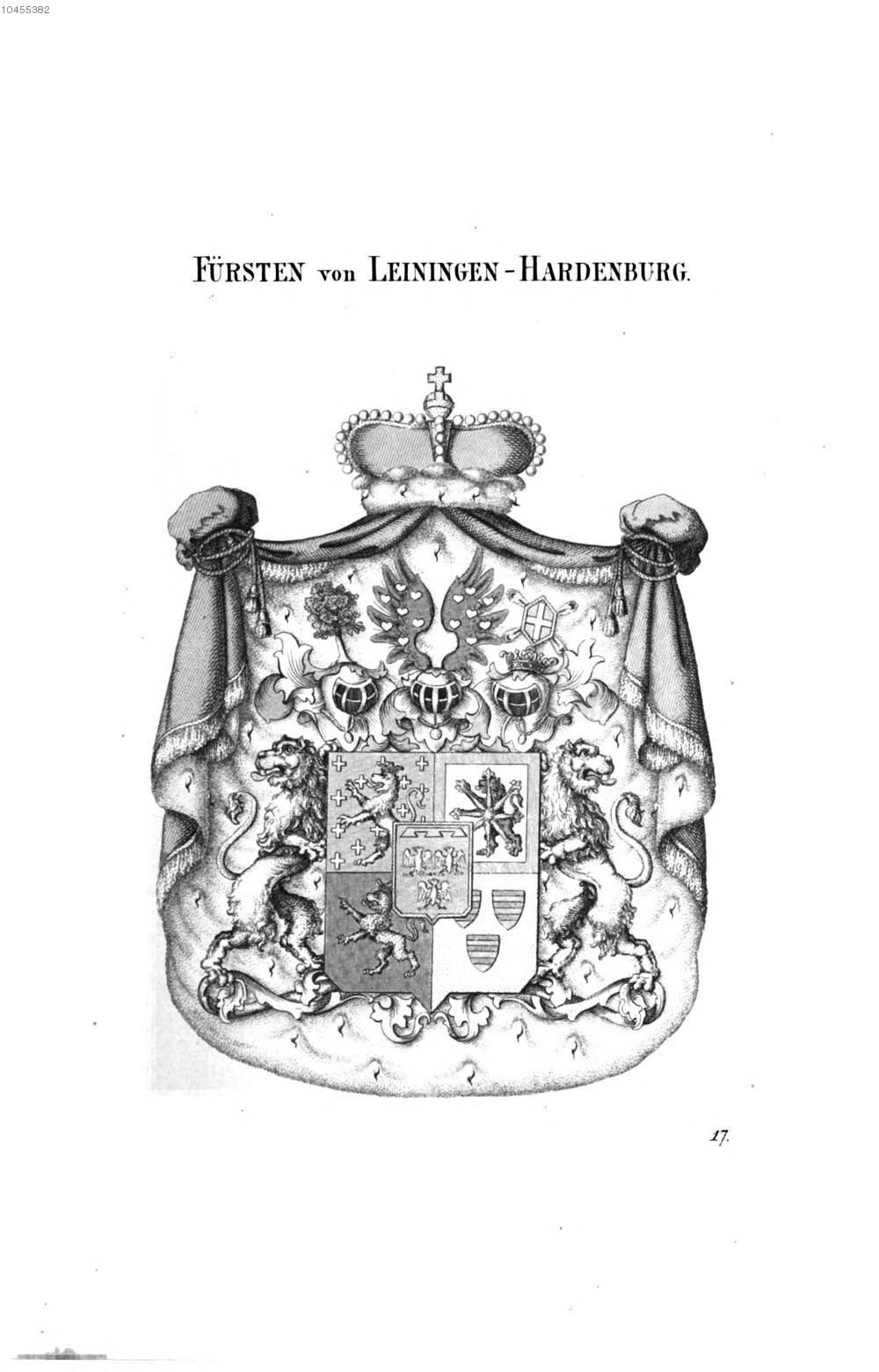
The princely arms in the mid 19th century

The second prince, Emich Charles, married Princess Victoria of Saxe-Coburg-Saalfeld. After his death in 1814, the princess married Prince Edward, Duke of Kent and Strathearn, a younger son of George III of the United Kingdom, by whom she became the mother of Queen Victoria. The Queen's half-siblings, Carl, 3rd Prince of Leiningen and Princess Feodora remained close to their half-sister.

The fourth prince, Ernst, pursued a career in the British Royal Navy and married Princess Marie of Baden.

The sixth prince, Karl, married Grand Duchess Maria Kirillovna of Russia, daughter of Princess Victoria Melita who was in turn daughter of Alfred, Duke of Saxe-Coburg and Gotha, Queen Victoria's second son.

In 1991, the seventh prince, Emich, disinherited his eldest son, the Hereditary Prince Karl Emich, after he married his second wife, Dr Gabriele Thyssen, on May 24 of that same year. The disinheritance was upheld by the German courts, and so on Emich's death later that year, he was succeeded by his second son, Andreas, who has been the eighth prince from that time. He married Princess Alexandra of Hanover.

== Princes of Leiningen (from 1779) ==
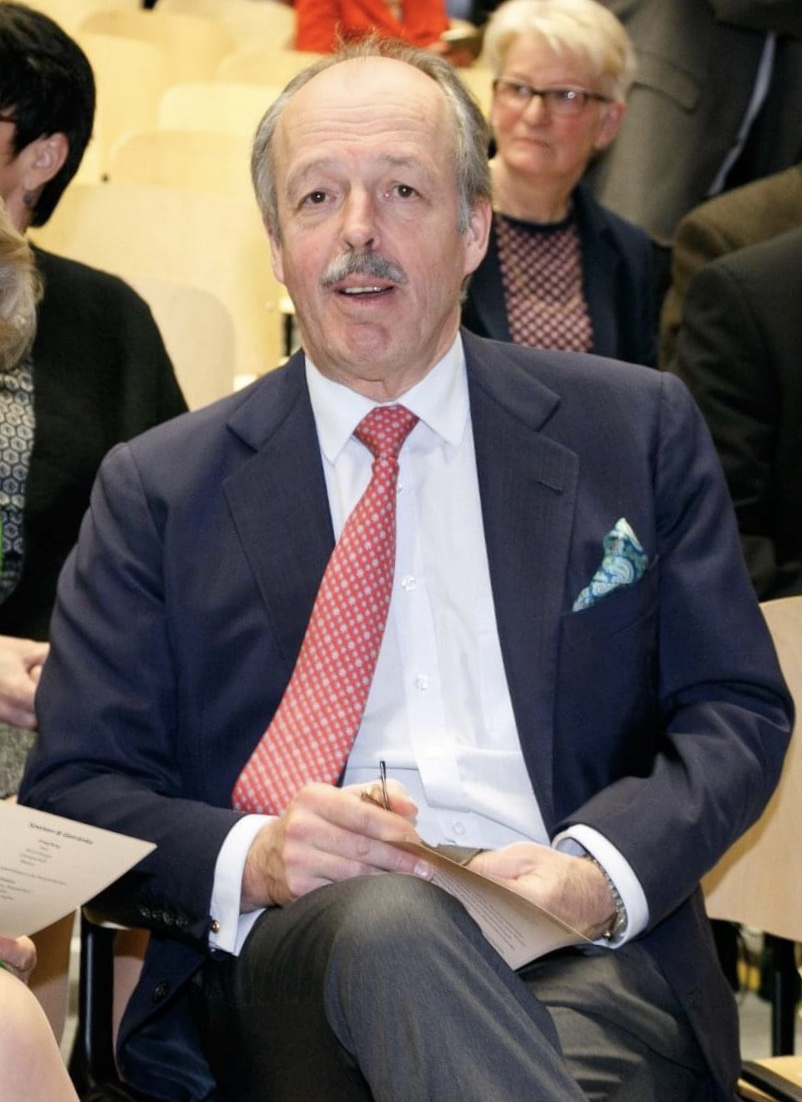
Andreas, 8th Prince of Leiningen

- Karl Friedrich Wilhelm, 1st Prince of Leiningen (1724–1807)
- Emich Karl, 2nd Prince of Leiningen (1763–1814)
- Karl, 3rd Prince of Leiningen (1804–1856)
- Ernst Leopold, 4th Prince of Leiningen (1830–1904)
- Emich, 5th Prince of Leiningen (1866–1939)
- Karl, 6th Prince of Leiningen (1898–1946)
- Emich, 7th Prince of Leiningen (1926–1991)
- Andreas, 8th Prince of Leiningen (born 1955)

The heir apparent is Ferdinand, Hereditary Prince of Leiningen (born 1982).

== See also ==
- House of Leiningen
- Princess of Leiningen

== Sources ==
- Marek, Miroslav. "leiningen/leiningen6.html". Genealogy.EU.
