= Emich, Prince of Leiningen =

Emich
- Prince of Leiningen
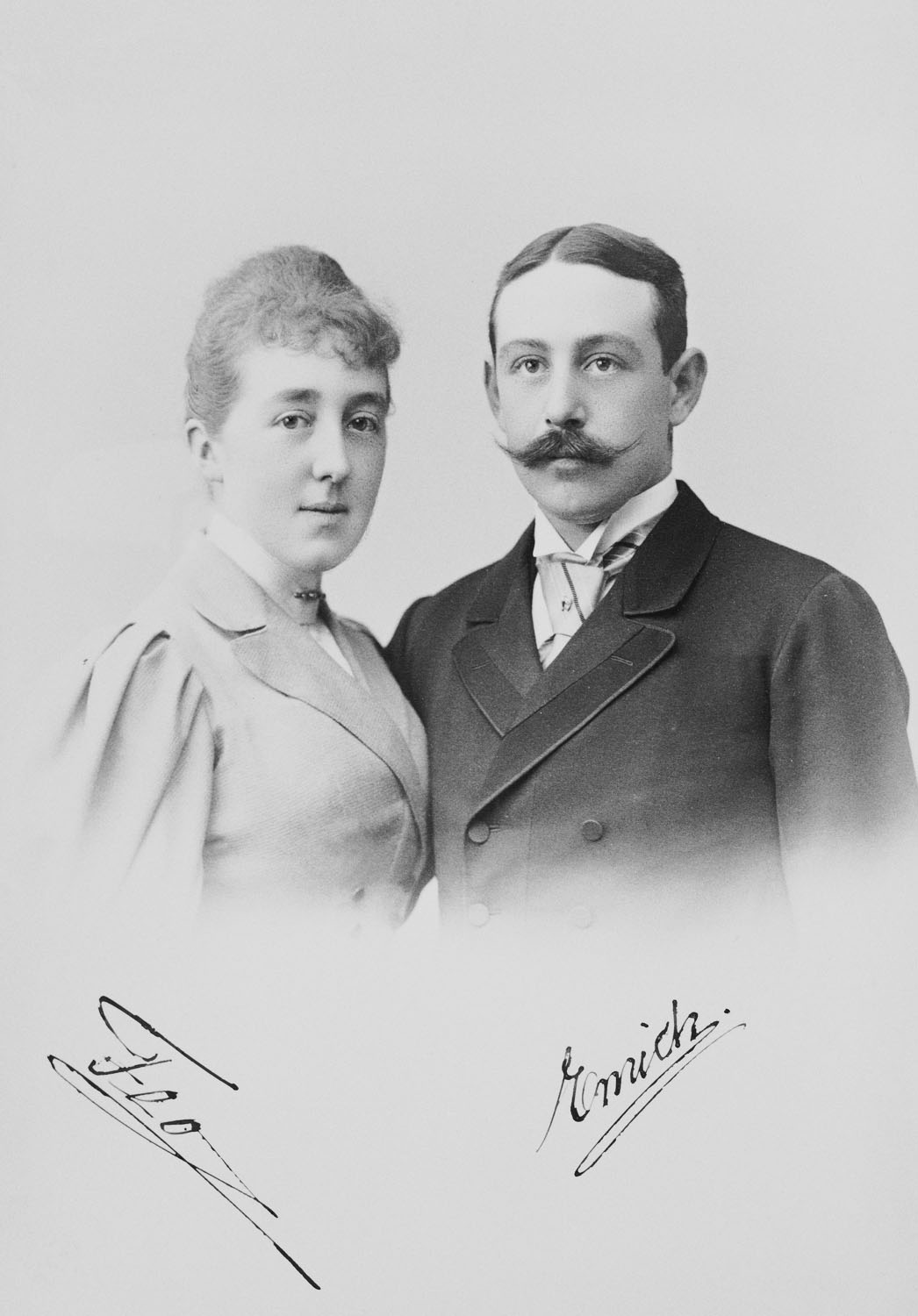
- Emich with his wife Feodore, c. 1894

5th Prince of Leiningen
- Tenure: 5 April 1904 – 18 July 1939
- Predecessor: Ernst, Prince of Leiningen
- Successor: Karl, Prince of Leiningen
- Born: 18 January 1866; Osborne House, Isle of Wight, England
- Died: 18 July 1939 (aged 73); Mudau, Free People's State of Württemberg, Nazi Germany
- Spouse: Princess Feodore of Hohenlohe-Langenburg (m. 1894; died 1932)
- Issue: Princess Viktoria, Countess of Solms-Rödelheim-Assenheim; Emich Ernst, Hereditary Prince of Leiningen; Karl, Prince of Leiningen; Prince Hermann; Prince Hesso
Names
- German: Emich Eduard Carl
- House: Leiningen
- Father: Ernst, Prince of Leiningen
- Mother: Princess Marie of Baden

Emich, Prince of Leiningen (German: Emich Eduard Carl Fürst zu Leiningen; 18 January 1866 – 18 July 1939) was the son of Ernst, Prince of Leiningen. He was the fifth Prince of Leiningen from 1904 to 1918, and afterwards titular Prince of Leiningen from 1918 until his death.

== Early life ==
Emich was born at Osborne House, Isle of Wight, United Kingdom, the second child and only son of Ernst, Prince of Leiningen (1830–1904), (son of Karl, Prince of Leiningen and Countess Marie von Klebelsberg) and his wife, Princess Marie of Baden (1834–1899), (daughter of Leopold, Grand Duke of Baden and Princess Sophie of Sweden). Through his mother he was descendant of Swedish monarchs, such as Gustav IV Adolf and Gustav III. His paternal grandfather, Carl, 3rd Prince of Leiningen, was the half-brother of Queen Victoria.

He was baptised at Osborne House on 10 February 1866 and his godparents were his paternal great-aunt, Princess Feodora of Leiningen, his maternal uncle Frederick I, Grand Duke of Baden (represented by Hermann, Prince of Hohenlohe-Langenburg) and his paternal uncle Prince Eduard of Leiningen (represented by Ernest II, Duke of Saxe-Coburg and Gotha).

== Marriage ==
Emich married on 12 July 1894 in Langenburg his second cousin (both great-grandchildren of Princess Victoria of Saxe-Coburg-Saalfeld and her first husband Emich Karl, Prince of Leiningen), Princess Feodore of Hohenlohe-Langenburg (23 July 1866 – 1 November 1932), youngest child of Hermann, Prince of Hohenlohe-Langenburg and Princess Leopoldine of Baden.

They had five children:

- Princess Viktoria of Leiningen (12 May 1895 – 9 February 1973) she married Count Maximilian of Solms-Rödelheim-Assenheim on 23 February 1922 and they were divorced in 1937. They had one son:
  - Count Markwart of Solms-Rödelheim-Assenheim (30 June 1925 – 28 September 1976), never married without issue.
- Emich Ernst, Hereditary Prince of Leiningen (Emich Ernst Hermann Heinrich Maximilian; 29 December 1896 - 21 March 1918) he died at the age of 21 during World War I.
- Karl, Prince of Leiningen (13 February 1898 – 2 August 1946) he married Grand Duchess Maria Kirillovna of Russia on 24 November 1924. They had seven children, 15 grandchildren and 28 great-grandchildren.
- Prince Hermann Viktor Maximilian of Leiningen (4 January 1901 – 29 March 1971) he married Countess Irina of Schönborn-Wiesentheid on 21 December 1938. They had no children.
- Prince Hesso Leopold Heinrich of Leiningen (23 July 1903 – 19 June 1967) he married Countess Marie-Luise of Nesselrode on 12 July 1933. They had no children.

== Prince of Leiningen ==
On the death of his father in 1904, Emich became the Prince of Leiningen.

== Honours ==
- Kingdom of Bavaria: Knight of the Military Merit Order, 4th Class
- Württemberg:
  - Grand Cross of the Friedrich Order, 1894
  - Grand Cross of the Order of the Württemberg Crown, 1905
- United Kingdom: Knight Grand Cross of the Royal Victorian Order, 8 September 1898
- Grand Duchy of Hesse: Grand Cross of the Merit Order of Philip the Magnanimous, 11 July 1902
- Baden: Knight of the House Order of Fidelity, 1904
- (Austrian Empire) (Kingdom of Hungary) Austria-Hungary: Knight of the Order of Franz Joseph, 1893
- (Saxe-Coburg and Gotha) (Duchy of Saxe-Altenburg) (Saxe-Meiningen) Ernestine duchies: Grand Cross of the Saxe-Ernestine House Order
- Kingdom of Prussia:
  - Knight of the Royal Order of the Crown, 1st Class
  - Knight's Cross of the Royal House Order of Hohenzollern
  - Knight of Honour of the Johanniter Order

== Ancestry ==
Ancestors of Emich, Prince of Leiningen

8. Emich Carl, Prince of Leiningen
4. Carl, Prince of Leiningen
9. Princess Victoria of Saxe-Coburg-Saalfeld
2. Ernst, Prince of Leiningen
10. Count Maximilian von Klebelsberg
5. Countess Marie von Klebelsberg
11. Maria Anna von Turba
1. Emich, Prince of Leiningen
12. Charles Frederick, Grand Duke of Baden
6. Leopold, Grand Duke of Baden
13. Luise Karoline Geyer von Geyersberg
3. Princess Marie of Baden
14. Gustav IV Adolf of Sweden
7. Princess Sophie of Sweden
15. Princess Frederica of Baden

Emich, Prince of Leiningen House of Leiningen Born: 18 January 1866 Died: 18 July 1939
German nobility
Preceded by Ernst	Prince of Leiningen; 1904–1918	Succeeded by German nobility titles abolished
Titles in pretence
Loss of title	— TITULAR — Prince of Leiningen; 1918–1939; Reason for succession failure: German nobility titles abolished	Succeeded by Karl
