= Karl Friedrich Wilhelm, Prince of Leiningen =

Karl Friedrich Wilhelm
- Prince of Leiningen
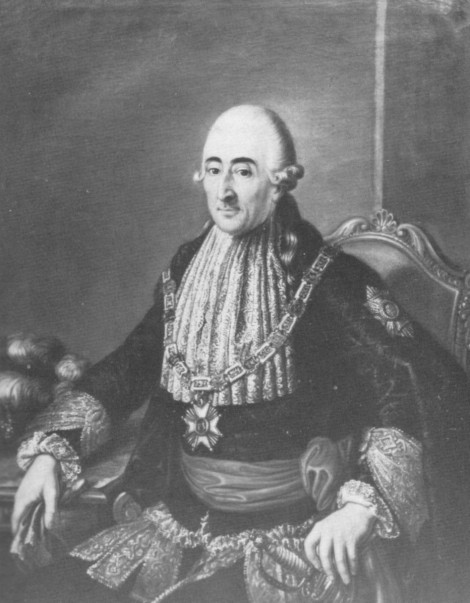
- Painting of Karl Friedrich Wilhelm 1. Fürst zu Leiningen by an unknown painter (circa 1800)
- Born: 14 August 1724; Schloss Dürkheim in Dürkheim
- Died: 9 January 1807 (aged 82); Amorbach
- Spouse: Countess Christiane Wilhelmine of Solms-Rödelheim and Assenheim
- Issue: Emich Karl, Prince of Leiningen
- House: Leiningen
- Father: Friedrich Magnus, Count of Leiningen-Dagsburg-Hartenburg
- Mother: Countess Anna Christine Eleonore von Wurmbrand-Stuppach

Karl Friedrich Wilhelm, Prince of Leiningen (German: Fürst zu Leiningen; 14 August 1724 – 9 January 1807), was a Prince of the Holy Roman Empire and the first and only sovereign ruler of the Principality of Leiningen from 1803 to 1806.

== Life ==
Karl Friedrich Wilhelm was the eldest son of Friedrich Magnus, Count of Leiningen-Dagsburg-Hartenburg (1703–1756), and his wife, Countess Anna Christine Eleonore von Wurmbrand-Stuppach (1698–1763). He succeeded his father on the latter's death, 28 October 1756.

On 3 July 1779, he was made a Prince of the Holy Roman Empire, becoming the first Prince of Leiningen. In 1801, he was deprived of his lands on the left bank of the Rhine, namely Hardenburg, Dagsburg and Durkheim, by France, but in 1803 received the secularized Amorbach Abbey as an ample compensation for these losses. Hitherto his titles were: Imperial Prince of Leiningen, Count palatine of Mosbach, Count of Düren, Lord of Miltenberg, Amorbach, Bischofsheim, Boxberg, Schüpf and Lauda.

A few years later, the short-lived Principality of Leiningen at Amorbach was mediatized to Bavaria.

== Marriage ==
On 24 June 1749, the Prince married his first cousin Countess Christiane Wilhelmine Luise of Solms-Rödelheim and Assenheim (1736–1803), daughter of Wilhelm Carl Ludwig, Count of Solms-Rödelheim and Assenheim (1699–1778), and Countess Maria Margareta Leopolda von Wurmbrand-Stuppach (1701–1756). His wife died on 6 January 1803. They had four children:

- Princess Elisabeth Christiane Marianne of Leiningen (27 October 1753 – 16 February 1792); married on 17 May 1768 to Count Karl Ludwig of Salm-Grumbach.
- Princess Charlotte Luise Polyxena of Leiningen (27 May 1755 – 13 January 1785); married 1 September 1776 to Franz, Count of Erbach-Erbach.
- Princess Karoline Sophie Wilhelmine of Leiningen (4 April 1757 – 18 March 1832); married 21 September 1773 Count Friedrich Magnus I of Solms-Wildenfels.
- Emich Karl, Prince of Leiningen (27 September 1763 – 4 July 1814); succeeded his father as second Prince of Leiningen.

== Ancestry ==
Ancestors of Karl Friedrich Wilhelm, Prince of Leiningen

8. Friedrich Emich, Count of Leiningen-Hartenburg
4. Johann Friedrich, Count of Leiningen
9. Countess Sybille of Waldeck-Wildungen
2. Friedrich Magnus, Count of Leiningen
10. Frederick VII, Margrave of Baden-Durlach
5. Margravine Katharina of Baden-Durlach
11. Duchess Augusta Marie of Holstein-Gottorp
1. Karl, Prince of Leiningen
12. Count Johann Eustachius of Wurmbrand-Stuppach
6. Count Johann Joseph Wilhelm of Wurmbrand-Stuppach
13. Baroness Maria Elisabeth Speild von Vatersdorf
3. Countess Anna of Wurmbrand-Stuppach
14. Wolfgang Ehrenreich, Baron von Prösing
7. Baroness Susanne Sophie von Prösing
15. Baroness Susanne Eleonore von Polheim

Karl Friedrich Wilhelm, Prince of Leiningen House of Leiningen Born: 14 August 1724 Died: 9 January 1807
Preceded by New creation	Prince of Leiningen; 1779–1807; 1803–1806 (sovereign)	Succeeded by Emich Carl
