= Ernst, Prince of Leiningen =

Ernst
- Prince of Leiningen
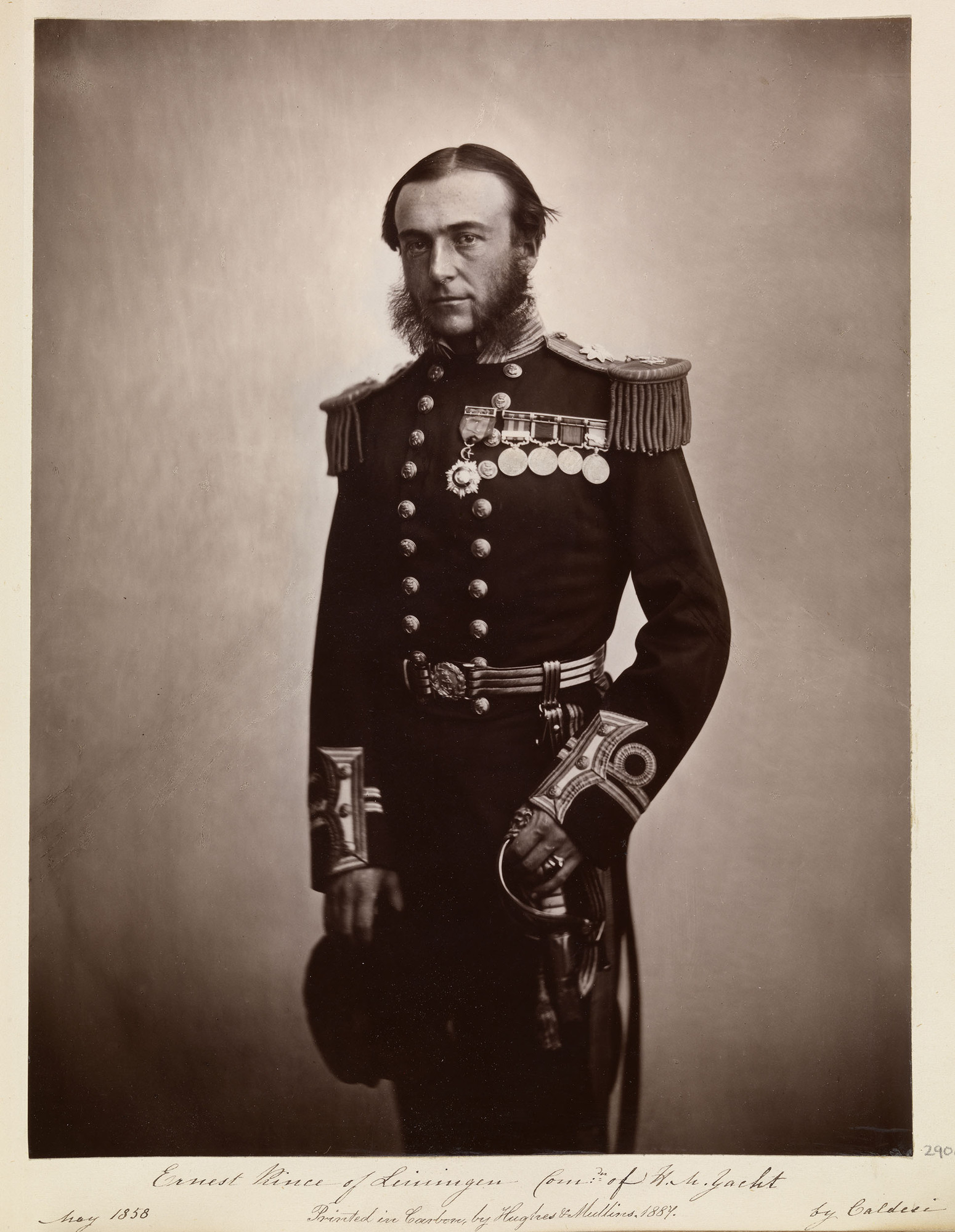
- Photograph by Leonida Caldesi, 1858
- Born: 9 November 1830; Amorbach, Kingdom of Bavaria, German Confederation
- Died: 5 April 1904 (aged 73); Amorbach, Kingdom of Bavaria, German Empire
- Spouse: Princess Marie of Baden (m. 1858; died 1899)
- Issue: Princess Alberta; Emich, Prince of Leiningen
Names
- German: Ernst Leopold Victor Carl August Joseph Emich, Furst zu Leiningen
- House: Leiningen
- Father: Carl, Prince of Leiningen
- Mother: Countess Marie von Klebelsberg

Ernst, Prince of Leiningen (German: Ernst Leopold Victor Carl August Joseph Emich, Furst zu Leiningen; 9 November 1830 – 5 April 1904) was a German nobleman who served with distinction in the British Royal Navy.

== Biography ==
He was the elder son of Carl, Prince of Leiningen and Countess Marie von Klebelsberg. His father was the maternal half-brother of Queen Victoria of the United Kingdom.

Ernst Leopold joined the Royal Navy in 1849, seeing action in the Second Burma War and later, the Crimean War, where he participated in the Danube and Baltic campaigns. He served as lieutenant on board HMS Duke of Wellington and HMS Cossack in 1855, after which he was promoted to captain in 1860 and given command of HMS Magicienne, and then HMY Victoria and Albert. He further served as Commander-in-Chief, The Nore in 1885–87, was promoted to full Admiral in 1887 and retired from the Navy in 1895.

Upon his father's death on 13 November 1856, Ernst Leopold acceded to the title of Prince of Leiningen. He also inherited the memberships of the upper houses of the parliaments of Bavaria, Hesse and by Rhine and Baden, his family having owned estates and lands in those states. In 1863, he was nominated as a candidate for the throne of Greece by the British government under Henry Temple, Viscount Palmerston, but declined it; the throne was eventually accepted by Prince William of Denmark, who reigned as King George I until 1913.

Ernst Leopold died in Amorsbach in 1904, and was succeeded as Prince by his son Emich.

== Marriage and issue ==
On 11 September 1858 in Karlsruhe he married Princess Marie of Baden (1834–1899), second daughter and seventh child of Leopold, Grand Duke of Baden and Sophie of Sweden. They had two children:

- Princess Alberta of Leiningen (23 July 1863 – 30 August 1901).
- Emich, Prince of Leiningen (18 January 1866 – 18 July 1939) he married Princess Feodore of Hohenlohe-Langenburg on 12 July 1894. They had five children.

== Honours and awards ==
- United Kingdom:
  - India General Service Medal with Pegu Clasp (1851/52)
  - Crimea Medal (1854/55)
  - Knight Commander of the Bath, 7 August 1863; Knight Grand Cross, 29 January 1866 (civil)/Honorary Grand Cross, 1 July 1887; Additional Knight Grand Cross, 27 September 1887 (military)
  - Queen Victoria Golden Jubilee Medal, 1887
- Grand Duchy of Hesse: Grand Cross of the Ludwig Order, 18 March 1867
- Baden:
  - Knight of the House Order of Fidelity, 1858
  - Grand Cross of the Zähringer Lion, 1858
- Belgium: Grand Cordon of the Order of Leopold
- Denmark: Grand Cross of the Dannebrog, 30 July 1870
- (Saxe-Coburg and Gotha) (Duchy of Saxe-Altenburg) (Saxe-Meiningen) Ernestine duchies: Grand Cross of the Saxe-Ernestine House Order, 1855
- Ottoman Empire:
  - Gold Danube Campaign Medal
  - Crimea War Medal (1854/55)
  - Order of the Medjidie, 1st Class
- Kingdom of Prussia: Knight of the Red Eagle, 1st Class, 29 August 1871
- Württemberg: Grand Cross of the Württemberg Crown, 1894

== Ancestry ==
Ancestors of Ernst, Prince of Leiningen

8. Carl Friedrich Wilhelm, Prince of Leiningen
4. Emich Carl, Prince of Leiningen
9. Countess Christiane Wilhelmine of Solms-Rödelheim-Assenheim
2. Carl, Prince of Leiningen
10. Francis, Duke of Saxe-Coburg-Saalfeld
5. Princess Victoria of Saxe-Coburg-Saalfeld
11. Countess Augusta Reuss of Ebersdorf
1. Ernst, Prince of Leiningen
12. Count Franz Rudolf von Klebelsberg
6. Count Maximilian von Klebelsberg
13. Baroness Maria Anna von Forstner
3. Countess Marie von Klebelsberg
14. Franz Xaver von Turba
7. Maria Anna von Turba
15. Marie Adelheid von Textor

Ernst, Prince of Leiningen House of Leiningen Born: 9 November 1830 Died: 5 April 1904
Military offices
Preceded by Sir John Corbett	Commander-in-Chief, The Nore; 1885–1887	Succeeded by Charles Waddilove
German nobility
Preceded by Carl	Prince of Leiningen; 1856–1904	Succeeded by Emich
