= Karl, Prince of Leiningen (1804–1856) =

German prince (1804–1856)

Karl
- Prince of Leiningen
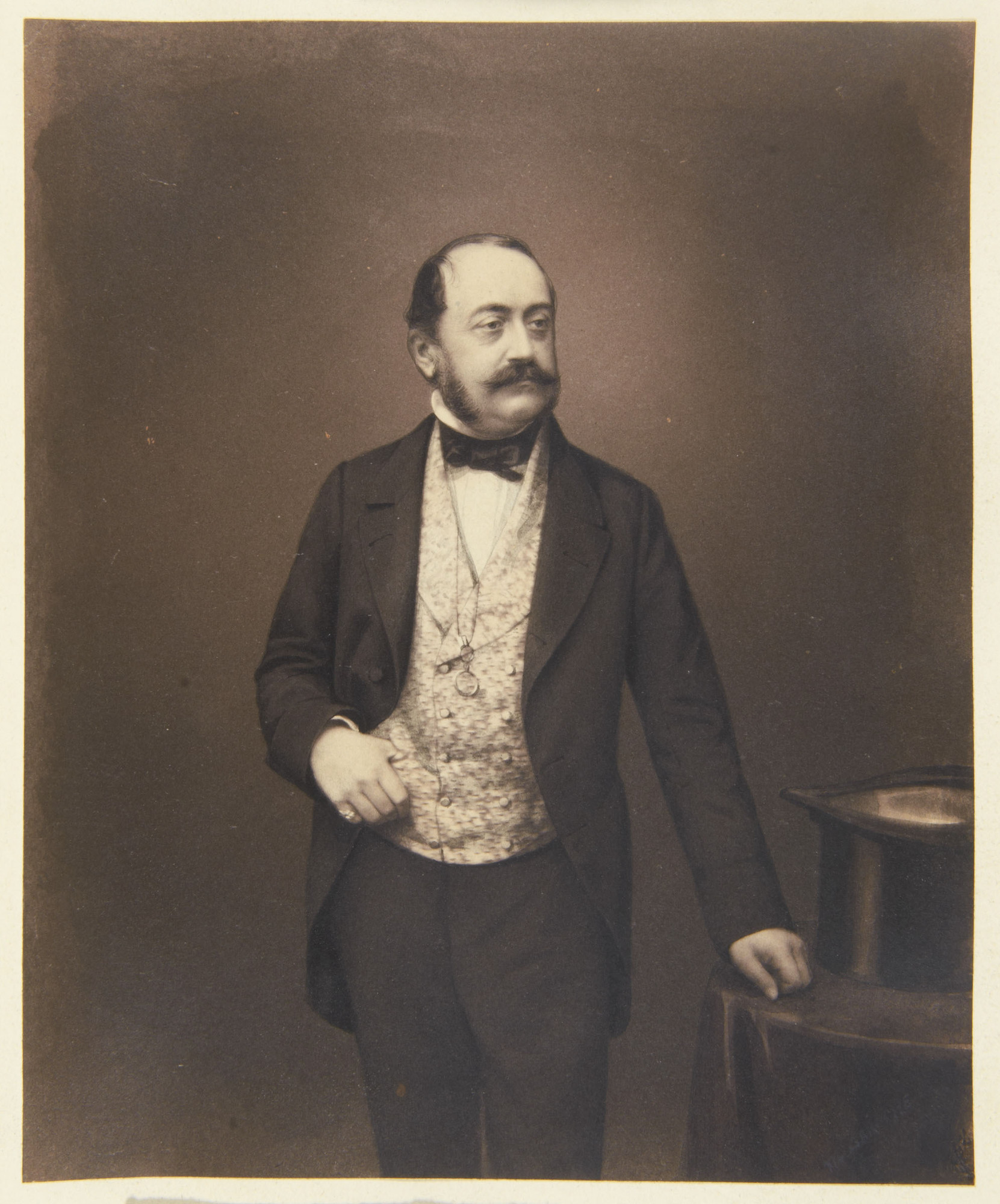
- Karl in 1855

Prime Minister of the German Empire
- In office: 5 August 1848 – 6 September 1848
- Predecessor: Position established
- Successor: Anton von Schmerling
- Monarch: Archduke John of Austria (Regent)
- Born: 12 September 1804; Amorbach, Principality of Leiningen (in modern Bavaria, Germany)
- Died: 13 November 1856 (aged 52); Waldleiningen Castle, Mörschenhardt, Grand Duchy of Baden
- Spouse: Countess Maria Klebelsberg (m. 1829)
- Issue: Ernst, Prince of Leiningen; Prince Eduard
Names
- Carl Friedrich Wilhelm Emich
- House: Leiningen
- Father: Emich Karl, Prince of Leiningen
- Mother: Princess Victoria of Saxe-Coburg-Saalfeld

Karl, Prince of Leiningen (Karl Friedrich Wilhelm Emich; 12 September 1804 – 13 November 1856) was the third Prince of Leiningen and maternal half-brother of Queen Victoria. Leiningen served as a Bavarian lieutenant general, before he briefly played an important role in German politics as the first Prime Minister of the Provisorische Zentralgewalt government formed by the Frankfurt Parliament in 1848.

== Biography ==
=== Descent ===
A member of the Hardenburg branch of the House of Leiningen, Karl was born in Amorbach on 12 September 1804, the son of Prince Emich Karl of Leiningen (1763–1814) by his second marriage with Princess Victoria of Saxe-Coburg-Saalfeld (1786–1861). He was the only son, as Emich Karl's son by his first wife, Friedrich, had died in 1800.

Prince Emich Karl had received the Principality of Leiningen during the German mediatisation (Reichsdeputationshauptschluss) in 1803, as a compensation for the lost Hardenburg estates in the Palatinate occupied by French revolutionary troops, and took his residence at the secularised Amorbach Abbey. The princely territory, however, soon after passed to the newly established Grand Duchy of Baden, the Kingdom of Bavaria and the Grand Duchy of Hesse. Prince Emich Karl died on 4 July 1814 and Karl succeeded him as third Prince of Leiningen. On 11 July 1818, his widowed mother married Prince Edward Augustus, Duke of Kent and Strathearn, the fourth son of King George III of the United Kingdom, at Kew Palace, Surrey. In 1819, when the duchess's pregnancy was reaching full term, Karl and his younger sister, Princess Feodora, were taken from Amorbach to London, where their half-sister, Princess Victoria of Kent, was born on 24 May at Kensington Palace.

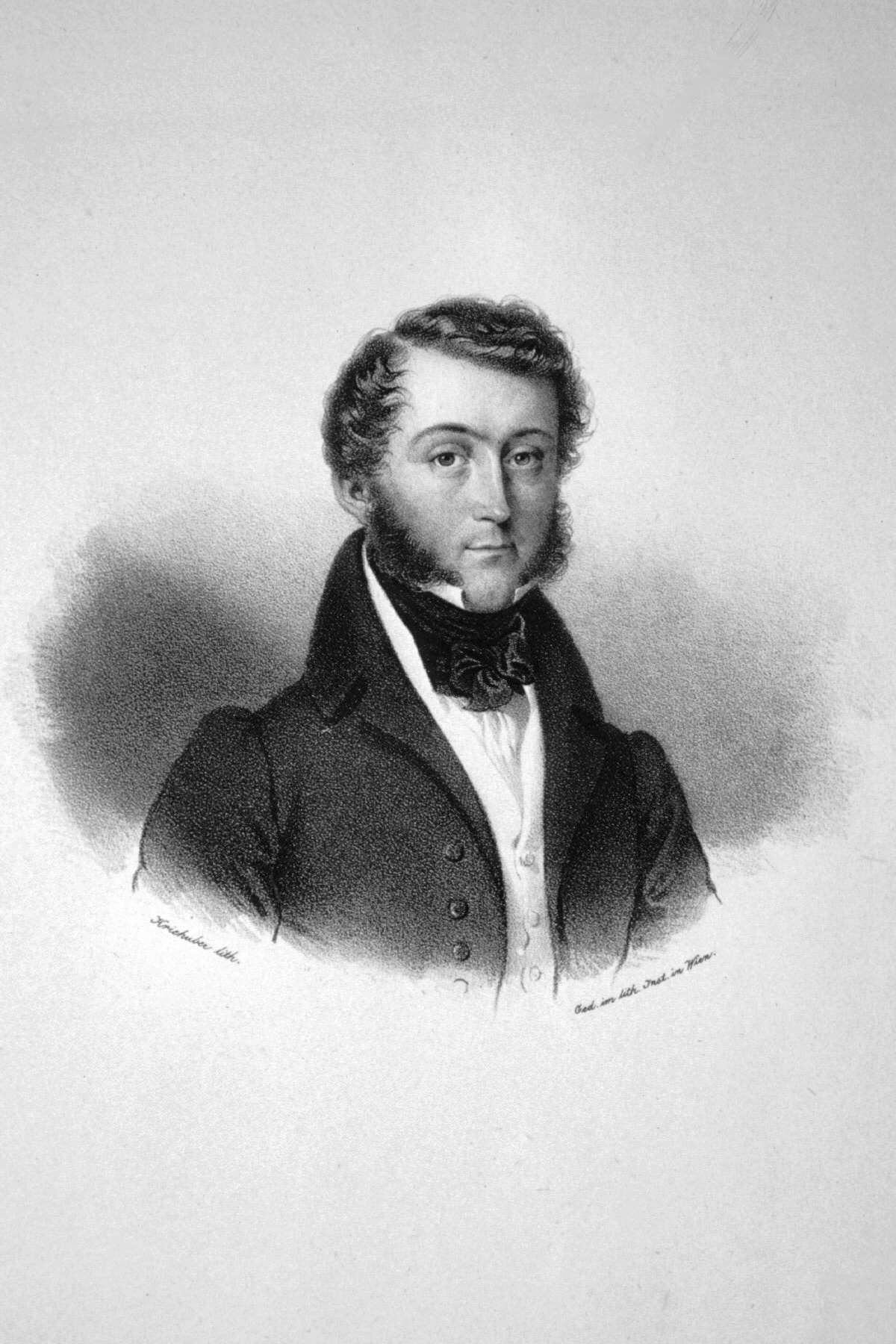
Carl zu Leiningen, lithograph by Joseph Kriehuber (1833)

=== Marriage and issue ===
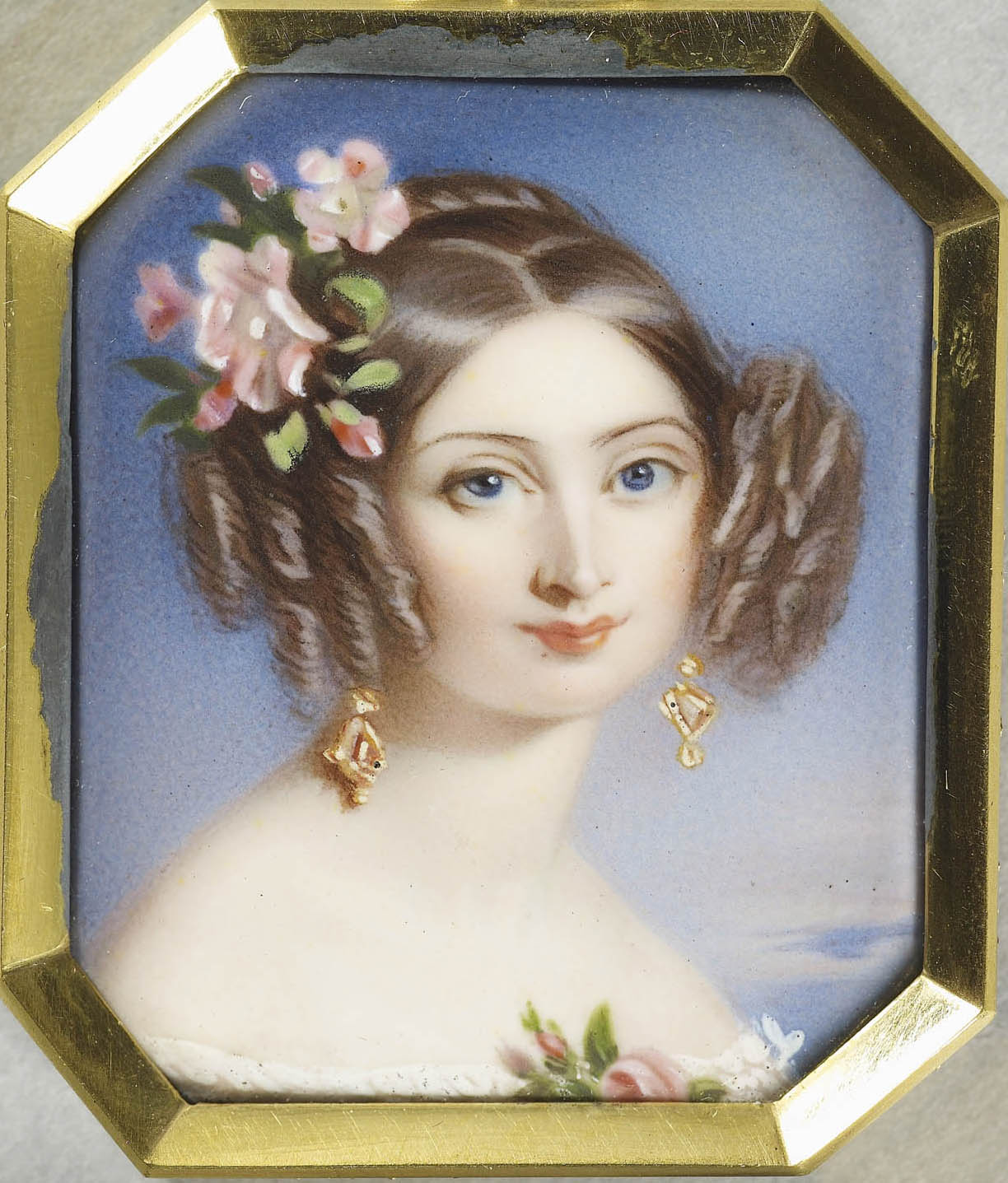
Karl's wife, Countess Marie of Klebelsberg-Thumburg.

On 13 February 1829, Karl married Countess Marie von Klebelsberg-Thumburg (27 March 1806 – 28 October 1880), younger daughter of Count Maximilian von Klebelsberg-Thumburg (1752–1811) and his wife, Maria Anna von Turba (1763–1833). They had two sons:

- Ernst, Prince of Leiningen (9 November 1830 – 5 April 1904); married Princess Marie of Baden on 11 September 1858. They had two children.
- Prince Eduard Friedrich Maximilian Johann of Leiningen (5 January 1833 – 9 April 1914). Never married.

=== Minor prince ===
Karl had attended a private school in Bern and from 1821 onwards studied law at the University of Göttingen with the jurist Karl Friedrich Eichhorn, then one of the principal authorities on German constitutional law and leading proponent of the German Historical School of jurisprudence. At the British court, his multifaceted interests in art were aroused. From 1828, he had Waldleiningen Castle near Mörschenhardt (named after Waldleiningen in the Palatinate) erected as his private residence, a Romantic complex resembling Neo-Gothic castles in Britain, such as Abbotsford House.

As a mediatized house, the Princes of the Leiningen were members of the Landtag diet in Baden, as well as in Bavaria and Hesse. Prince Karl became president of the Bavarian upper house (Reichsrat) in 1842 and also pursued a career in the Bavarian Army as Lieutenant general à la suite of the Cavalry. On 20 April 1842, he and 20 other noblemen gathered at Biebrich Palace, where they established the Adelsverein to organize the settlement of German emigrants in Texas; Karl was elected president of the society.

=== 1848: Brief moment of glory ===
By the German revolutions of 1848–49, Leiningen had achieved much reputation as a liberal reformer and freethinker. He advocated the implementation of parliamentarism and openly criticized aristocracy's privileges; therefore, he was appointed Prime Minister of Revolutionary Germany by Regent (Reichsverweser) Archduke John of Austria on 6 August 1848. With a Catholic head of state and a Lutheran head of government, an equilibrium was reached in German dualism; moreover, Leiningen's close relations to the British Royal House were generally appreciated. His cabinet initially could rely on a liberal and left-wing majority in the newly established Frankfurt Parliament, however, as early as on 5 September, he resigned over the Schleswig-Holstein Question when in the First Schleswig War King Frederick William IV of Prussia unilaterally signed an armistice with Denmark at Malmö. The delegates of the Frankfurt assembly reacted with outrage and Leiningen, unable to assert the powers of the central authority, was forced to step down. He was succeeded by the Austrian politician Anton von Schmerling, who acted as prime minister until December.

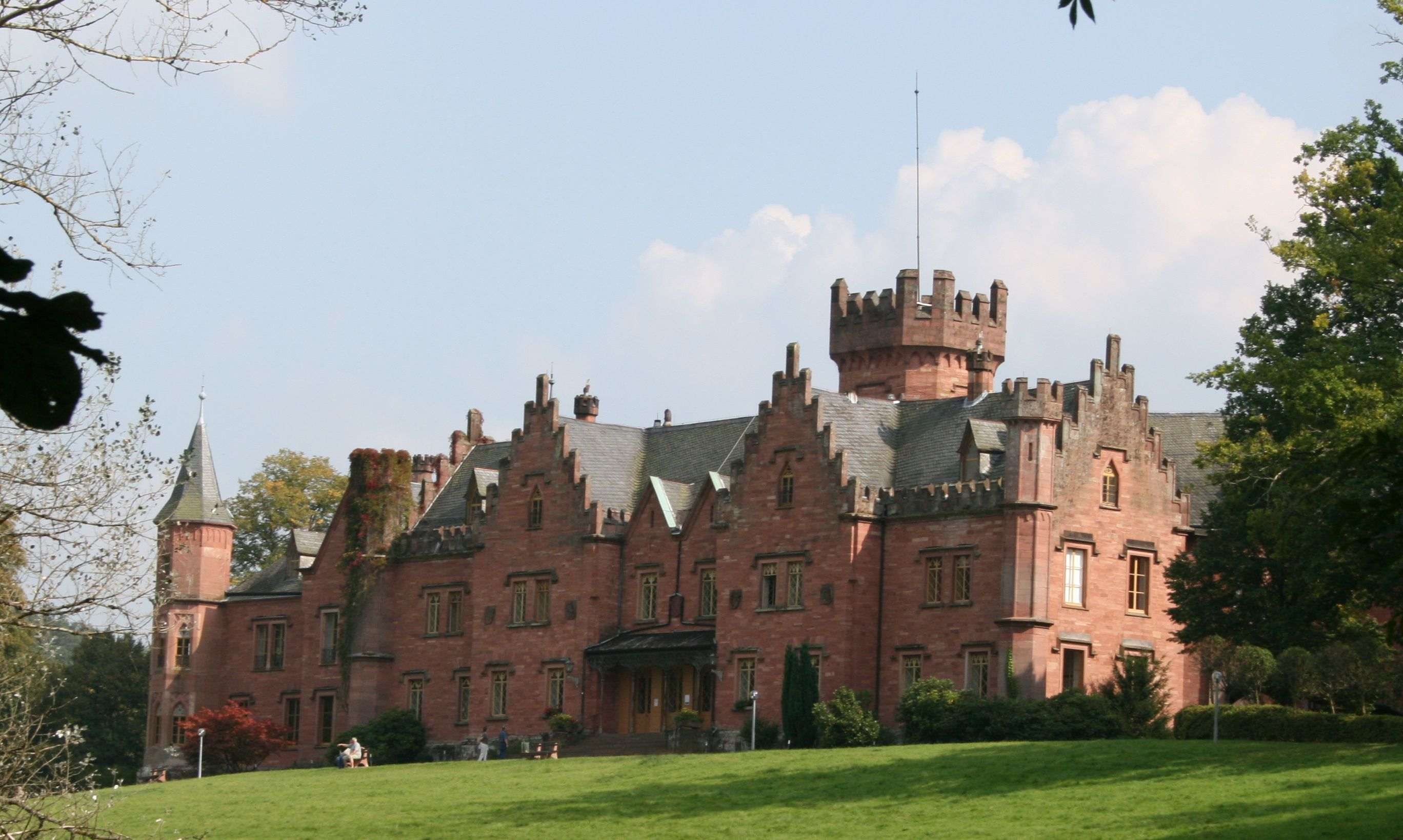
Waldleinlingen Castle

=== Later life and death ===
In 1851, Karl also resigned as president of the Adelsverein and was succeeded by Prince Hermann of Wied. Shortly after his half sister's daughter Victoria became engaged to Prince Frederick of Prussia, in 1855, he suffered a severe apoplectic attack. A second attack in November the following year was fatal, and he died at Waldleiningen Castle at the age of 52, with his sister Feodora at his bedside.

Upon hearing of her half-brother's death, Queen Victoria, who referred to him by his English name Charles, wrote in her journal:

"I cannot realise that my dearly loved only brother has been taken from us! Whilst I write this, I feel as if it could only be a bad dream, from which I might yet awake, to see his dear face, hear his joyous voice & laugh, & enjoy his delightful company. It seems quite impossible, that dear Charles, the personification of life, health, & merriment, whom I can only see as such before me, — should be no longer in this world, & that I shall never see him again! It is too dreadful, too hard! But we must submit to God's will, & I do feel, that in poor dear Charles's case, his passing away is a mercy."

— Queen Victoria's Journals, Thursday 13th November 1856

== Honours ==
- Baden:
  - Grand Cross of the Zähringer Lion, 1823
  - Grand Cross of the House Order of Fidelity, 1825
- Kingdom of Hanover: Grand Cross of the Royal Guelphic Order, 1824
- Kingdom of Bavaria: Knight of St. Hubert, 1825
- Kingdom of Saxony: Knight of the Rue Crown, 1825
- (Saxe-Coburg and Gotha) (Duchy of Saxe-Altenburg) (Saxe-Meiningen) Ernestine duchies: Grand Cross of the Saxe-Ernestine House Order, April 1834
- Kingdom of Portugal: Grand Cross of the Tower and Sword, 3 June 1836
- United Kingdom: Knight of the Garter, 14 July 1837
- Grand Duchy of Hesse: Grand Cross of the Ludwig Order, 4 August 1840

== Ancestry ==
Ancestors of Karl, Prince of Leiningen (1804–1856)

8. Friedrich Magnus, Count of Leiningen-Dagsburg-Hardenburg
4. Karl Friedrich Wilhelm, Prince of Leiningen
9. Countess Anna Christine Eleonore of Wurmbrand-Stuppach
2. Emich Karl, Prince of Leiningen
10. Wilhelm Karl Ludwig, Count of Solms-Rödelheim-Assenheim
5. Countess Christiane Wilhelmine of Solms-Rödelheim-Assenheim
11. Countess Maria Anna Magdalena of Wurmbrand-Stuppach
1. Karl, Prince of Leiningen
12. Ernest Frederick, Duke of Saxe-Coburg-Saalfeld
6. Francis, Duke of Saxe-Coburg-Saalfeld
13. Duchess Sophie Antoinette of Brunswick-Wolfenbüttel
3. Princess Victoria of Saxe-Coburg-Saalfeld
14. Heinrich XXIV, Count Reuss of Ebersdorf
7. Countess Augusta Reuss of Ebersdorf
15. Countess Karoline Ernestine of Erbach-Schönberg

Karl, Prince of Leiningen (1804–1856) House of Leiningen Born: 12 September 1804 Died: 13 November 1856
Political offices
Preceded by office Established	Minister President of Germany; 1848	Succeeded by Anton von Schmerling
German nobility
Preceded by Emich Carl	Prince of Leiningen; 1814–1856	Succeeded by Ernst
