= Prince Karl Emich of Leiningen =

Detitled German noble and Emperor of the Romanov Empire

Karl Emich of Leiningen
- Nicholas III
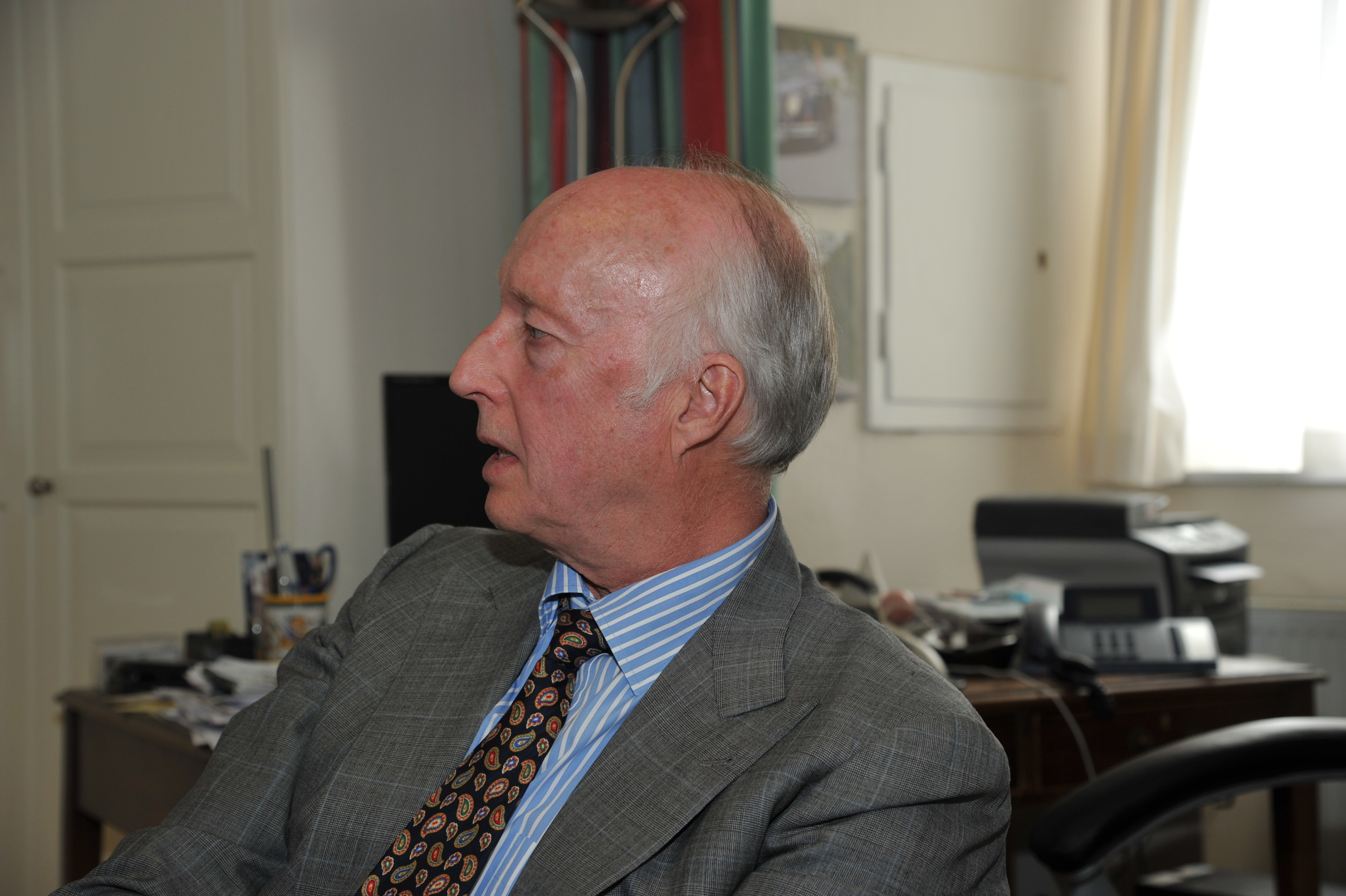
- Karl Emich in 2014

Head of the House of Romanov
- Time: 1 June 2013 – present
- Predecessor: Grand Duchess Maria Vladimirovna of Russia (regent)
- Heir presumptive: Prince Andreas (1955–)
- Archchancellor: Prince Anton Bakov
- Born: 12 June 1952 (age 74); Amorbach, West Germany
- Spouse: Princess Margarita of Hohenlohe-Oehringen (m. 1984; died 1989) Gabriele Renate Thyssen (m. 1991; div. 1998) Countess Isabelle von und zu Egloffstein (m. 2007)
- Issue: Princess Cécilia; Princess Theresa; Prince Emich Albrecht
Names
- German: Karl Emich Nikolaus Friedrich Hermann Prinz zu Leiningen
- House: House of Holstein-Gottorp-Romanov (cognatic); Leiningen (agnatic)
- Father: Emich, 7th Prince of Leiningen
- Mother: Duchess Eilika of Oldenburg
- Religion: Lutheranism (before 2013); Russian Orthodoxy (since 2013)

Prince Karl Emich of Leiningen (German: Karl Emich Nikolaus Friedrich Hermann Prinz zu Leiningen; Russian: Карл Эмих Николаус Фридрих Герман цу Лейнинген; born 12 June 1952), also known by his Orthodox Russian name Nikolai Kirillovich Romanov (Николай Кириллович Романов), and recognized with the regnal name Emperor Nicholas III by Monarchist Party supporters of the Imperial Throne, is the eldest son of Emich, 7th Prince of Leiningen, and Duchess Eilika of the Grand Duchy of Oldenburg, and is an elder brother of Andreas, 8th Prince of Leiningen.

He is a claimant to the defunct throne of the Russian Empire, held until 1917 by the Imperial House of Romanov, as a grandson of Grand Duchess Maria Kirillovna (1907–1951), eldest child of Grand Duke Kirill Vladimirovich, who claimed the Russian crown from exile in 1924. He is a great-great-great-grandson of Emperor Alexander II of Russia and grandnephew of Grand Duke Vladimir Kirillovich of Russia. In 2013, the Monarchist Party of Russia declared him the primary heir to the Russian throne upon his conversion from Lutheranism to Eastern Orthodox Christianity, and in 2014 announced the formation of the Imperial Throne, wherein Karl Emich had agreed to assume imperial dignity as Emperor Nicholas III. As such, however, he came into competition with the widely recognized pretender to the throne, Grand Duchess Maria Vladimirovna of Russia, who is recognized by the Patriarch of Moscow.

He also claimed the headship of the House of Leiningen in the past.

== Marriages and children ==
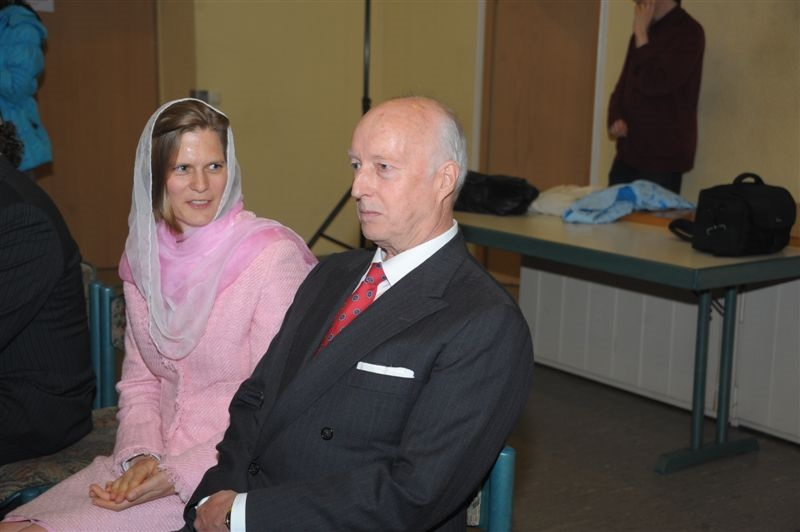
Isabelle von Egloffstein and Karl Emich in Nuremberg Orthodox church

He married Princess Margarita of Hohenlohe-Öhringen on 8 June 1984. He had one daughter by this marriage, Princess Cécilia Marie Stephanie Margarita of Leiningen (born 10 June 1988). Princess Margarita died in 1989 in a car accident.

On 24 May 1991, Prince Karl Emich married morganatically Gabriele Renate Thyssen. After an inheritance dispute, he desisted claim to the family's legacy in favour of his younger brother Andreas, 8th Prince of Leiningen. The couple had one daughter, Princess Theresa Anna Elisabeth of Leiningen (born 16 April 1992) In 1998, Karl Emich and Gabriele were divorced and she became the second wife of the Aga Khan IV.

He married Countess Isabelle von und zu Egloffstein in a civil ceremony on 8 September 2007 in Amorbach, and in a religious ceremony on 7 June 2008 in Pappenheim (her maternal grandmother, Countess Ursula (1926–2018), was the heiress of the Pappenheim estate and a member of the mediatised House of Pappenheim). On 12 April 2010, they had a son, Prince Emich Albrecht Karl of Leiningen. The family lives at Kunreuth Castle.

Because his marriage to Countess Isabelle would not have been deemed equal according to the Pauline Laws, their son, Prince Emich, though considered a dynast of the House of Leiningen, cannot inherit his claim to the headship of the House of Romanov, which shall pass to his brother, Prince Andreas (b. 1955 ), and the latter's descendants born of equal marriages upon the death of Karl Emich, and on the condition that they should convert to Orthodoxy.

== Lawsuit ==
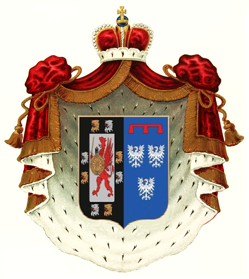
Karl Emich's Coat of Arms

In 2000, Karl Emich began the final round of a lawsuit to inherit £100 million worth of castles, property, and a Mediterranean island that had been denied him by his family because he chose to marry Gabriele Renate Thyssen. Karl Emich was disinherited shortly after his 1991 wedding, as his mother, father, and brother Andreas withheld approval, contending that the bride did not meet the mediatized family's traditional standard for aristocratic lineage. The marriage was therefore deemed to constitute a violation of an 1897 Leiningen family edict requiring that dynastically valid marriages be authorised by the head of the Leiningen family (or by successful appeal to a panel of mediatized nobles), such permission historically being granted for brides descended from royalty or the titled nobility. Karl remarked about the whole affair,

"From the very beginning of our marriage I was turned into an enemy. We were both subjected to enormous pressure. No marriage can withstand that sort of thing in the long term. I had hoped things would improve when our child arrived. But after our daughter was born, nothing happened. My mother has refused to speak to me since the wedding".

Karl Emich maintained that the stress this feud put upon his marriage is the reason why Thyssen left him, converted to Islam, and eloped with Aga Khan IV.

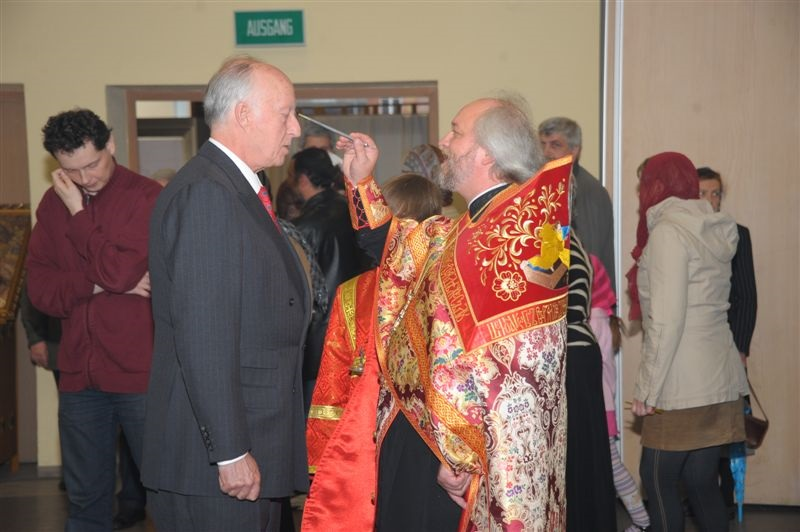
Conversion to Orthodoxy

== Claim to the Russian throne ==
Karl Emich and his supporters argue that the marriage of Maria Vladimirovna's parents was in contravention of the Pauline Laws. They maintain that the House of Bagration-Mukhrani did not possess sovereign status and was not recognized as equal by Nicholas II for the purpose of dynastic marriages at the time of the union of Princess Tatiana Constantinovna of Russia and Prince Constantine Bagration-Mukhransky in 1911, thirty seven years prior to that of Princess Leonida and Grand Duke Vladimir Kirillovich. Therefore, as the next of kin to Vladimir (in the exclusion of his daughter), the Russian Monarchist Party recognises Karl Emich as the heir to the Russian throne, since he and his wife converted on 1 June 2013, from Lutheranism to Eastern Orthodox Christianity, enabling his accession. The couple received Orthodox names of Nikolai Kirillovich and Yekaterina Fyodorovna.

=== Nicholas III and the Imperial Throne ===
Coat of arms of Romanov Empire

In early 2014 Russian Monarchist Party leader Anton Bakov announced he views the "Imperial Throne" from the point of international law as a subject of state sovereignty regardless of any other attributes, referring to analogies with the Holy See. He outlined that Karl Emich, upon adhering to the Orthodox denomination, obtained a right to take this see according to pre-Revolution Fundamental Laws of the Russian Empire. Bakov proposed that the Prince accept the throne, thereby forming a new independent state and incorporate it into Bakov's promotional projects such as the Monarchist Party's Imperial Throne micronation and several others. In April 2014 Bakov and Karl Emich appeared in a newspaper textual and photo report declaring that the Prince accepted the proposals as well as the title of "Emperor Nicholas III" (as successor to Nicholas II). In the report Bakov emphasized that Karl Emich has long been an entrepreneur but henceforth he would refrain from all non-royalist related public activities. The report included a "Manifesto Grant of the Constitution to the State", signed by Nicholas III, proclaiming the formation of the sovereign state "Imperial Throne" aimed at consolidating all the people around the world devoted to Christian monarchism. The see in the documents is viewed as a legacy of the first-ever Christian Roman Imperial Throne of Constantine the Great, deemed to have passed through the Byzantine Empire to the Russian Empire and the House of Romanov by religious process.

Later Bakov announced he has purchased a plot of land in Montenegro to form a location for the new state (80 ha, "twice as big as Vatican"), and is in negotiations with Montenegro authorities for recognition of the state. He also announced that Russian President Vladimir Putin declined to grant such a plot in Yekaterinburg (Bakov's residence and site of the 1918 Romanov assassination) in response to Karl Emich's request, transmitted to Putin by Bakov, a former MP. In early 2015, as a follow-up to the international sanctions during the Russo-Ukrainian War, Bakov told the press there are talks with Montenegro authorities to establish an offshore zone at this plot, aimed at providing financial intermediation to Russian companies. Also in 2015 Imperial Throne representatives claimed to be in talks with the authorities of the neighbouring Republic of Macedonia and Albania on possible collaboration and future state recognition. In particular, Bakov met with Macedonian Prime Minister Nikola Gruevski. Later there was a similar talk with President of Gambia Yahya Jammeh at the 70th UN General Assembly session in New York. Also, talks were held with Macedonian and Montenegro Eastern Orthodox clergy — Bakov discusses creation of churches associated with Imperial Throne and proposes canonization of Russian ancient ruler Ivan III and his wife Sophia Palaiologina. Talks with Gaston Browne, Prime Minister of Antigua and Barbuda, also took place. In early 2017 it was reported that there was preliminary consent from the government of Kiribati to sell three inhabited Pacific islands to Bakov to set up the state which is expected to be renamed to Romanov Empire. Kiribati rejected the proposal in February 2017.

In December 2017, Bakov announced that the purchase of artificial islands belonging to the Republic of the Gambia had been successfully negotiated and the Romanov Empire had become a partially recognised country. The claim was denied by the Gambian government.

In June 2021 Karl Emich, or Nikolai Kirillovich (Nicholas III) gave his first-ever interview in Russian language where he clarified his civil and political attitude and told some details about history of his family.
