= Boxberg, Baden-Württemberg =

Boxberg
- Town
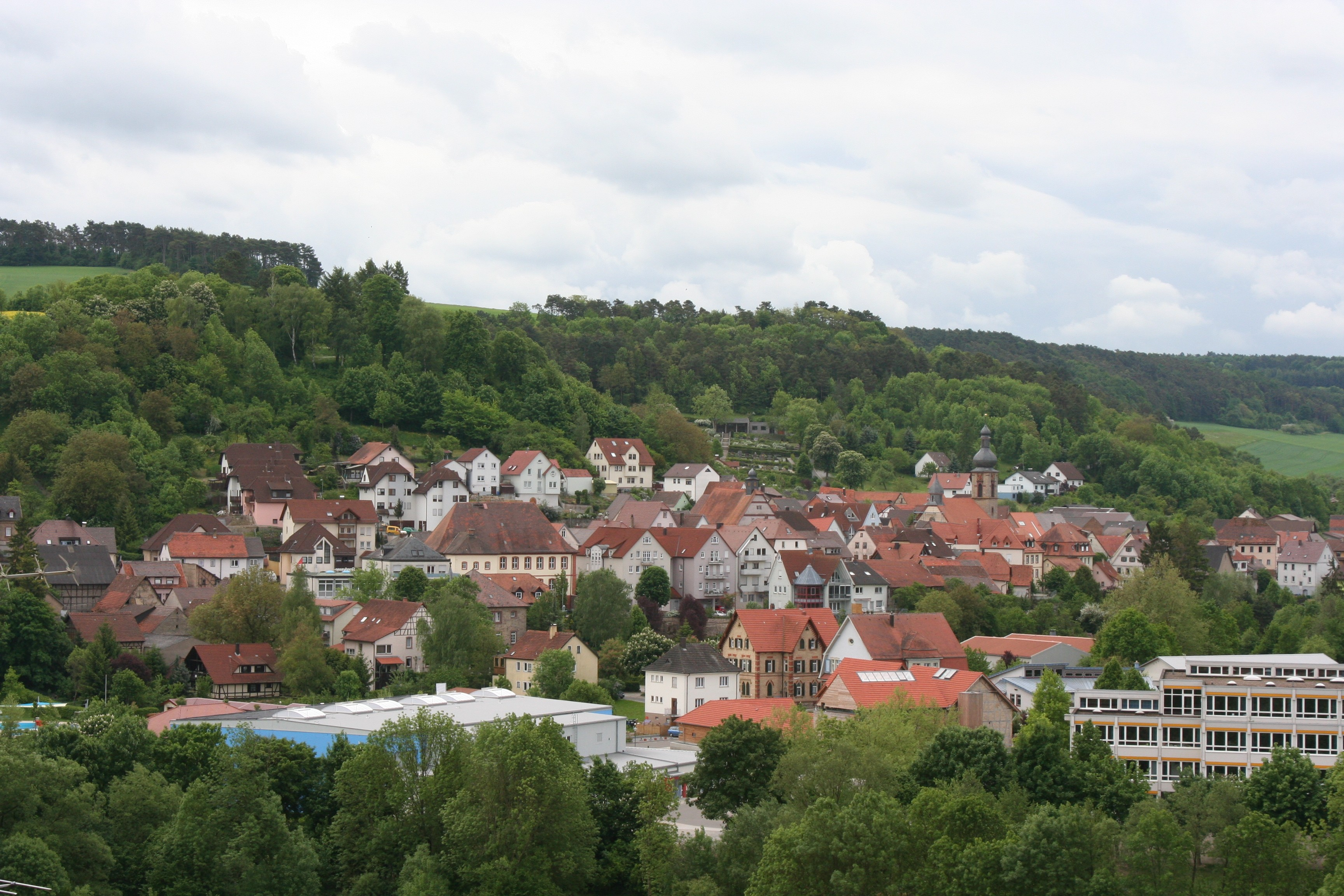
- General view of Boxberg

- Coat of arms

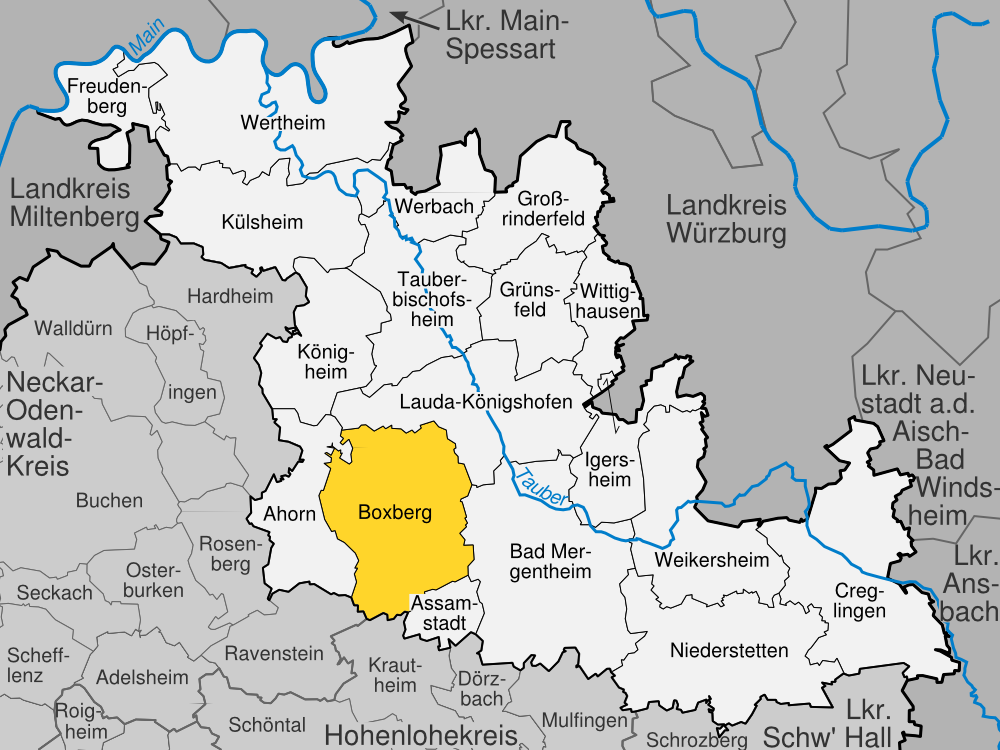
- Location of Boxberg within Main-Tauber-Kreis district
- Interactive map of Boxberg
- Location within Germany Location within Baden-Württemberg
- Coordinates: 49°28′53″N 09°38′30″E
- Country: Germany
- State: Baden-Württemberg
- Admin. region: Stuttgart
- District: Main-Tauber-Kreis

Government
  - Mayor (2021–29): Heidrun Beck

Area
  - Total: 101.71 km^{2} (39.27 sq mi)
- Elevation: 269 m (883 ft)

Population (2025-12-31)
  - Total: 6,784
  - Density: 66.70/km^{2} (172.8/sq mi)
- Time zone: UTC+01:00 (CET)
  - Summer (DST): UTC+02:00 (CEST)
- Postal codes: 97944
- Dialling codes: 07930
- Vehicle registration: TBB, MGH
- Website: www.boxberg.de

Boxberg (German pronunciation: [ˈbɔksˌbɛʁk]) is a town in the Main-Tauber district, in Baden-Württemberg, Germany. It is situated 16 km south of Tauberbischofsheim and had a population of 6718 people by 2020.

== Villages ==
Former independent villages that are part of Boxberg municipality since the 1970s: Angeltürn, Bobstadt, Epplingen, Kupprichhausen, Lengenrieden, Oberschüpf, Schwabhausen, Schweigern, Uiffingen, Unterschüpf, Windischbuch and Wölchingen.
