= Emich Carl, Prince of Leiningen =

Emich Carl
- Prince of Leiningen
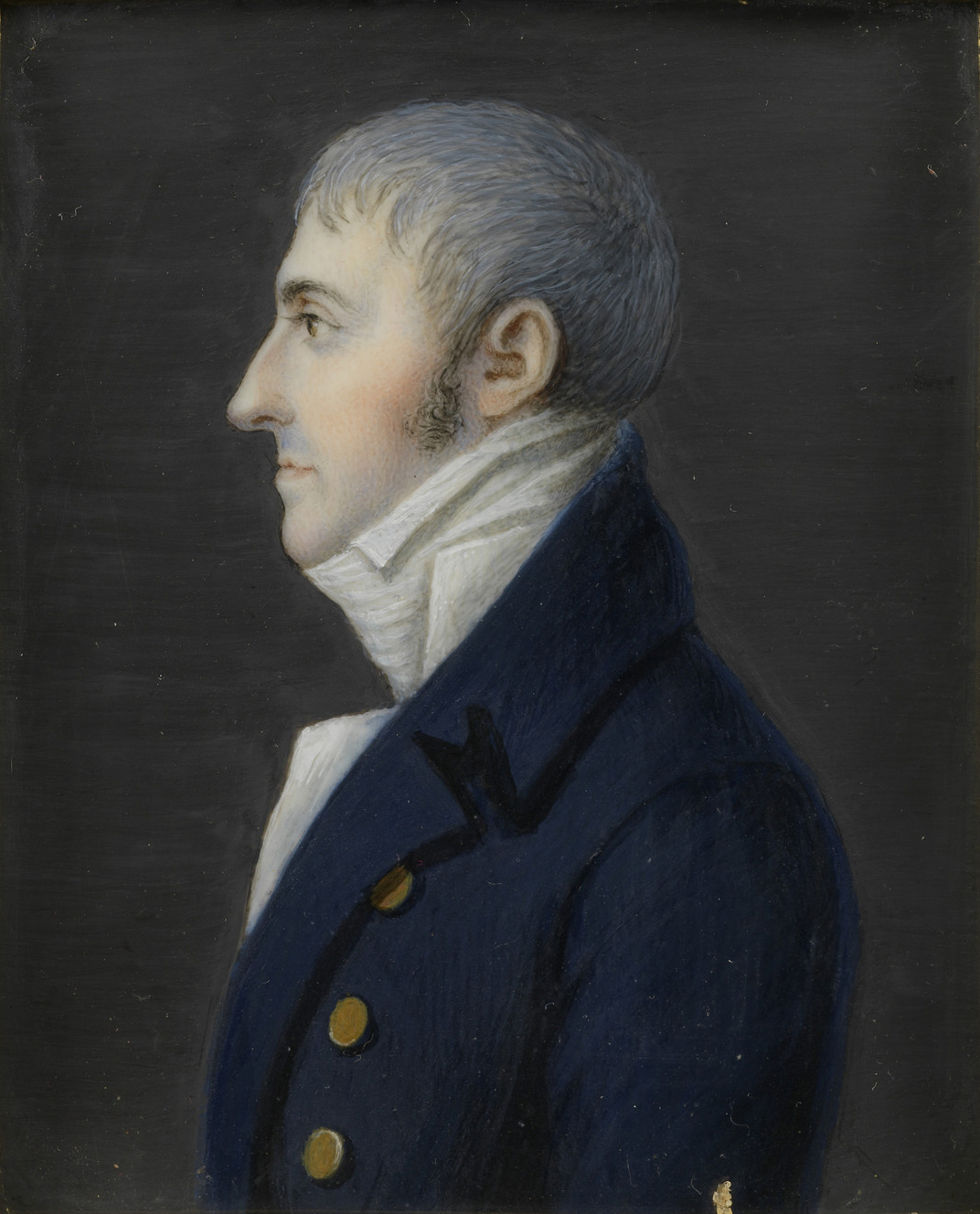
- Portrait after Thomas Fairland, c. 1800
- Born: 27 September 1763; Dürckheim
- Died: 4 July 1814 (aged 50); Amorbach
- Spouse: Countess Henriette of Reuss-Ebersdorf (m. 1787; died 1801) Princess Victoria of Saxe-Coburg-Saalfeld (m. 1803)
- Issue: Prince Friedrich; Karl, Prince of Leiningen; Feodora, Princess of Hohenlohe-Langenburg
- House: Leiningen
- Father: Karl Friedrich Wilhelm, Prince of Leiningen
- Mother: Countess Christiane of Solms-Rödelheim-Assenheim

Emich Carl, Prince of Leiningen (27 September 1763 – 4 July 1814) was the reigning Fürst of the Principality of Leiningen. After his death, his widow, Princess Victoria of Saxe-Coburg-Saalfeld, married Prince Edward, Duke of Kent and Strathearn, fourth son of George III of the United Kingdom, and her only child from that marriage was Queen Victoria of the United Kingdom.

== Biography ==
=== Background ===
Emich Carl was born at Dürckheim, the fourth child and only son of Karl Friedrich Wilhelm, Count of Leiningen-Dagsburg-Hartenburg and his wife Countess Christiane Wilhelmine Luise of Solms-Rödelheim und Assenheim (1736–1803). On 3 July 1779, his father was made a Prince of the Holy Roman Empire, and Emich Carl became Hereditary Prince of Leiningen. On 9 January 1807, he succeeded his father as second Prince of Leiningen.

=== Marriages and issue ===
Emich Carl was married firstly, on 1787, to Countess Henriette Sophie of Reuss-Ebersdorf (1767–1801), youngest daughter of Heinrich XXIV, Count of Reuss-Ebersdorf and his wife, Countess Karoline Ernestine of Erbach-Schönberg. Henriette died on 3 September 1801. Emich Carl and Henrietta had one son, who died young and within the lifetime of his mother, being:

- Prince Friedrich Karl Heinrich Ludwig of Leiningen (1 March 1793 – 22 February 1800)

On 21 December 1803, two years after the death of his first wife, Emich married Princess Victoria of Saxe-Coburg-Saalfeld, fourth daughter of Francis, Duke of Saxe-Coburg-Saalfeld by his wife, Countess Augusta Reuss of Ebersdorf. His second wife was a niece of his late wife. They had two further children:

- Carl Friedrich Wilhelm Emich (12 September 1804 – 13 November 1856); succeeded his father as third prince; married on 13 February 1829, Countess Maria von Klebelsberg-Thumburg (1806–1880), and had issue.
- Princess Anna Feodora Auguste Charlotte Wilhelmine of Leiningen (7 December 1807 – 23 September 1872); married in 1828, Ernst I, Prince of Hohenlohe-Langenburg, and had issue.

=== Death and succession ===
Emich Carl died at Amorbach on 1814, and was succeeded by their only surviving son, Carl Friedrich.

== Post-mortem connections ==
Four years after his death, his widow married Prince Edward, Duke of Kent and Strathearn, fourth son of King George III of the United Kingdom. They had a daughter, Princess Victoria of Kent, who would later become Queen regnant of the United Kingdom.

== Ancestry ==
Ancestors of Emich Carl, Prince of Leiningen

8. Johann Friedrich, Count of Leiningen-Dagsburg-Hardenburg
4. Friedrich Magnus, Count of Leiningen-Dagsburg-Hardenburg
9. Princess and Margravine Katharina of Baden-Durlach
2. Karl Friedrich Wilhelm, Prince of Leiningen
10. Count Johann Joseph Wilhelm of Wurmbrand-Stuppach (= 14)
5. Countess Anna Christine Eleonore of Wurmbrand-Stuppach
11. Baroness Susanna Josefa von Prösing-Stein
1. Emich Karl, Prince of Leiningen
12. Ludwig Heinrich, Count of Solms-Rödelheim-Assenheim
6. Wilhelm Karl Ludwig, Count of Solms-Rödelheim-Assenheim
13. Countess Wilhelmine Christiane of Limpurg-Gaildorf
3. Countess Christiane Wilhelmine of Solms-Rödelheim-Assenheim
14. Count Johann Joseph Wilhelm of Wurmbrand-Stuppach (= 10)
7. Countess Maria Margaret Leopoldina of Wurmbrand-Stuppach
15. Countess Juliana Dorothea of Limpurg-Gaildorf

== Sources ==
- Thomas Gehrlein: Das Haus Leiningen. 900 Jahre Gesamtgeschichte mit Stammfolgen. Deutsche Fürstenhäuser. Heft 32. Börde Verlag, Werl 2011, ISBN 978-3-9811993-9-0, S. 25
- https://www.rct.uk/collection/search#/3/collection/420728/emich-charles-prince-of-leiningen-1763-1814
- Marek, Miroslav. "leiningen/leiningen6.html#EC". Genealogy.EU.
- royal collection https://www.rct.uk/collection/search#/2/collection/420728/emich-charles-prince-of-leiningen-1763-1814

German nobility
Preceded by Carl Friedrich Wilhelm	Prince of Leiningen; 1807–1814	Succeeded by Carl Friedrich Wilhelm Emich
