= Princess Marie of Baden, Princess of Leiningen =

Princess Marie
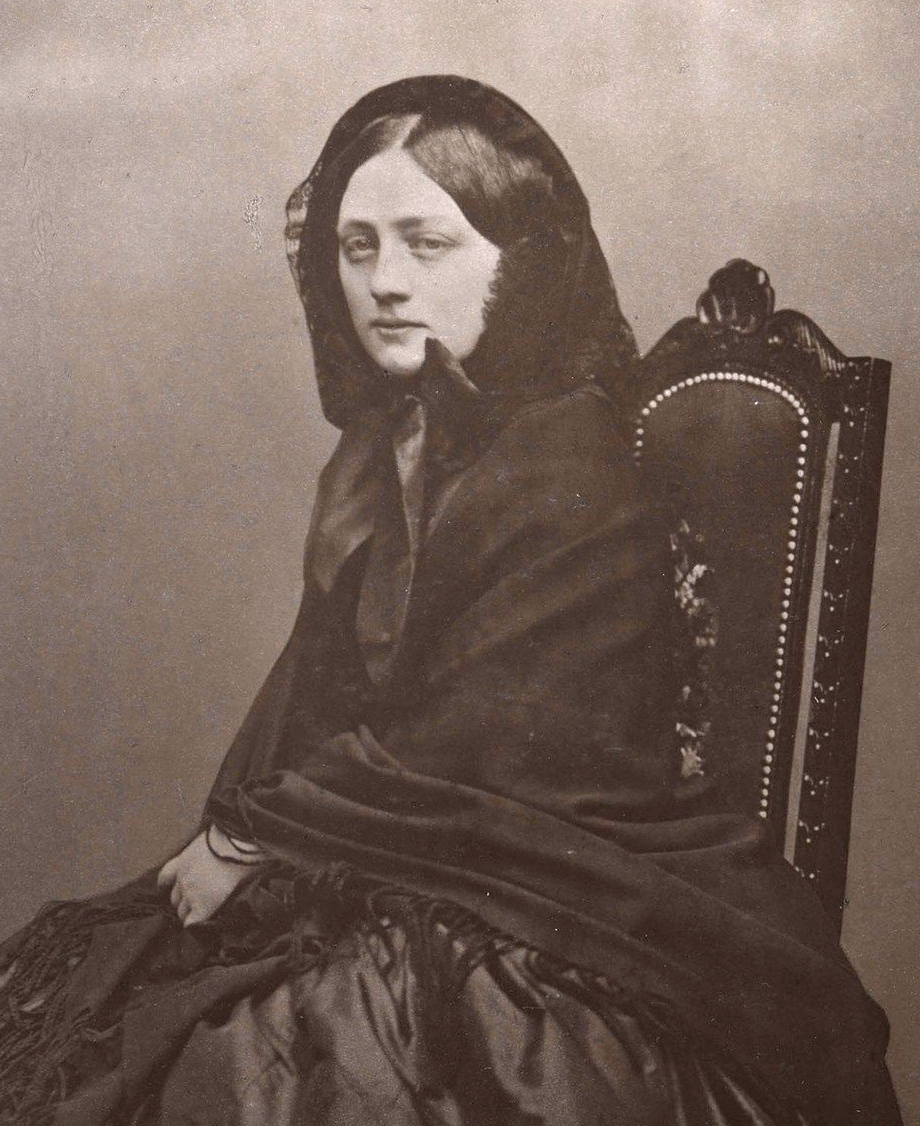
- Photograph, c. 1858–59

Princess of Leiningen
- Tenure: 11 September 1858 – 21 November 1899
- Born: 20 November 1834; Karlsruhe, Grand Duchy of Baden
- Died: 21 November 1899 (aged 65); Amorbach, Bavaria, German Empire
- Spouse: Ernst, 4th Prince of Leiningen (m. 1858)
- Issue: Princess Alberta; Emich, 5th Prince of Leiningen
Names
- Marie Amalie
- House: Zähringen
- Father: Leopold, Grand Duke of Baden
- Mother: Princess Sophie of Sweden

Princess Marie of Baden (Marie Amalie; 20 November 1834, in Karlsruhe – 21 November 1899, in Amorbach) was the third daughter and seventh child of Leopold, Grand Duke of Baden and his wife Princess Sophie of Sweden. She was Princess of Leiningen through her marriage with Ernst Leopold, 4th Prince of Leiningen.

== Family ==
Marie of Baden, Princess of Leiningen by William Corden.

Princess Marie was born on 20 November 1834, in Karlsruhe as Marie Amalie, Princess and Margravine of Baden. She was the third daughter and seventh child of Grand Duke Leopold of Baden and Princess Sophie Wilhelmine of Sweden.

Marie's father, Grand Duke Leopold, descended from a morganatic branch of the Baden family (his mother was Louise Caroline of Hochberg, a noblewoman) and thus did not have rights to a princely status or the sovereign rights of the House of Zähringen of Baden. However, in 1830 he ascended to the throne of the Grand Duchy of Baden after the main male line of his family died out. Leopold was considered the first German ruler who held in his country's liberal reforms. Her mother, Sophie Wilhelmine of Sweden, was a daughter of King Gustav IV Adolf of Sweden and Frederica of Baden.

== Marriage and issue ==
On 11 September 1858 in Karlsruhe Marie married Ernst Leopold, 4th Prince of Leiningen, the elder of two sons born to Carl, 3rd Prince of Leiningen, and Countess Marie von Klebelsberg. Prince Carl of Leiningen was the maternal half-brother of Queen Victoria of the United Kingdom. They had two children :

- Princess Alberta of Leiningen (23 July 1863 – 30 August 1901); never married. She was diagnosed with Bright's disease in 1875 and suffered chronic ill health until her death in 1901.
- Prince Emich of Leiningen (18 January 1866 – 18 July 1939); became 5th Prince of Leiningen on his father's death in 1904; married Princess Feodore of Hohenlohe-Langenburg (1866–1932).

Marie was said to have married to "get out of an unhappy home".

== Ancestry ==
Ancestors of Princess Marie of Baden, Princess of Leiningen

8. Frederick, Hereditary Prince of Baden-Durlach
4. Charles Frederick, Grand Duke of Baden
9. Princess Amalia of Nassau-Dietz
2. Leopold, Grand Duke of Baden
10. Ludwig Heinrich, Baron Geyer of Geyersberg
5. Baroness Louise Caroline Geyer of Geyersberg
11. Countess Maximiliana Christiane of Sponeck
1. Princess Marie of Baden
12. Gustav III of Sweden
6. Gustav IV Adolf of Sweden
13. Sophia Magdalena of Denmark
3. Princess Sophie of Sweden
14. Charles Louis, Hereditary Prince of Baden
7. Frederica of Baden
15. Landgravine Amalie of Hesse-Darmstadt
