= Wurmbrand-Stuppach =

Austrian noble family

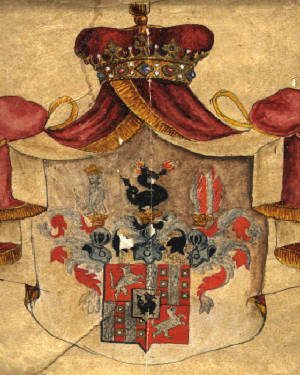
Coat of arms of Counts of Wurmbrand-Stuppach

The House of Wurmbrand-Stuppach is an old noble family of Austria. During the 17th and 18th centuries, the Counts of Wurmbrand-Stuppach gained notability in wars against the Turks in the Balkans. They were highly decorated advisors to the Habsburg Emperors. During the 18th century the family had immediate status as ruling counts of a small territory of the Holy Roman Empire and as such, the family belonged to high nobility.

== The Wurmbrand Saga ==
The founding of the house of Wurmbrand-Stuppach, and the origins of the name, occurred during the Crusades. The Count of Stuppach had disappeared seven years earlier fighting in the Holy Land, and the knights were getting impatient on waiting for his wife and successor to remarry. A lindworm (a mythological two-legged wyvern-like creature) had entered the county and began to terrorise the land. The knights demanded she marry a brave nobleman to fight it.

The Countess asked for four weeks' delay, and when that time had passed she said to the knights "I asked God. He likes my husband to return to me, if he still lives. To my sadness he did not come. Give me still four weeks period." But the people would not have another four weeks delay due to the lindworm, so she instead announced that she would marry whoever slayed the beast.

Silently, the knights left. Those which went to slay the lindworm did not return. One day, a poor farmer was on the Burglach making fences when the lindworm appeared. It lunged at the farmer, which speared the lindworm in the mouth with a stake he was using to build the fences. Other farmers who were nearby saw it, and they carried him to the countess to be married. The wedding lasted a week.

== History ==
Original Coat of arms of Wurmbrand family

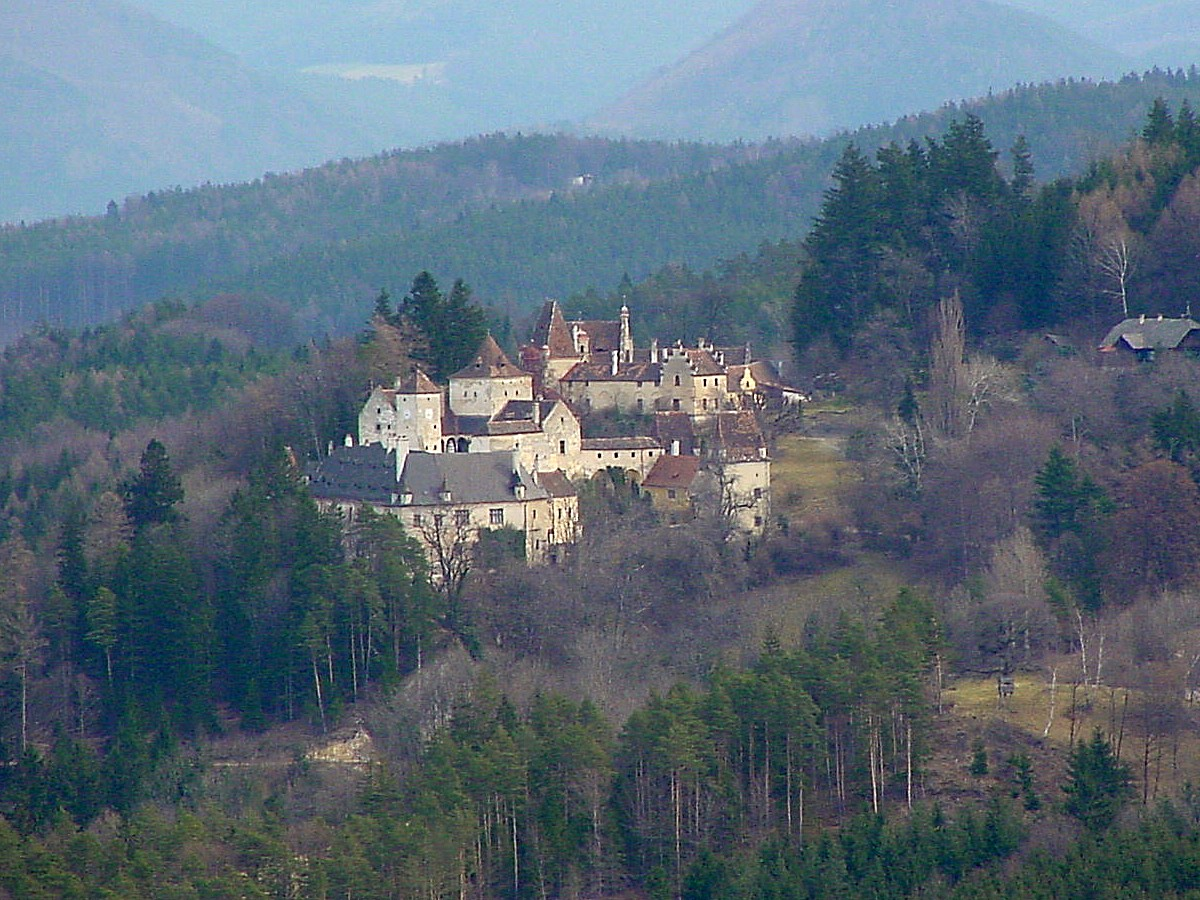
Steyersberg Castle, Lower Austria, Austria

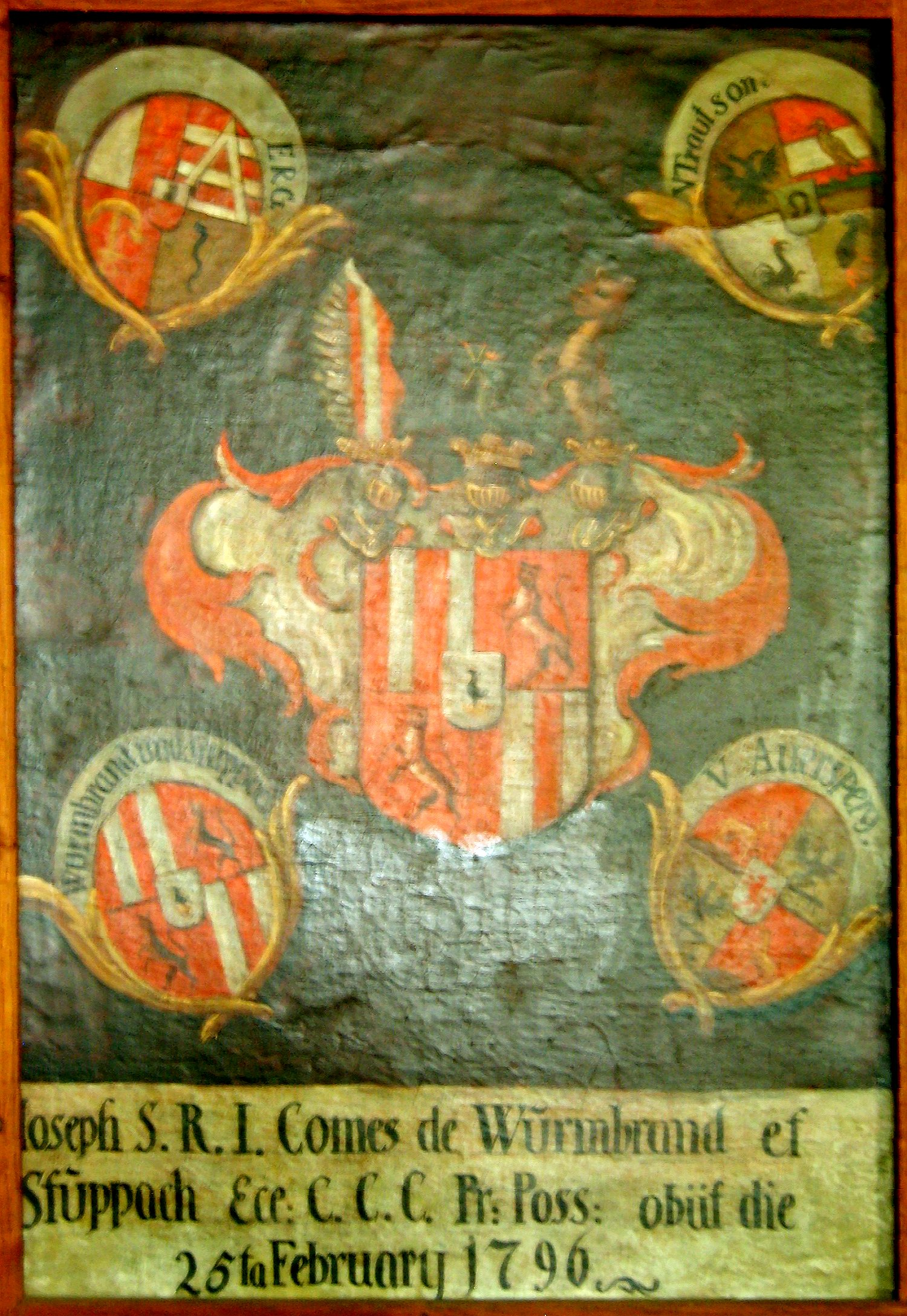
Coat of arms of Count Franz Joseph von Wurmbrand-Stuppach (1751-1803) in 1796

The family is first mentioned with Leupold dem Wurmbrant in 1194. They originate from the Bucklige Welt region in Lower Austria. At the end of the 12th century they received the fief of Stuppach castle near Gloggnitz which remained in their possession until 1659.

In 1600, they acquired Steyersberg castle near Warth, Lower Austria.

Ehrenreich the Elder (1558- c. 1620) became Baron in 1607. His children became Counts in 1682. Count Johann Josef Wilhelm (1670–1750), president of the Aulic Council, was honored by the Emperor by being made a personal (not yet hereditary) member of the Franconian count's bench, a part of the college of Imperial Princes (Reichsfürstenrat or Fürstenbank) in the Imperial Diet in 1726. Upon his admission he had to promise to purchase some immediate territory on the first occasion, since all of the family's possessions had no such status as they were located within the Archduchy of Austria. Finally a splinter share of the immediate County of Limpurg was inherited by Johann Josef Wilhelm's wife Countess Juliane Dorothea von Limpurg-Gaildorf (1677-1734), a territory around its residence Gaildorf, Swabia, that had been divided between a large number of heirs when its former rulers, the Counts Schenk von Limpurg extinguished in 1713, leaving ten daughters. With this splinter share, the acquisition of a territory with Imperial Immediacy was fulfilled and the head of the family became a hereditary member of the Swabian count's bench. The county of Limpurg was mediatized in 1806 and became part of the Kingdom of Württemberg. The Mediatized Houses however kept their princely status.

The elder branch extinguished with count Degenhard in 1965, and his only daughter, Countess Leonora Huberta Maria (b. 1927) inherited Steyersberg castle; it is now owned by her son Dr Paul Miller. The headship of the house went to count Ernst Gundaccar (b. 1946) of the younger branch, formerly residing at Liblín (Czech Republic). His mother, the heiress of Schloss Frohsdorf, was Princess Bianca Massimo (1906-1999), youngest daughter of Prince Fabrizio Massimo (1868-1944) and his wife, Princess Beatrice of Bourbon (1874-1961), herself a daughter of Carlos, Duke of Madrid. Frohsdorf castle was sold in 1941, but the estate is still owned by count Ernst Gundaccar who has two sons. Schloss Stubenberg in Styria was bought in 1815 and given to the Catholic Church in 1925 as a monastery, when two daughters took the veil.

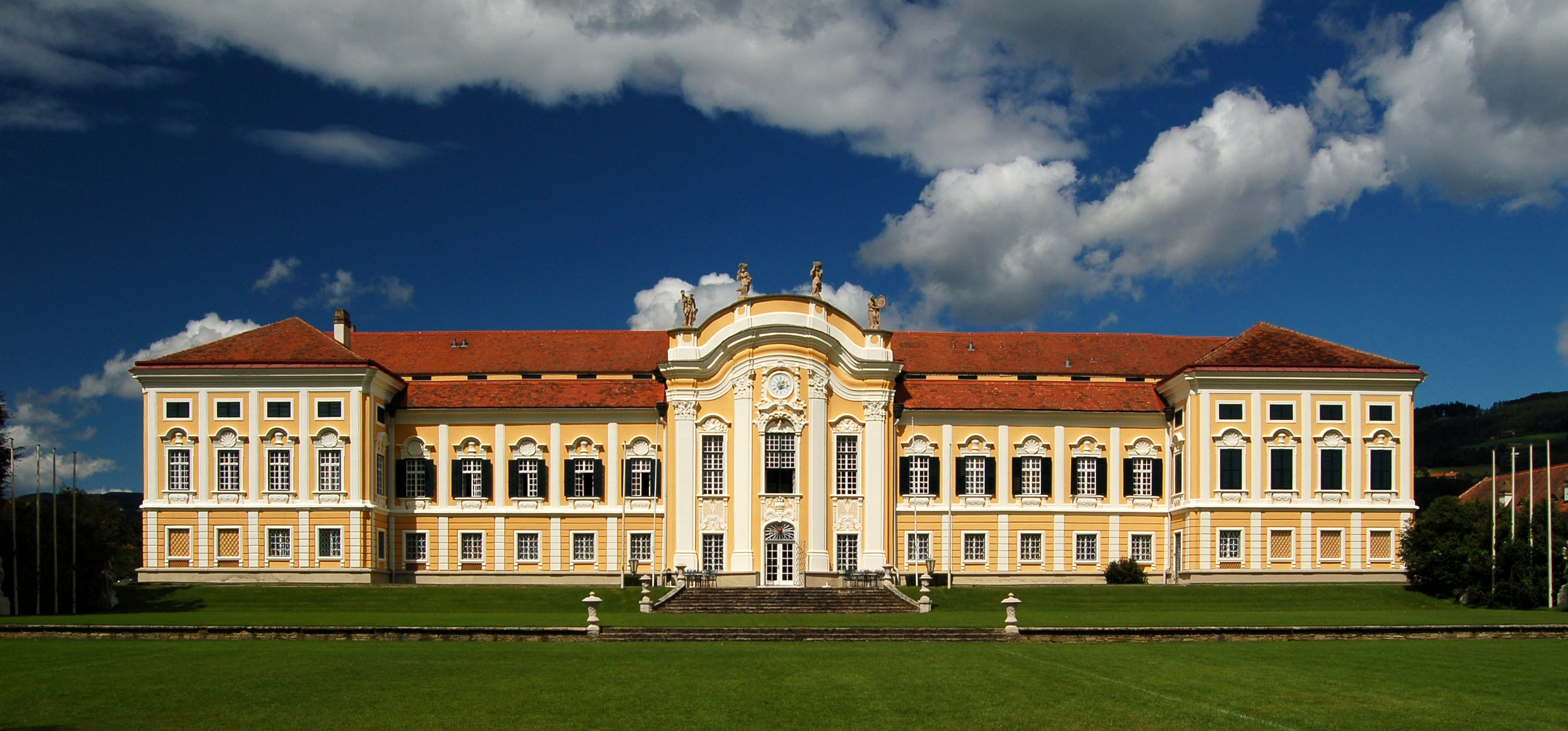
Schielleiten Palace

The third branch resided at Reitenau castle near Stambach (1602-1822) and at Gornja Radgona Castle (1789-1914). In 1694 they purchased Altschielleiten castle at Stubenberg, Styria, where the new Schielleiten Palace was built from 1730. When this branch extinguished in 1906, the palace was inherited by the Marchese Tacoli family. They owned the palace until 1921, when the new owner became Frank Whitehead (1889-1950) from Fiume, elder brother of Agathe Whitehead, first wife of Georg Ludwig von Trapp, progenitor of the Trapp family. He possessed the castle until 1935, when in was bought by the Austrian Republic.

== Rulers of the House of Wurmbrand-Stuppach in a part of the County of Limpurg (1682) ==
- Graf Johann Eustach von Wurmbrand-Stuppach (1682-1687)
- Graf Johann Joseph Wilhelm von Wurmbrand-Stuppach (1687–1750)
- Graf Gundakar Thomas von Wurmbrand-Stuppach (1750–1791)
- Graf Gundakar Heinrich von Wurmbrand-Stuppach (1791–1806)

== Heads of the mediatised house ==
In 1806 the count of Wurmbrand-Stuppach was mediatised.

- Gundaccar, 4th Count 1791-1847 (1791–1847)
  - Ernst Heinrich Gundaccar Kaspar Gregor Johann Nepomuk, Hereditary Count of Wurmbrand-Stuppach (1804-1846)
    - Ferdinand Gundaccar, 5th Count 1847-1896 (1835–1896)
      - Wilhelm, 6th Count 1896-1927 (1862–1927)
        - Degenhart, 7th Count 1927-1965 (1893–1965)
          - Countess Leonora (1927-2009)
  - Count Wilhelm (1806-1884)
    - Count Paul (1853-1927)
      - Count Paul (1891-1962)
        - Ernst Gundaccar, 8th Count 1965–present (b.1946)
          - Count Helmwig Paul Ernst (b.1970)
          - Count Gundaccar Ernst Robert (b.1977)
            - Countess Valentina (b.2016)

== Notable members of the house ==
Count John Joseph William (1670–1750)
After studying at the University of Utrecht, John William was appointed an advisor in 1697. He reorganised the royal advisory, and was responsible for much genealogical work in Austria (Collectanea genealogico historica, ex archivo inclytorum Austriae Inferioris statuum, ut et aliis privatis documentisque originalibus excerpta). His work first appeared in Vienna in 1705, and it earned him the name "the Father of Austrian Genealogy". Later, Count John William reorganised the archives of Lower Austria, and established a system which continued even after a new repertory of nobility. In 1726, he gained a seat and voice in the Franconian Diet in Rothenburg. When the Wittelsbach King Charles Albert of Bavaria gained the Imperial crown in 1742, Count John William retired from service in Bohemia, and only emerged from retirement following Charles's death in 1745 and the restoration of the Habsburgs to the Imperial throne. Count John William died in 1750 and was buried in Vienna. He was married five times; only his third wife, Maria Domininca Gräfin von Starhemberg, mothered a son and heir, Count Gundacker Thomas.

Count Christian Siegmund
He became the treasurer of King Frederick Augustus of Poland and Saxony. In 1704, he entered the service of the Austrian Habsburgs, and fought in the War of the Spanish Succession. Captured and imprisoned in Ettlingen in 1707, he gained special favour with Prince Eugene and fought the Turks for the Austrians. In 1716, he fought in the siege of Temesvar (Timișoara) with Prince Eugene, and with the cities' fall that year he delivered the tidings of success to Vienna. During the War of the Polish Succession he already had the rank of a Field Marshal Lieutenant, and he was an Interim Commandant of the Imperial Army in 1734 in the defence of Grevenberg against the French led by Bellisle. In 1735, he was put in charge of the Imperial Cavalry. Christian Siegmund died without heirs in 1737, and in his will had his extensive fortune returned to Steyersberg.

Count Casimir Henry
Casimir Henry was the brother of Christian Siegmund. During the War of the Austrian Succession, he was a cavalry general and served under Khevenhüller. In 1741, he was promoted to a tactical advisor. In 1745, he was the governor of Ath an der Dender in the Netherlands, and vigorously defended it. He died heirless in 1749.
