= Visoka Mogila =

Visoka Mogila Висока могила
- Village
- Location within Bulgaria
- Coordinates: 42°11′N 23°1′E
- Country: Bulgaria
- Province: Kyustendil Province
- Municipality: Boboshevo

Area
  - Total: 6.363 km^{2} (2.457 sq mi)
- Elevation: 638 m (2,093 ft)

Population (2013)
  - Total: 43
- Time zone: UTC+2 (EET)
  - Summer (DST): UTC+3 (EEST)
- Postal Code: 2665

Visoka Mogila (Bulgarian: Висока могила) is a village in Boboshevo Municipality, Kyustendil Province, south-western Bulgaria. As of 2013 it has 43 inhabitants.

== Geography ==
It is situated 83 km south of the capital, Sofia, 20 km southwest of its former administrative (district) center—the town of Dupnitsa—and only 7 km northeast of the current municipal center—the town of Boboshevo. The village lies near the Struma Motorway, less than 2 km to the west. The territory of Visoka Mogila borders the villages of Kamenik (to the north), Blazhievo (to the northeast), Usoyka (to the east), Sopovo (to the south), and Tsiklovo (to the west), as well as the town of Boboshevo (to the southwest). Visoka Mogila belongs to the historical-geographical region known as Gorno Pole. It is located on the southeastern slope of Pogled Mountain (part of the southern section of the Konyavska Mountain range) at an altitude of 638 meters. The terrain within the village's territory is almost entirely semi-mountainous. The village is surrounded on all sides by hills covered with diverse vegetation, ranging from grasses and shrubs to various tree species (such as oak, Turkish oak, ash, and pine). The settlement has limited water resources. The local climate and soil conditions are favorable for the cultivation of fruit crops and vineyards—activities that were well-developed in the past.
