= Dyakovo =

Dyakovo is a Slavic placename. Places with the name include:

- Dyakovo, Bulgaria
- Dyakovo, Gryazovetsky District, Vologda Oblast
- Dyakovo, Sokolsky District, Vologda Oblast
- Dyakovo, Vologodsky District, Vologda Oblast

== See also ==
- Nevetlenfolu, formerly Dyakove
