= Tsiklovo =

Tsiklovo Циклово
- Village
- Location within Bulgaria
- Coordinates: 42°12′22.32″N 22°59′39.58″E
- Country: Bulgaria
- Province: Kyustendil Province
- Municipality: Boboshevo

Area
  - Total: 4.319 km^{2} (1.668 sq mi)
- Elevation: 715 m (2,346 ft)

Population (2013)
  - Total: 2
- Time zone: UTC+2 (EET)
  - Summer (DST): UTC+3 (EEST)
- Postal Code: 2666

Tsiklovo (Bulgarian: Циклово) is a village in Boboshevo Municipality, Kyustendil Province, south-western Bulgaria. As of 2013 it has only two inhabitants.

== Location ==
The village of Tsiklovo is located in a mountainous region. It is situated in a small basin and surrounded by a pine forest. This small village lies 5–6 km from the village of Visoka Mogila, which is located near the town of Boboshevo. There are several roads leading to the village; one of them—which is now hardly ever used—passes through the village of Kamenik.
