= Dobrovo, Bulgaria =

Dobrovo Доброво
- Village
- Location within Bulgaria
- Coordinates: 42.1667°N 22.9833°E
- Country: Bulgaria
- Province: Kyustendil Province
- Municipality: Boboshevo
- Time zone: UTC+2 (EET)
  - Summer (DST): UTC+3 (EEST)

Dobrovo is a village in Boboshevo Municipality, Kyustendil Province, south-western Bulgaria.

== History ==
There is a belief that the village was named by St. Ivan of Rila in recognition of the kindness shown to him by the local people. They helped him escape and hide when the villagers from his birthplace, Skrino, attempted to stone him to death.
