= Dzherman (river) =

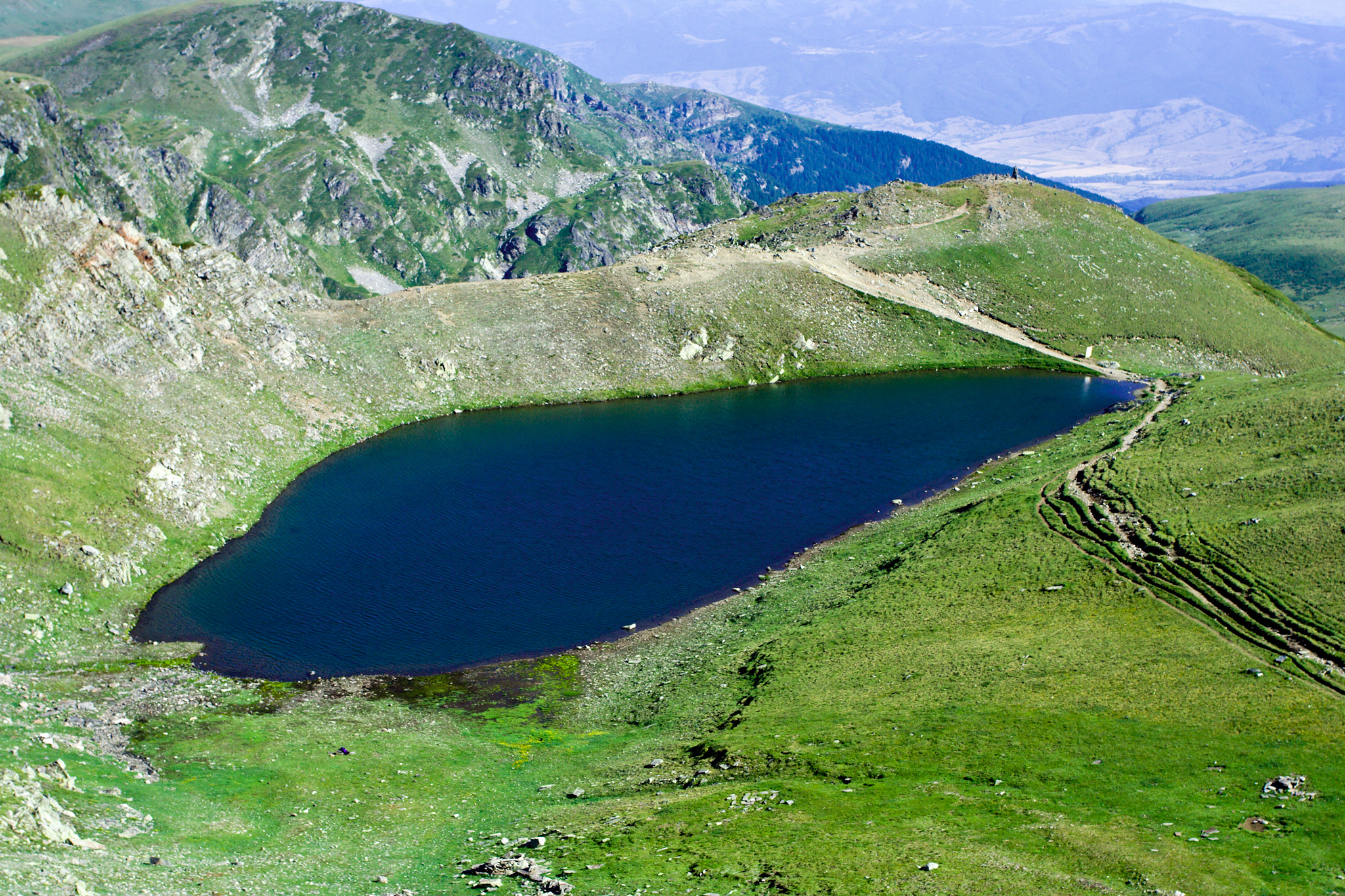
- The Tear Lake, the source of Dzherman

Location
- Country: Bulgaria

Physical characteristics
- Source
  - location: Seven Rila Lakes, Rila
  - elevation: 2,535 m (8,317 ft)
- Mouth
  - location: Struma River
  - coordinates: 42°8′52.88″N 23°1′21″E
  - elevation: 369 m (1,211 ft)
- Length: 47.8 km (29.7 mi)
- Basin size: 767 km^{2} (296 sq mi)

Basin features
- Progression: Struma→ Aegean Sea

The Dzherman (Bulgarian: Джерман) is a river in south-western Bulgaria, a left tributary of the Struma, flowing through the municipalities of Sapareva Banya, Dupnitsa and Boboshevo in Kyustendil Province. The river is 47.8 km long and drains the northwestern sections of the Rila mountain range.

== Name ==
The name of the river is a modification of the name of the ancient Thracian settlement of Germa, founded near the hot mineral springs on the left bank of the river at modern Sapareva Banya. During the Roman rule the settlement was transformed into the fortified city of Germanea. The river is mentioned with name Germanshitsa in the 1378 Rila Charter of the Bulgarian emperor Ivan Shishman (r. 1371–1395), which was later modified to Dzherman during the Ottoman rule.

== Geography ==
The Dzherman takes its source from the Tear Lake, the highest one of the Seven Rila Lakes group in the western part of Rila at an altitude of 2,535 m. It then flows through the Twin Lake and the Trefoil Lake before continuing in northeastern direction, where it is joined by a stream flowing from the two lowermost lakes of the group, the Fish and the Lower Lakes.

Within Rila, the river flows in a heavily forested deep glacial valley with a number of rapids and waterfalls. Initially the Dzherman flows in northeastern direction and at 1.3 km northwest of the Vada refuge, it makes a sharp turn to the northwest. It enters the Dupnitsa Valley near the town of Sapareva Banya, where it turns to the west and its valley becomes wide and relatively shallow. After the town of Dupnitsa, the Dzherman, fed by its numerous tributaries mainly from the northwestern slopes of Rila, becomes larger, turns to the south-southwest and its valley widens significantly. It then flows into the Struma, at an altitude of 369 m, about 1 km east of the town of Boboshevo.

Its catchment area covers a territory of 392 km², or represents 4.43% of Struma's total. It borders the basins of the rivers Leva and Arkata, left tributaries of the Struma, to the west and north; the basin of the Rilska River, a left tributary of the Struma, to the south; and basin of the Iskar from the Danube drainage to the northeast and east. Its tributaries include Skakavitsa, Goritsa, Dupnishka Bistritsa, etc. The highest waterfalls in Rila are situated in the Dzherman catchment area — Skakavitsa (70 m) and Goritsa (39 m).

The Dzherman has predominantly snow-rain feed with high water in late spring and early summer (May–June) and low water in summer (July–September). The average annual flow is 3.35 m^{3}/s at Dupnitsa.

== Settlements and transport ==
There are four settlements along the river — the towns of Sapareva Banya and Dupnitsa and the villages Dzherman and Usoyka. Its waters are used for irrigation in the Dupnitsa Valley. Two roads of the national network follow the river valley — a 15 km section of the first class I-1 road between Dupnitsa and Slatino and second class road II-62 from Dupnitsa to the junction for the village of Kraynitsi. A section of the railway between Sofia and Kulata follows the left banks of the river between Dupnitsa and Boboshevo.
