= Piperovo =

Piperovo may refer to:

- Piperovo, Kyustendil Province, Bulgaria
- Piperovo, North Macedonia
