= Hermann Leiningen =

Canadian banker and German prince (born 1963)

- Born: Hermann Friedrich Fernando Roland Prinz zu Leiningen; April 16, 1963 (age 62); Toronto, Ontario, Canada
- Spouse: Deborah Cully (m. 1987)
- Children: 3
- Parents: Prince Karl of Leiningen (father); Princess Marie Louise of Bulgaria (mother)

Prince Hermann Friedrich Fernando Roland of Leiningen (German: Hermann Friedrich Fernando Roland Prinz zu Leiningen; born April 16, 1963) is a Canadian banker and the younger son of Prince Karl of Leiningen and Princess Marie Louise of Bulgaria.

== Life ==
Leiningen was born in Toronto, Ontario. Through his mother, Leiningen is a grandson of King Boris III of Bulgaria, a great-grandson of King Victor Emmanuel III of Italy and great-great-grandson of King Nicholas of Montenegro. Through his father, he is a great-great-great-grandson of both Queen Victoria and Alexander II of Russia.

Leiningen is a financial analyst and banker, addressed as Mr. Hermann Leiningen professionally. As of 2015, Leiningen worked for a division of Royal Bank of Canada.

On 16 May 1987, Leiningen married Deborah Cully (born December 2, 1961). They have three daughters.

He actively participates in a number of Bulgarian initiatives, in events dedicated to the role of King Boris and the Bulgarian people in saving the Bulgarian Jews during the Holocaust. Prince Herman is an honorary member of the Board of Trustees of the H.C.V. Princess Marie Louise and of the King Boris and Queen Giovanna Fund who manages Vrana Palace in Sofia.

== Ancestry ==
Ancestors of Hermann Leiningen

8. Emich, 5th Prince of Leiningen
4. Karl, 6th Prince of Leiningen
9. Princess Feodore of Hohenlohe-Langenburg
2. Prince Karl of Leiningen
10. Cyril Vladimirovich, Grand Duke of Russia
5. Grand Duchess Maria Kirillovna of Russia
11. Princess Victoria Melita of Saxe-Coburg and Gotha
1. Prince Hermann Friedrich of Leiningen
12. Ferdinand I of Bulgaria
6. Boris III of Bulgaria
13. Marie Louise of Bourbon-Parma
3. Princess Marie Louise of Bulgaria
14. Victor Emmanuel III of Italy
7. Giovanna of Italy
15. Elena of Montenegro
