= Ruen Monastery =

Bulgarian Orthodox monastery

Coordinates: 42°10′34″N 22°56′54″E

The Ruen Monastery St John of Rila (Bulgarian: Руенски манастир Свети Иван Рилски) is a Bulgarian Eastern Orthodox monastery part of the Dupnitsa vicarage of the Sofia eparchy of the Bulgarian Orthodox Church. It is situated near the village of Skrino, municipality of Boboshevo, Kyustendil Province.

== Location, history, architectural and artistic features ==
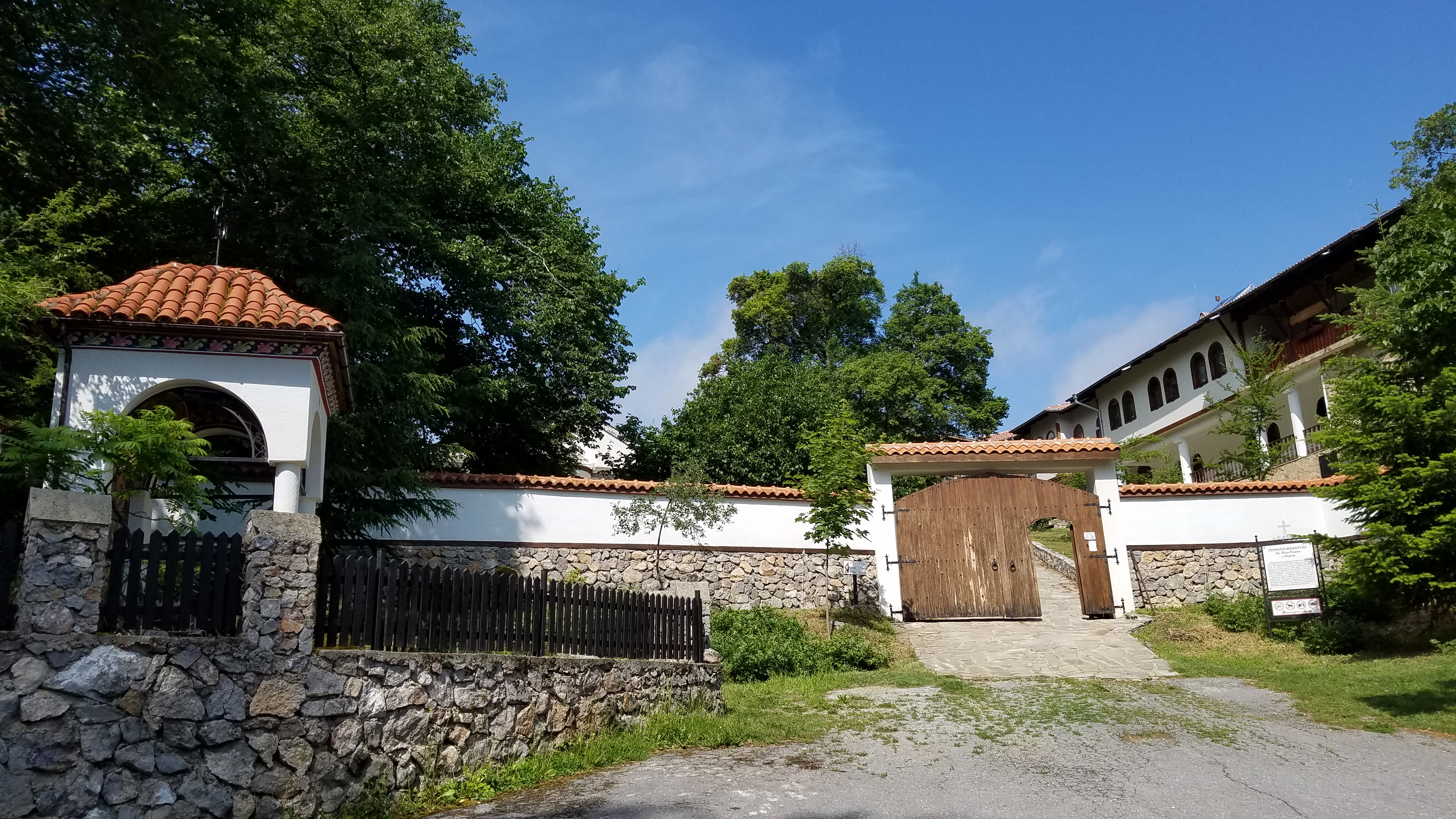

The monastery is situated in a beautiful countryside near the small town of Boboshevo at around 8 km to the west of the European route E79 between Sofia and Kulata, at 2,5 km to the north of the village of Skrino – the birthplace of John of Rila. The monastery was restored over the ruins of the old church in 1999. A path from the monastery leads to the cave where Saint John of Rila first began with his hermitage.

The monastery was named after the most famous Bulgarian saint, John of Rila (876-946), patron of the Bulgarian people and founder of the Rila Monastery – the largest stauropegic monastery in Bulgaria. He lived during the reign of Boris I, Simeon I and Peter I during the First Bulgarian Empire.

The day of the saint is celebrated on 19 October.
