= Badino =

Badino Бадино
- Village
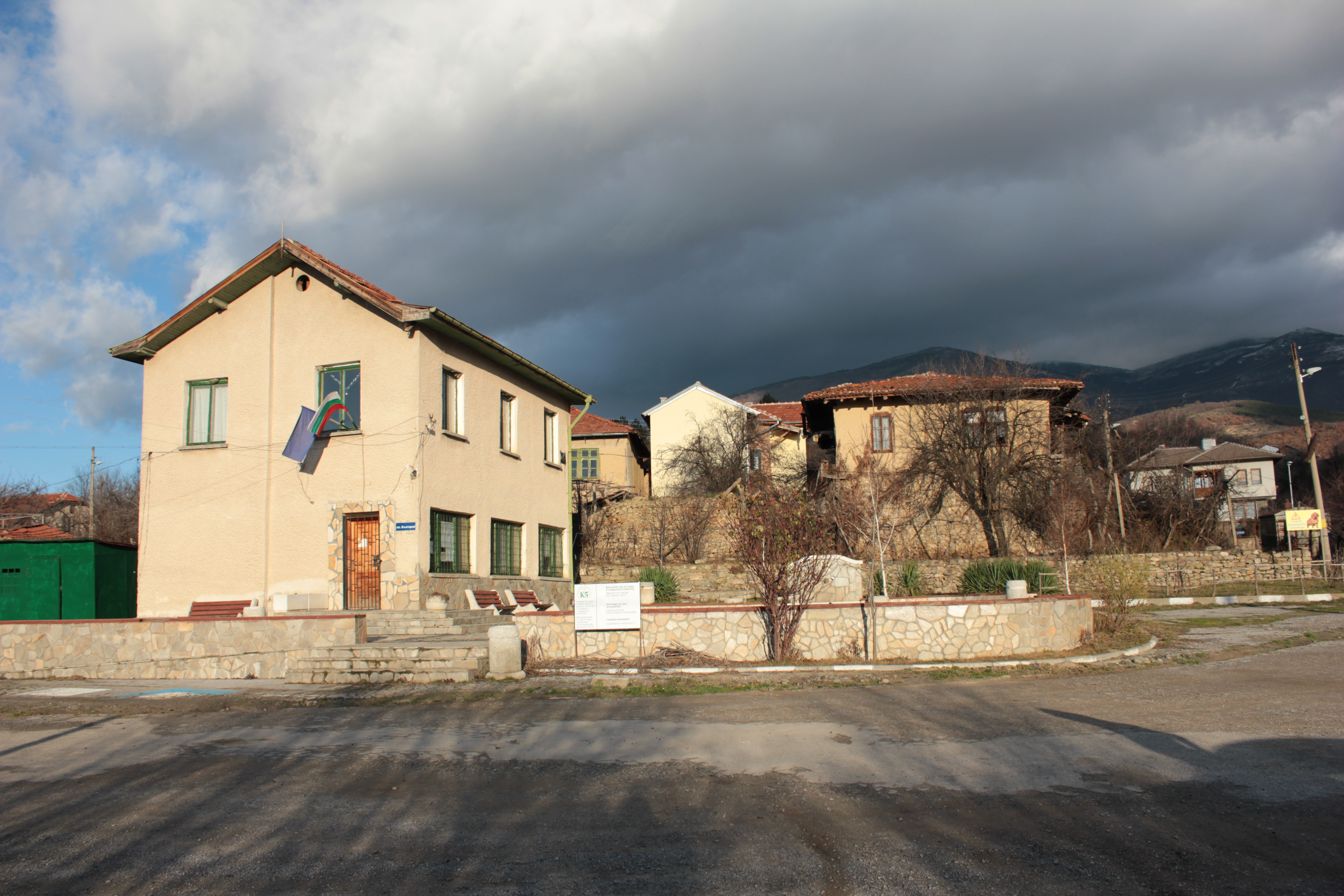
- Village's centre

- Location within Bulgaria
- Coordinates: 42.1667°N 23.1000°E
- Country: Bulgaria
- Province: Kyustendil Province
- Municipality: Boboshevo
- Time zone: UTC+2 (EET)
  - Summer (DST): UTC+3 (EEST)

Badino is a village in Boboshevo Municipality, Kyustendil Province, south-western Bulgaria.

The village of Badino is one of the smaller villages in Bulgaria. It is located in southwestern Bulgaria, approximately 20 km from the town of Dupnitsa and 60 km from the city of Sofia. The village features a spacious center and offers a panoramic view of the mountains; with its clean air, it serves as a destination for relaxation.

== Geography ==
Located at the foothills of the Rila Mountains, the village is laid out in the shape of a cross. It was founded about 800 years ago. In 1378, Ivan Shishman, via the Rila Charter, granted the village to the Rila Monastery as a feudal possession—a status it held until Bulgaria fell under Ottoman rule in 1396. Local legend suggests that the Tsar’s golden treasure lies buried in Badino. According to local resident Panayot Panayotov, speaking to the newspaper Treta Vazrast ("Third Age"), treasure hunters continue to dig around the village and its chapels, though no treasure has ever been found. A local couple, Yane and Stefana Badinski, donated 13 kilograms of gold coins and 6 kilograms of silver coins to help restore the Rila Monastery following a fire on January 13, 1833. A chapel dedicated to Yane and Stefana was subsequently built within the monastery’s main church. Construction of the Church of Saint Demetrius began in 1881; its specific location is at the very center of the cross-shaped village. The church is a two-story, three-aisled wooden structure, featuring a balcony for the church choir. Later, a refectory was built against its outer western wall, where students were provided with free midday meals, while the school building is located next to the church.
