= Slatino, Kyustendil Province =

Slatino Слатино
- Village
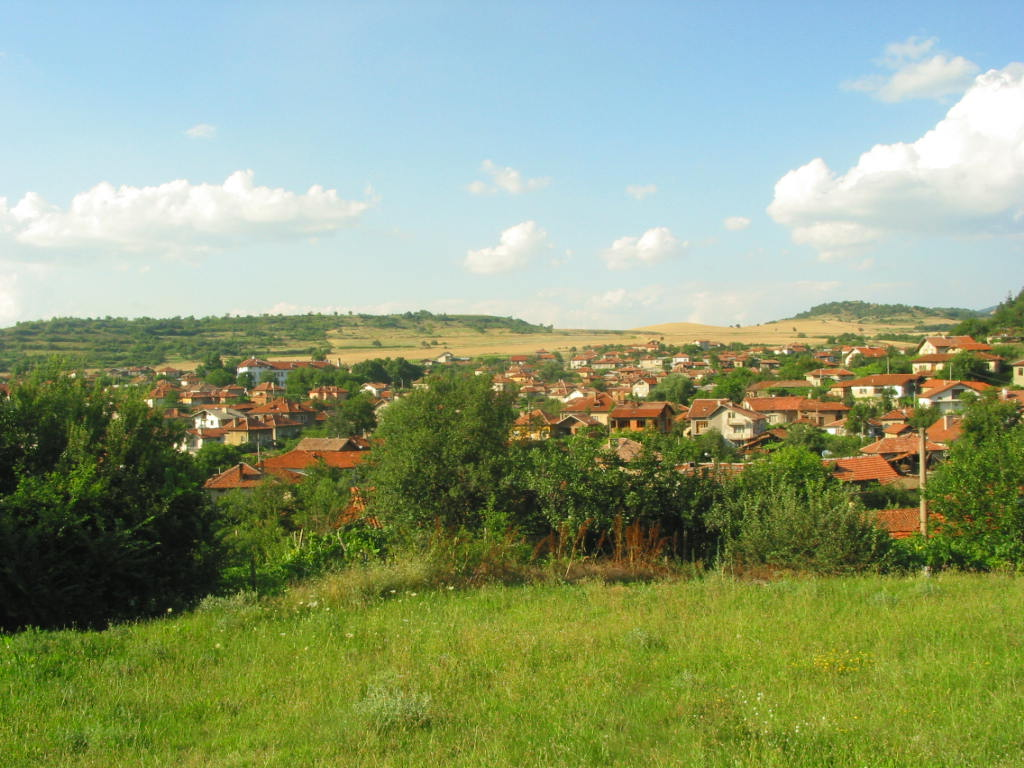

- Location within Bulgaria
- Coordinates: 42°10′N 23°3′E
- Country: Bulgaria
- Province: Kyustendil Province
- Municipality: Boboshevo

Area
  - Total: 12.273 km^{2} (4.739 sq mi)
- Elevation: 430 m (1,410 ft)

Population (2013)
  - Total: 417
- Time zone: UTC+2 (EET)
  - Summer (DST): UTC+3 (EEST)
- Postal Code: 2642

Slatino (Bulgarian: Слатино) is a village in Boboshevo Municipality, Kyustendil Province, south-western Bulgaria. As of 2013 it has 417 inhabitants. The villages is situated in the valley of the river Dzherman near the western foothills of the Rila mountain range.

The Slatino furnace model, an ancient ceramic artefact, was excavated at an archeological site near Slatino in the remains of a dwelling dated from the Eneolithic period (ca. 5000 BCE). In the Middle Ages the village was part of the Bulgarian Empire. In the 14th century Rila Charter of Emperor Ivan Shishman (r. 1371–1395) the surrounding lands were listed as a possession of the Rila Monastery.

== Gallery ==
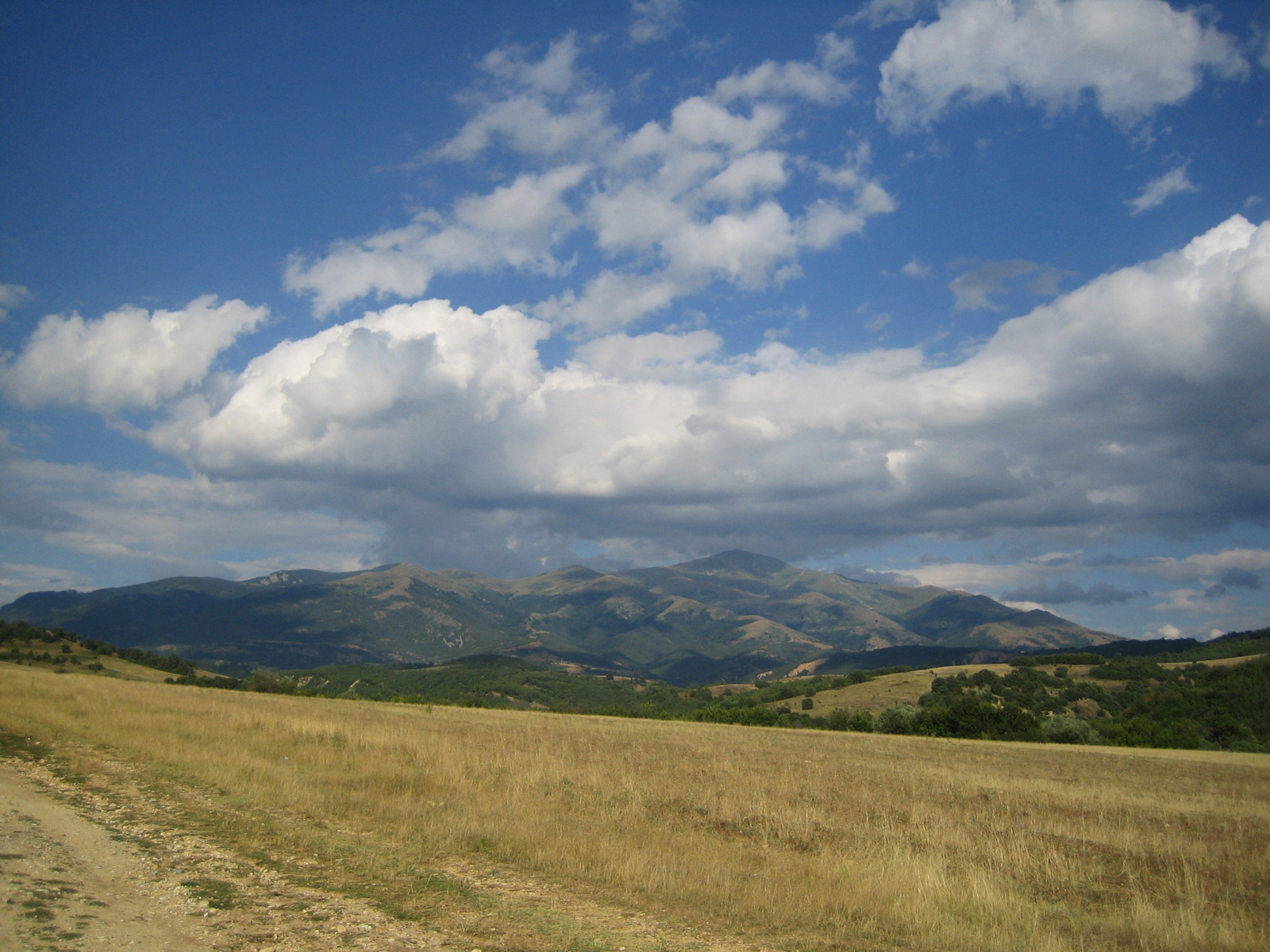
A view to Rila from Slatino

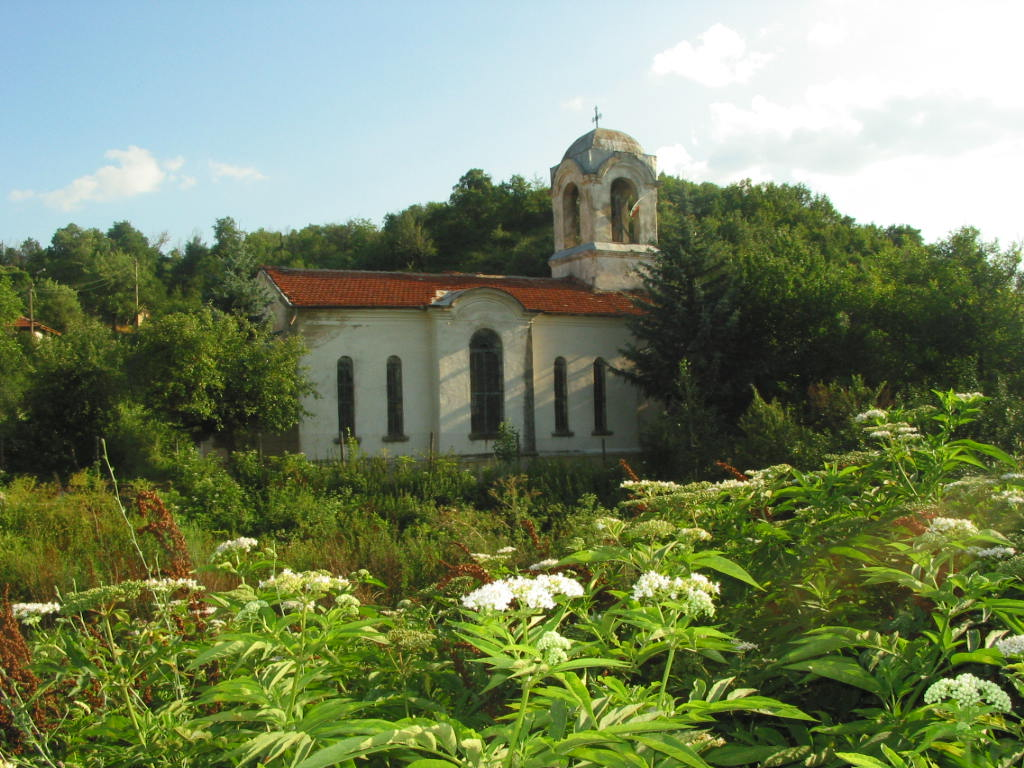
The church

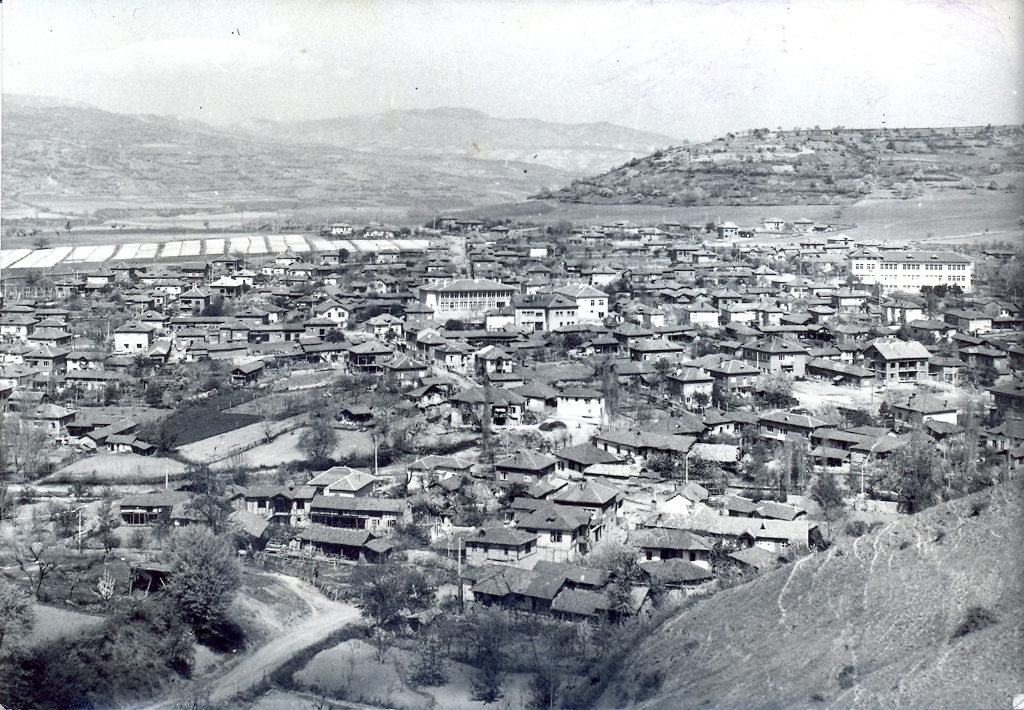
A view of the village in 1984
