= Blazhievo =

Blazhievo Блажиево
- Village
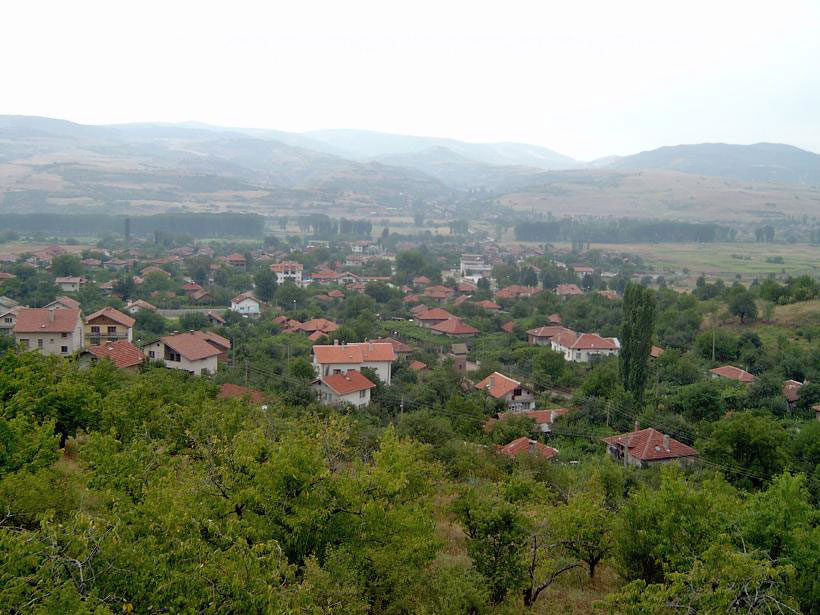
- View of Blazhievo village from the top

- Location within Bulgaria
- Coordinates: 42.2000°N 23.0500°E
- Country: Bulgaria
- Province: Kyustendil Province
- Municipality: Boboshevo
- Time zone: UTC+2 (EET)
  - Summer (DST): UTC+3 (EEST)

Blazhievo (Bulgarian: Блажиево) is a village in Boboshevo Municipality, Kyustendil Province, south-western Bulgaria.

== Geography ==
The village of Blazhievo is a small village located at the foot of the Rila Mountains. It is situated 6 km from the town of Dupnitsa. The Vernitsa River flows through it and empties into the Dzherman River.
