= Grand Duchess Maria Kirillovna of Russia =

Princess of Leiningen (1907–1951)

Maria Kirillovna
- Princess of Leiningen
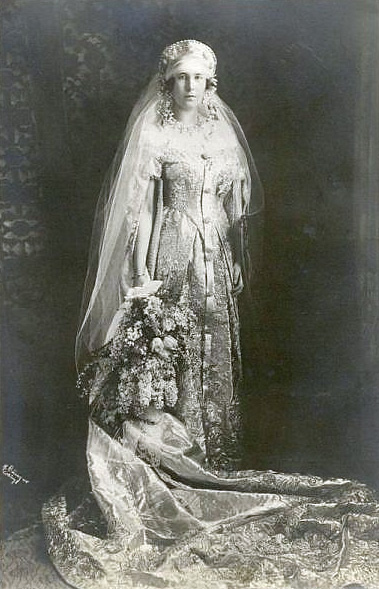
- Maria, circa 1925
- Born: 2 February 1907; Coburg, Duchy of Saxe-Coburg and Gotha, German Empire
- Died: 25 October 1951 (aged 44); Madrid, Spain
- Spouse: Karl, Prince of Leiningen (m. 1925; died 1946)
- Issue Detail: Emich Kyrill, Prince of Leiningen; Prince Karl; Kira, Princess Andrew of Yugoslavia; Margarita, Princess of Hohenzollern; Princess Mechtilde, Mrs. Bauscher; Prince Friedrich Wilhelm; Prince Peter
Names
- Maria Kirillovna Romanova
- House: Holstein-Gottorp-Romanov
- Father: Grand Duke Kirill Vladimirovich of Russia
- Mother: Princess Victoria Melita of Saxe-Coburg and Gotha

Princess Maria Kirillovna of Russia (2 February 1907 – 25 October 1951) was the eldest daughter of Grand Duke Kirill Vladimirovich of Russia and Princess Victoria Melita of Edinburgh. She was born in Coburg when her parents were in exile because their marriage had not been approved by Tsar Nicholas II. She was generally called "Marie," the French version of her name, or by the Russian nickname "Masha". The family returned to Russia prior to World War I, but was forced to flee following the Russian Revolution of 1917.

== Biography ==
=== Early life ===
Maria was raised in Coburg and in Saint-Briac, France. She was born Princess Maria Kirillovna Kirillovskaya with the style of Serene Highness, when her parents marriage was recognised by emperor Nicholas II she became Princess of the Imperial Blood Maria Kirillovna with the style of Highness but her father granted her the title Grand Duchess of Russia with the style Imperial Highness when he declared himself Curator of the Throne in 1921. As a child, the dark-haired, dark-eyed Maria took after her maternal grandmother, Grand Duchess Maria Alexandrovna of Russia, in appearance, with a wide, round face and a tendency to be overweight and to look older than her actual age when she was still a teenager.

She was described as "shy and easy-going", but also had her share of mishaps. In 1922, when she was fifteen, the "flighty" Maria visited her aunt, Queen Marie of Romania, and carried on a flirtation with the son-in-law of a lady-in-waiting at the Romanian court. Her thirteen-year-old cousin, Princess Ileana of Romania, spread rumors about the flirtation when Maria returned home, resulting in strained relations between Marie of Romania and Maria's mother, Victoria. The conflict was eventually smoothed over.

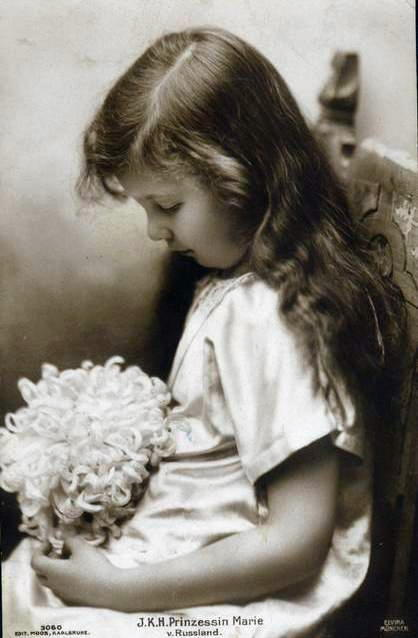
Grand Duchess Maria Kirillovna as a young girl.

=== Marriage and issue ===
On 24 February 1925, Maria was engaged to Karl, 6th Prince of Leiningen (13 February 1898 – 2 August 1946), and they were married on 25 November. They were third cousins, as Karl's great-grandfather Carl, was the half-brother of Maria's great-grandmother, Queen Victoria.

Victoria was at her daughter's bedside when she gave birth to her first child, Emich Kirill, in 1926. She also attended the subsequent births of Maria's children. Maria had seven children in all, one of whom died in infancy during World War II. Her husband was forced to join the German army and was taken captive by the Soviets at the end of World War II. He died of starvation in a Russian concentration camp in 1946. Maria, left with little money, struggled to support her surviving six children. She died five years later of a heart attack at the age of 44.

Karl and Maria had seven children:

- Emich Kyrill, Prince of Leiningen (18 October 1926 – 30 October 1991) married Duchess Eilika of Oldenburg (second of the three daughters of Nicolas Frederick William, Hereditary Grand Duke of Oldenburg) on 10 August 1950. They had four children and six grandchildren.
- Prince Karl of Leiningen (2 January 1928 – 28 September 1990) married Princess Marie Louise of Bulgaria on 14 February 1957 and they were divorced on 4 December 1968. They had two sons and five grandchildren.
- Princess Kira of Leiningen (18 July 1930 – 24 September 2005) married Prince Andrew of Yugoslavia on 18 September 1963 and they were divorced on 10 July 1972. They had three children and four grandchildren.
- Princess Margarita of Leiningen (9 May 1932 – 16 June 1996) married Frederick William, Prince of Hohenzollern on 5 January 1951. They had three sons (including Karl Friedrich von Hohenzollern) and nine grandchildren.
- Princess Mechtilde of Leiningen (2 January 1936 – 12 February 2021) married Karl Bauscher on 25 November 1961. They had three sons and three grandchildren.
- Prince Friedrich Wilhelm Berthold of Leiningen (18 June 1938 – 29 August 1998) married Karin Göss on 9 July 1960 and they were divorced in 1962. He remarried Helga Eschenbacher on 23 August 1971.
- Prince Peter Viktor of Leiningen (23 December 1942 – 12 January 1943)
