= Krayni Dol =

Krayni Dol Крайни дол
- Village
- Location within Bulgaria
- Coordinates: 42.2000°N 23.0833°E
- Country: Bulgaria
- Province: Kyustendil Province
- Municipality: Dupnitsa
- Time zone: UTC+2 (EET)
  - Summer (DST): UTC+3 (EEST)

Krayni Dol (Bulgarian: Крайни дол) is a village in Dupnitsa Municipality, located in the Kyustendil Province of southwestern Bulgaria.
