= Dupnitsa Municipality =

Dupnitsa Municipality Община Дупница
- Municipality
- Location within Bulgaria
- Coordinates: 42°16′N 23°7′E
- Country: Bulgaria
- Province: Kyustendil
- Municipality: Dupnitsa

Area
  - Total: 329.06 km^{2} (127.05 sq mi)

Population (1-Feb-2011)
  - Total: 44,988
  - Density: 136.72/km^{2} (354.09/sq mi)
- Time zone: UTC+2 (EET)
  - Summer (DST): UTC+3 (EEST)
- Website: www.dupnitsa.bg

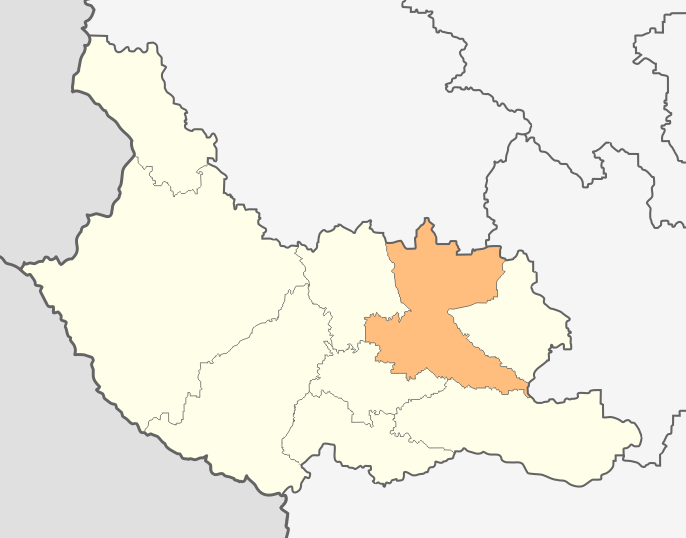
Dupnitsa municipality within Kyustendil Province

Dupnitsa Municipality is a municipality in Kyustendil Province, Bulgaria. The administrative centre is Dupnitsa.

== Demography ==
=== Religion ===
According to the latest Bulgarian census of 2011, the religious composition, among those who answered the optional question on religious identification, was the following:

Religious composition of Dupnitsa Municipality
Orthodox Christianity	88.5%
Catholicism	0.2%
Protestantism	1.5%
Islam	0.1%
No religion	3.0%
Prefer not to answer, others and indefinable	6.7%

== Villages ==
In addition to the capital town of Dupnitsa, the municipality consists of 16 villages.

- Balanovo
- Bistritsa
- Blatino
- Gramade
- Delyan
- Dzherman
- Dyakovo
- Krayni Dol
- Kraynitsi
- Kremenik
- Palatovo
- Piperovo
- Samoranovo
- Topolnitsa
- Cherven Breg
- Yahinovo
