= St. John of Rila Church (Chicago) =

Coordinates: 41°57′31″N 87°46′33″W

Bulgarian Orthodox Church "St. Ivan Rilski" - Chicago
- St. John of Rila in 2026
- Bulgarian Orthodox Church "St. Ivan Rilski" - Chicago
- Country: United States
- Denomination: Orthodox
- Website: stjohnofrilachurch.com

Architecture
- Years built: 1928

St. John of Rila in Chicago, (Bulgarian: Църква Свети Иван Рилски, romanized: 'Tsurkva Sveti Ivan Rilski') is a historic church of the Orthodox Church of America in Chicago, Illinois.

== History ==
The church building was originally built and housed a Lutheran congregation under the name of the Peace Lutheran Church. The building was put up for auction as Peace Lutheran consolidated its parish with a number of other Lutheran congregations on Chicago's Northwest Side. The congregation of St. John of Rila, Wonderworker which had formed in February 1996 was looking for a church of its own as it had been celebrating services in the Holy Cross Chapel at St. Andrew Greek Orthodox Church in Chicago. After winning the highly competitive auction, the first services at the new beautiful church were celebrated on February 7, 1999.

St. John of Rila is important for Bulgarians in Chicago because national churches in America, in addition to being places of worship, are social center devoted to maintaining the language, culture and tradition of the Bulgarian diaspora through Sunday schools and social gatherings.

In October 2003, Princess Marie Louise of Bulgaria toured the church.

== Architecture ==
Originally constructed in 1928, this beautiful brick and limestone church building has approximately 3,979 square feet (369.7 m^{2}) above grade area, including a 552-square-foot (51.3 m^{2}) balcony, overlooking the main church floor which seats approximately 216 people. The original interior has been adapted to conform to Eastern Orthodox liturgical requirements, and a traditional hand carved iconostasis has been installed. The 3,427-square-foot (318.4 m^{2}) finished basement has a large auditorium with a stage used for theatrical and cultural performances." The parish house which is attached to the church building was completed in 1923 and served as the main place of worship until the church's completion in December 1928.
