= Sopovo =

Sopovo Сопово
- Village
- Location within Bulgaria
- Coordinates: 42°11′N 23°2′E
- Country: Bulgaria
- Province: Kyustendil Province
- Municipality: Boboshevo

Area
  - Total: 4.172 km^{2} (1.611 sq mi)
- Elevation: 393 m (1,289 ft)

Population (2013)
  - Total: 35
- Time zone: UTC+2 (EET)
  - Summer (DST): UTC+3 (EEST)
- Postal Code: 2664

Sopovo (Bulgarian: Сопово) is a village in Boboshevo Municipality, Kyustendil Province, south-western Bulgaria. As of 2013 it has 35 inhabitants.

== History ==
The village was most likely established during the period of Turkish rule, when several families fleeing the Turks settled there. According to legend, Baba Militsa, from the Mitev family, killed a Turkish tax collector with a sop (wooden club) because he was pestering her daughter, Maria. It is believed that that is the origin of the name of the town.

== Landmarks ==
A significant landmark is the local St Petka church.
