= Delyan, Kyustendil Province =

Delyan Делян
- Village
- Location within Bulgaria
- Coordinates: 42.3833°N 23.1000°E
- Country: Bulgaria
- Province: Kyustendil Province
- Municipality: Dupnitsa
- Time zone: UTC+2 (EET)
  - Summer (DST): UTC+3 (EEST)

Delyan (Bulgarian: Делян) is a village in Dupnitsa Municipality, Kyustendil Province, south-western Bulgaria.
