= Princess Marie Louise of Bulgaria =

Bulgarian princess (born 1933)

Princess Marie Louise
- Princess of Koháry; Princess Karl of Leiningen
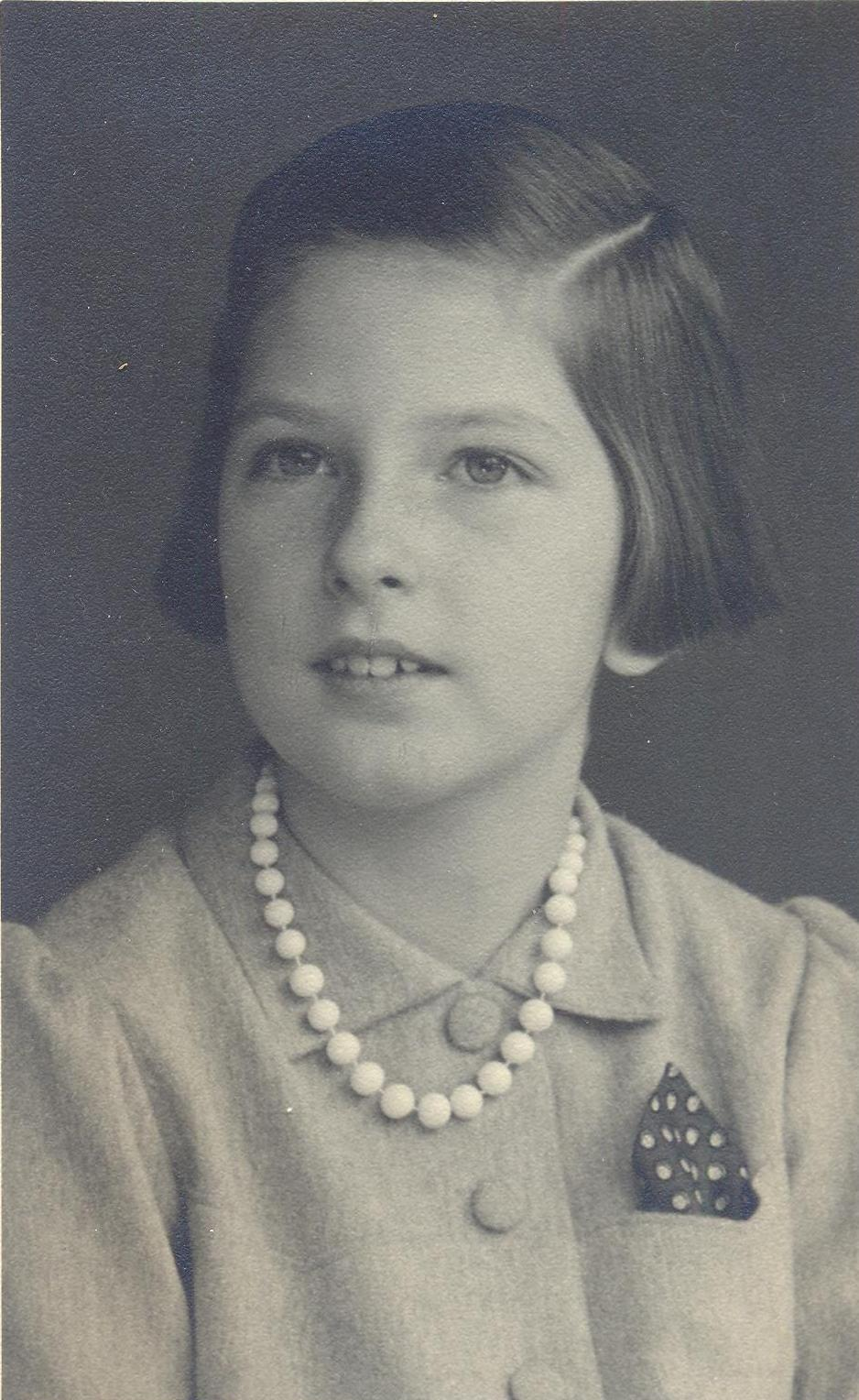
- Princess Marie Louise of Bulgaria
- Born: 13 January 1933 (age 93); Vrana Palace, Sofia, Kingdom of Bulgaria
- Spouse: Prince Karl of Leiningen (m. 1957; div. 1968) Bronisław Chrobok (m. 1969; died 2025)
- Issue: Prince Boris; Prince Hermann Friedrich; Princess Alexandra; Prince Pawel
- House: Saxe-Coburg and Gotha-Koháry
- Father: Boris III of Bulgaria
- Mother: Giovanna of Savoy

Princess Marie Louise of Bulgaria (Bulgarian: Княгиня Мария Луиза Българска; born 13 January 1933) also known as Marie Louise Borisova Saxe-Coburg-Gotha, is the daughter of Tsar Boris III and Tsaritsa Ioanna and the older sister of Simeon II of Bulgaria. Her baptism in the Bulgarian Orthodox Church caused controversy at the time because her mother had promised to raise her children as Catholics. After the change in house laws into absolute primogeniture by her brother Simeon II, Princess Marie Louise became the head of the house of House of Saxe-Coburg and Gotha-Koháry.

== Biography ==
Her godfather was Aleksandar Malinov.

She was enrolled at the Medical Nurse College of the Spanish Red Cross Society, which she graduated with honours.

After the abolition of the monarchy in 1946, Princess Marie Louise left the country with her mother and brother. They first lived in Egypt and then moved to Spain. With her brother, she took part in the ship tour organized by King Paul of Greece and Queen Frederica in 1954, which became known as the "Cruise of the Kings" and was attended by over 100 royals from all over Europe.

=== Marriage and issue ===
She married Prince Karl of Leiningen (2 January 1928, Coburg, Germany – 28 September 1990, Vered Hagalil, Israel) in a civil ceremony on 14 February 1957 in Amorbach and in a religious ceremony on 20 February 1957 in Cannes. Karl and Marie Louise divorced on 4 December 1968. The couple had two sons:

- Prince Boris of Leiningen (born 17 April 1960) married Millena Manov on 14 February 1987 and they were divorced in 1996. They have one son. Boris remarried Cheryl Riegler on 11 September 1998. They had two children.
- Prince Hermann Friedrich of Leiningen (born 16 April 1963) married Deborah Cully on 16 May 1987, They have three daughters.

On 16 November 1969, she married Bronisław Tomasz Andrzej Chrobok (27 August 1934, Katowice, Poland – 30 June 2025, Madison, USA; son of Polish Brigadier general Pawel Wincenty Chrobok and wife Maria Sarnowska), in Toronto, Canada. Subsequently they lived in New Jersey, United States and have a daughter and a son:

- Princess Alexandra-Nadejda of Koháry (born 14 September 1970), her mother's heiress apparent to the headship of the House of Saxe-Coburg and Gotha-Koháry, married Jorge Champalimaud Raposo de Magalhães (born 16 September 1970, scion of two Portuguese industrial families, grandnephew of António Champalimaud) on 8 September 2001. They have three children. She holds a degree in English literature from Bishop's University and in graphic design from Pratt Institute of New York, and is a member of the board of trustees of the King Boris and Queen Giovanna Fund who manages Vrana Palace in Sofia. Alexandra is very active in the study and promotion of the historical relations between Portugal and the House of Saxe-Coburg and Gotha. In 2005 she organized the signing of a cultural cooperation protocol between the Saxe-Coburg-Gotha family Foundation and the Parques de Sintra, that manages Pena National Palace, built by her great-great-grand uncle Ferdinand II of Portugal. She also donated a portrait of the said king to the national museum of Saint Anton in Slovakia in a ceremony at the Palácio das Necessidades, seat of the Portuguese Foreign Affairs Ministry.
- Prince Pawel Alastair Antoni of Koháry (born 3 May 1972), married Ariana Oliver Mas in 2014. They have two children.

=== Princess of Koháry ===
The title "Princess of Koháry" was ceded to Princess Marie Louise and the descendants of her second marriage, by her brother King Simeon II, in September 2015.

=== Professional life ===
Princess Marie Louise is a member of the Board of Trustees of the American University in Bulgaria.

On 13 May 2012, at the 18th commencement ceremony, Princess Marie Louise received an honorary doctoral degree in Humane Letters from the American University in Bulgaria.

In 2001, she visited and toured the church of St John of Rila the Wonderworker in Chicago's Portage Park community area.

== Honours ==
=== Dynastic ===
- (Tsardom of Bulgaria (1908–1946)) House of Saxe-Coburg and Gotha-Koháry: Knight Grand Cross of the Royal Order of Saint Alexander

=== Foreign ===
- Sovereign Military Order of Malta: Knight Grand Cross of Honour and Devotion of the Order of Saint John (7 March 2023)
