= Skrino =

Skrino Скрино
- Village
- Ruen Monastery

- Location within Bulgaria
- Coordinates: 42°11′N 22°57′E
- Country: Bulgaria
- Province: Kyustendil Province
- Municipality: Boboshevo

Area
  - Total: 15.034 km^{2} (5.805 sq mi)
- Elevation: 560 m (1,840 ft)

Population (2013)
  - Total: 66
- Time zone: UTC+2 (EET)
  - Summer (DST): UTC+3 (EEST)
- Postal Code: 2663

Skrino (Bulgarian: Скрино) is a village in the municipality of Boboshevo, Kyustendil Province, western Bulgaria. As of 2013 it has 66 inhabitants.

== Geography ==
The village is located in the Ruen mountain, the northernmost part of the Vlahina mountain range.

== History ==
Skrino is known under the same name since the 9th century, when it was part of the Bulgarian Empire. It is believed to have been the birthplace of Saint John of Rila, the patron of the Bulgarian people. The Ruen Monastery is situated nearby.

== Famous people ==
- Saint John of Rila (c. 878–946)

== Honour ==
Skrino Rocks in the South Shetland Islands, Antarctica are named after the village.
