= Slatino furnace model =

Ancient artifact found in Bulgaria

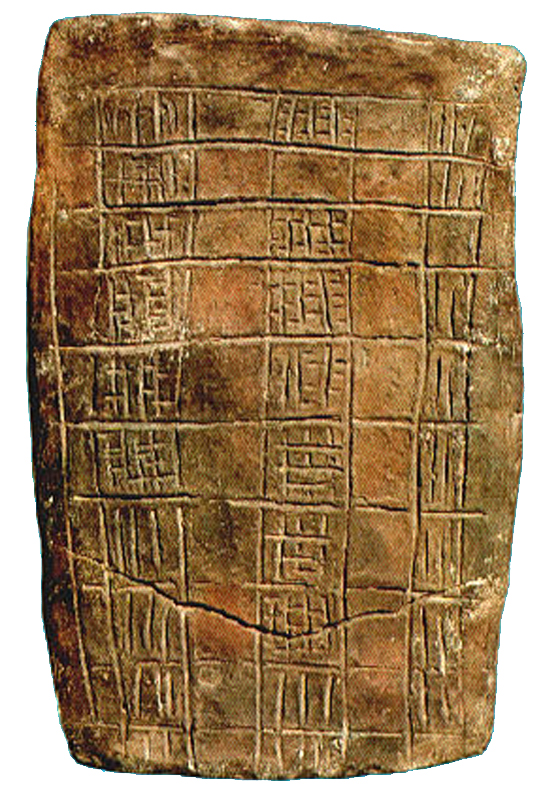
Base of the model, with possible calendar notation

The Slatino furnace model is an ancient ceramic artefact excavated at an archeological site near Slatino in Bulgaria. It was found among the remains of a burned down dwelling dated from the Eneolithic period (ca. 5000 BCE). The description 'furnace model' (and name) has been adopted in the absence of a definite idea about the use and meaning of the object. On its largest flat side there is a clearly traced rough square grid with 30 cases, 12 of them marked with color. Some studies of the artefact have proposed to see this as a graphical representation of a calendar. Assuming the dating and this interpretation both to be correct it would be probably the oldest one in Europe. The Slatino furnace model is a permanent feature at the Regional Historical Museum of Kyustendil.

The form of the artefact is a nearly rectangular box (appr. 15x10x8cm) with the short front flap laid open. On the top side is a handle with zoomorph features, perhaps a leopard. The right face bears a linear meander, on the left one and on the back side there are oblique square grid while the "calendar" is traced on the bottom side.

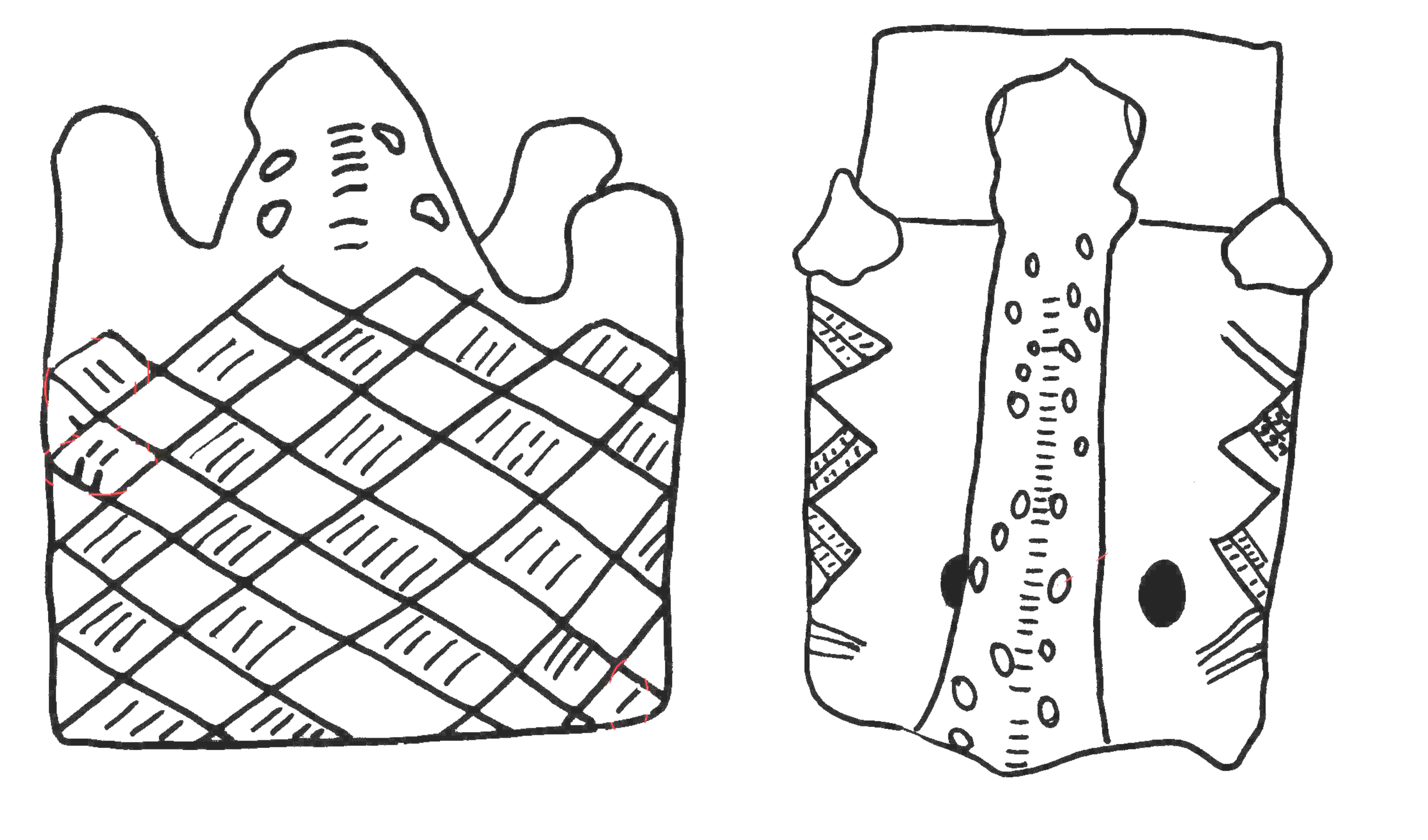
Slatino model graphics

The archeologist Stefan Chokadzhiev is credited with the discovery and he published the first description of his finding in 1984, proposing also the calendar interpretation. A few years later an alternative theory was proposed by Nikolov who saw the artefact as a kind of vessel for grain and proposed a connection to women and fertility which are supposed to be at the core of Old Europe culture.
