= Cherven Breg =

Cherven Breg Червен брег
- Village
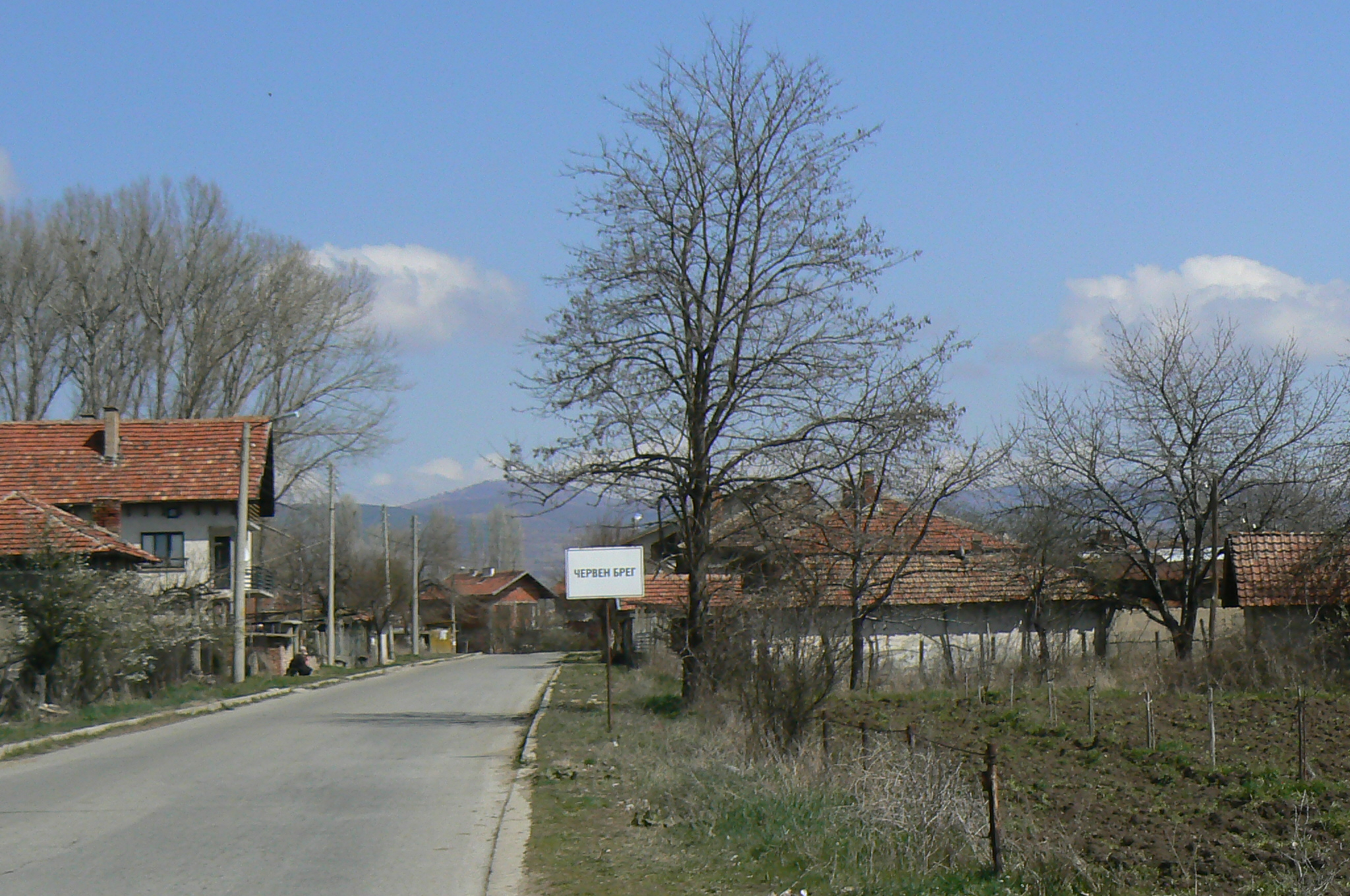
- Road sign in the village

- Location within Bulgaria
- Coordinates: 42.3000°N 23.1667°E
- Country: Bulgaria
- Province: Kyustendil Province
- Municipality: Dupnitsa
- Time zone: UTC+2 (EET)
  - Summer (DST): UTC+3 (EEST)

Cherven Breg (Bulgarian: Червен брег, also transliterated Červen Breg) is a village in Dupnitsa Municipality, Kyustendil Province, south-western Bulgaria.
