= Balanovo =

Balanovo Баланово
- Village
- Location within Bulgaria
- Coordinates: 42.2500°N 23.0667°E
- Country: Bulgaria
- Province: Kyustendil Province
- Municipality: Dupnitsa
- Elevation: 541 m (1,775 ft)

Population
  - Total: 454
- Time zone: UTC+2 (EET)
  - Summer (DST): UTC+3 (EEST)
- Website: https://www.mirela.bg/en/off-plan-properties/village-of-Balanovo-zxc35q2689.html

Balanovo (Bulgarian: Баланово) is a village of 454 people in Dupnitsa Municipality, Kyustendil Province, south-western Bulgaria. The valley in which this town is located is influenced by the Mediterranean climate, where the summers are warm and winters are mild. The city has good infrastructure, with mobile phone, internet, electricity and water supplied to the citizens. Balanovo is about 70 km south of Sofia, 9 km southwest of Dupnitsa. and There is a monument in the center of the city that honors the soldiers that died in World War II.
