= Kremenik, Bulgaria =

Kremenik Кременик
- Village
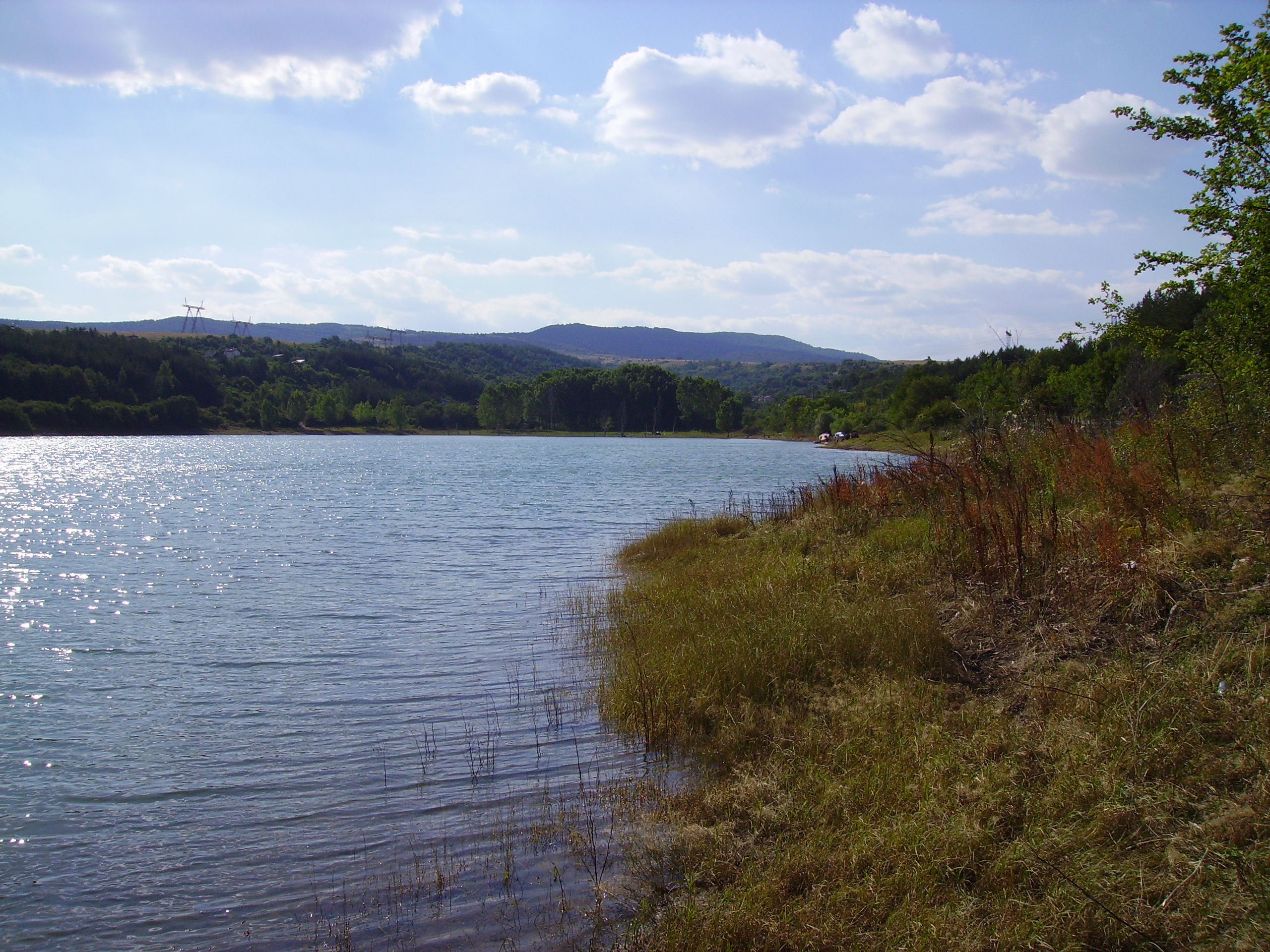
- View to the village of Kremenik from Dyakovo Dam

- Location within Bulgaria
- Coordinates: 42.3667°N 23.0500°E
- Country: Bulgaria
- Province: Kyustendil Province
- Municipality: Dupnitsa
- Time zone: UTC+2 (EET)
  - Summer (DST): UTC+3 (EEST)

Kremenik (Bulgarian: Кременик) is a village in Dupnitsa Municipality, Kyustendil Province, south-western Bulgaria.
