= Yahinovo =

Yahinovo Яхиново
- Village
- Location within Bulgaria
- Coordinates: 42.2833°N 23.1500°E
- Country: Bulgaria
- Province: Kyustendil Province
- Municipality: Dupnitsa
- Time zone: UTC+2 (EET)
  - Summer (DST): UTC+3 (EEST)

Yahinovo (Bulgarian: Яхиново) is a village in Dupnitsa Municipality, Kyustendil Province, south-western Bulgaria.

Yahinovo is home to about 1924 residents within a territory of 12.276km2. The small djubrena river runs through the middle of the town, which many residents use water from to water larger plots of land or gardens.

== School ==
There is one school in the village which holds students from kindergarten through eighth grade called Cyril and Methodius (“Кирил и Методиј”). The school is named in dedication to Cyril and Methodius who created the first alphabet in the old Slavonic language.

Public transportation is not provided to the school. It is common for students to walk or to be driven to school.

== Atmosphere ==
Many of the houses in Yahinovo, along with other surrounding villages, are built in an Ottoman style with stone and wood. The residents of this village also pay special attention to the decorations put throughout their houses. Many residents incorporate traditional Bulgarian embroidery into their houses, primarily in curtains or in bed sheets. Similarly, there are some traditions such as placing a horseshoe in the entryway of a house to bring in good luck, as well as placing a blue evil eye decoration somewhere within the household to repel negative energy.

== Town life ==
The village of Yahinovo is in a very rural location. Many of the residents are owners of large lots of land within the village which are primarily used for farming in order to produce crops or to move livestock to graze during the day. It is common for residents to own animals such as cows, chickens, and goats in order produce milk and eggs.

== Celebrations ==
The main celebration in Yahinovo is the event which celebrates the village itself. This holiday is celebrated every year on October 14. Many residents and residents from nearby villages will travel to Yahinovo and celebrate through cuisine and traditional dance. Many vendors also travel to this event in order to sell more food or artwork.
