= Prince Karl of Leiningen =

Prince of Leiningen

Prince Karl
- Born: 2 January 1928; Coburg, Germany
- Died: 28 September 1990 (aged 62); Vered Hagalil, Israel
- Spouse: Princess Marie Louise of Bulgaria (m. 1957; div. 1968)
- Issue: Prince Boris; Prince Hermann
Names
- Karl Vladimir Ernst Heinrich
- House: Leiningen
- Father: Karl, 6th Prince of Leiningen
- Mother: Maria Kirillovna of Russia

Prince Karl of Leiningen (Karl Vladimir Ernst Heinrich; 2 January 1928 – 28 September 1990) was the second son of Karl, 6th Prince of Leiningen (1898–1946), and Grand Duchess Maria Kirillovna of Russia. She was the elder daughter of Grand Duke Kirill Vladimirovich of Russia and Princess Victoria Melita of Edinburgh. As such, Karl was a great-great-grandson of both Queen Victoria of the United Kingdom and Emperor Alexander II of Russia (as Victoria Melita and Kirill Vladimirovich were both grandchildren of Alexander II).

== Biography ==
=== Career ===
Born in Coburg, Germany, he worked mainly as a salesman in Paris as a young man. With his wife, Karl subsequently resolved to take up a business career in Toronto, Canada. Eventually, he became an executive at a brokerage firm.

=== Marriage and issue ===
Karl met Princess Marie Louise of Bulgaria in Madrid, where she was living with her mother. She was the only daughter of Boris III of Bulgaria by his wife Princess Giovanna of Italy. Karl announced his engagement to Marie Louise in December 1956. They married in a Bulgarian Orthodox Ceremony in Cannes on 19 February 1957, following a quiet civil ceremony on February 14 in Amorbach, Germany. Amorbach had been the residence of the House of Leiningen since 1803, and the town's streets were lined with hundreds of cheering spectators; Karl's family owns huge estates in South Germany, and was considered to be one of the wealthiest of Germany's noble families. As of 1957, his family's fortune was valued at $1.5 billion. The couple also married in a Greek Orthodox religious ceremony in Cannes on 20 February 1957.

After the couple's wedding, they lived in Madrid until June 1958. Karl traveled to Canada early in their marriage, and the couple decided to settle there. The marriage produced two sons:

- Prince Boris zu Leiningen (b. 17 April 1960), who married Millena Manov on 14 February 1987 and they were divorced in 1996. They have one son. Boris remarried Cheryl Riegler on 11 September 1998. They had two children.
- Prince Hermann zu Leiningen (b. 16 April 1963), who married Deborah Cully on 16 May 1987. They have three daughters.

The marriage was unhappy, and Karl and Marie Louise divorced on 4 December 1968. Later in life, Karl reminisced, "Princes are expected to marry princesses, so I married Marie-Louise, the daughter of Bulgarian ex-King Boris III". After the divorce, Marie Louise and their two sons moved to the United States, where they attended a military academy.

=== Later life ===
Karl eventually became a naturalized Canadian citizen. He later moved to Zürich. Persuaded by some Jewish friends to visit Israel, Karl eventually found a job through the help of new-found Israeli friends. He subsequently moved there, rarely leaving except for short visits with his family. He lived in Israel until his death on 28 September 1990 in Vered Hagalil.

== Ancestry ==
Ancestors of Prince Karl of Leiningen

8. Ernst Leopold, 4th Prince of Leiningen
4. Emich, 5th Prince of Leiningen
9. Princess Marie of Baden
2. Karl, 6th Prince of Leiningen
10. Hermann, Prince of Hohenlohe-Langenburg
5. Princess Feodore of Hohenlohe-Langenburg
11. Princess Leopoldine of Baden
1. Prince Karl of Leiningen
12. Grand Duke Vladimir Alexandrovich of Russia
6. Cyril Vladimirovich, Grand Duke of Russia
13. Duchess Marie of Mecklenburg-Schwerin
3. Grand Duchess Maria Kirillovna of Russia
14. Alfred, Duke of Saxe-Coburg and Gotha
7. Princess Victoria Melita of Edinburgh
15. Grand Duchess Maria Alexandrovna of Russia
