= Usoyka =

Usoyka Усойка
- Village
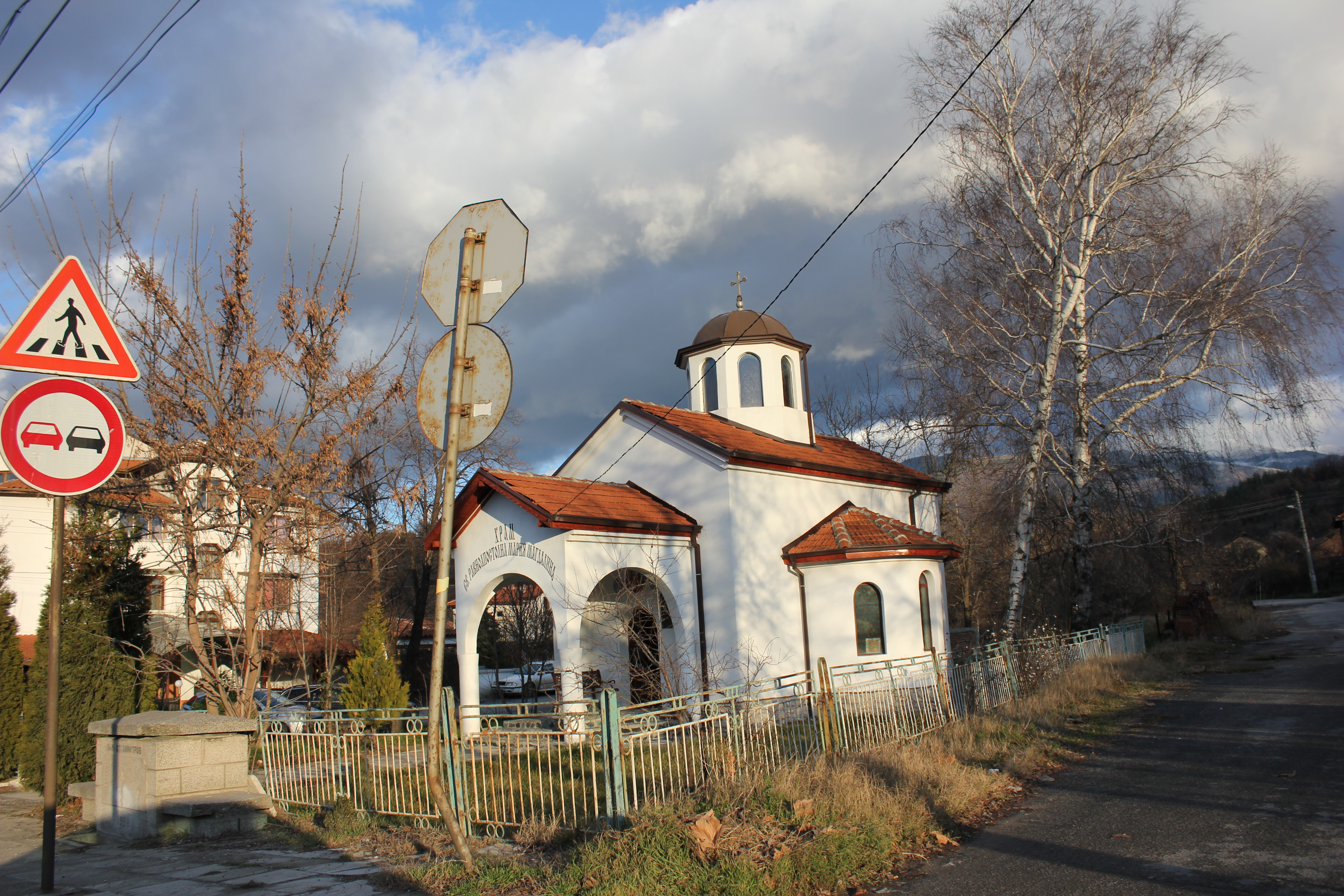

- Location within Bulgaria
- Coordinates: 42°11′N 23°3′E
- Country: Bulgaria
- Province: Kyustendil Province
- Municipality: Boboshevo

Area
  - Total: 6.261 km^{2} (2.417 sq mi)
- Elevation: 473 m (1,552 ft)

Population (2013)
  - Total: 394
- Time zone: UTC+2 (EET)
  - Summer (DST): UTC+3 (EEST)
- Postal Code: 2675

Usoyka (Bulgarian: Усойка) is a village in Boboshevo Municipality, Kyustendil Province, south-western Bulgaria. As of 2013 it has 394 inhabitants.
