= Dyakovo, Gryazovetsky District, Vologda Oblast =

Dyakovo Дьяково
- Village
- Location within Vologda Oblast Location within Russia
- Coordinates: 58°51′N 40°00′E
- Country: Russia
- Region: Vologda Oblast
- District: Gryazovetsky District
- Time zone: UTC+3:00

Dyakovo (Russian: Дьяково) is a rural locality (a village) in Yurovskoye Rural Settlement, Gryazovetsky District, Vologda Oblast, Russia. It had a population of 3 as of 2002.

== Geography ==
Dyakovo is located 17 km (11 mi) west of Gryazovets (the district's administrative centre) by road. Skorodumka is the nearest rural locality.
