= Kamenik, Bulgaria =

Kamenik Каменик
- Village
- Location within Bulgaria
- Coordinates: 42.2167°N 23.0167°E
- Country: Bulgaria
- Province: Kyustendil Province
- Municipality: Boboshevo
- Time zone: UTC+2 (EET)
  - Summer (DST): UTC+3 (EEST)

Kamenik is a village in Boboshevo Municipality, Kyustendil Province, south-western Bulgaria.

== Geography ==
The village of Kamenik is located in a semi-mountainous region.

== Landmarks ==
The oldest church in the Kyustendil district is located in the village of Kamenik. It is partially ruined and situated within the village cemetery grounds. The church is named "St. Ivan Rilski."
