= Dzherman, Kyustendil Province =

Dzherman Джерман
- Village
- Location within Bulgaria
- Coordinates: 42.2167°N 23.0833°E
- Country: Bulgaria
- Province: Kyustendil Province
- Municipality: Dupnitsa
- Time zone: UTC+2 (EET)
  - Summer (DST): UTC+3 (EEST)

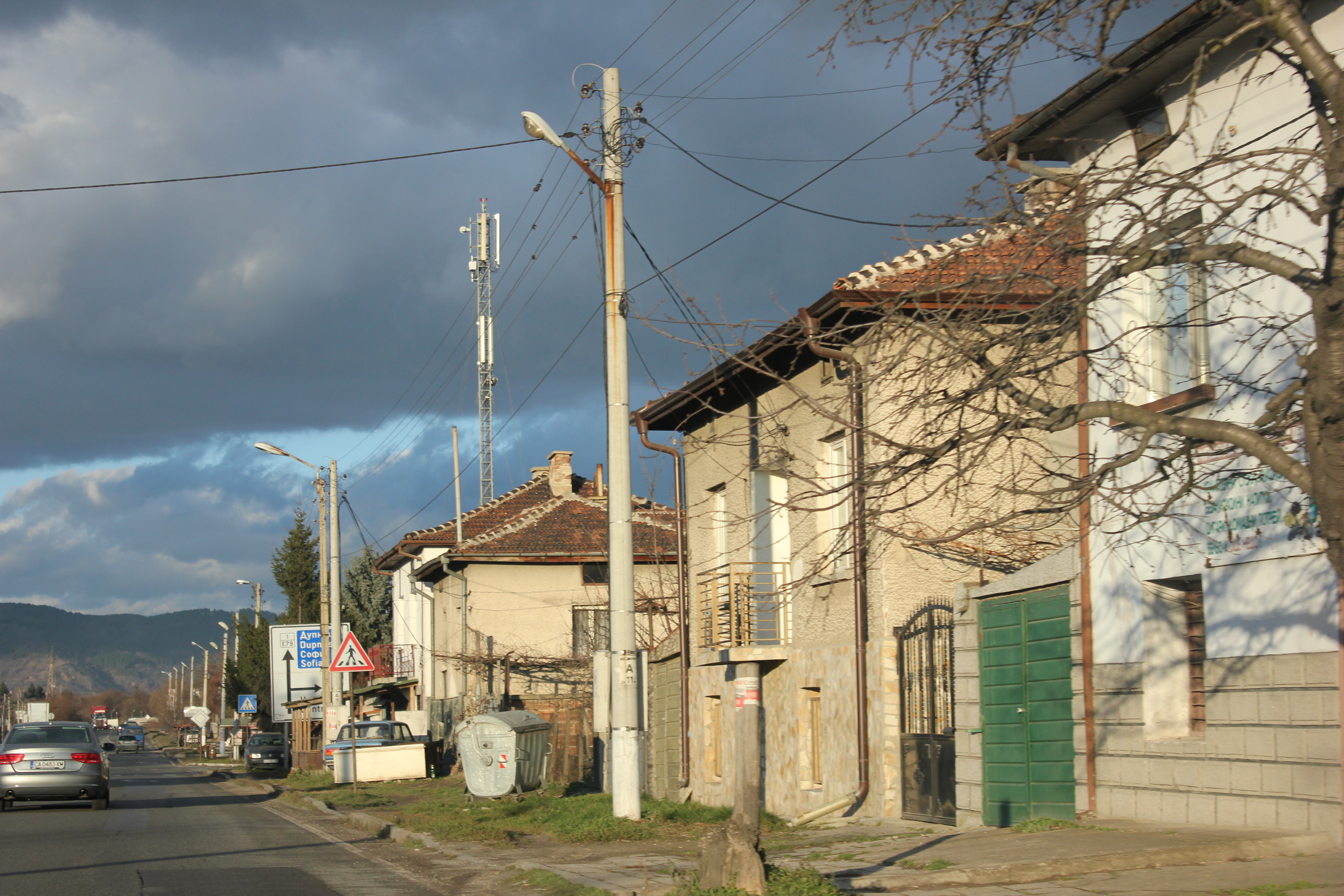
Dzherman

Dzherman (Bulgarian: Джерман [ˈd͡ʒɛrmɐn]) is a village in Dupnitsa Municipality, Kyustendil Province, south-western Bulgaria.
