= Vered HaGalil =

American-style ranch in the Galilee

Coordinates: 32°54′18″N 35°33′02″E

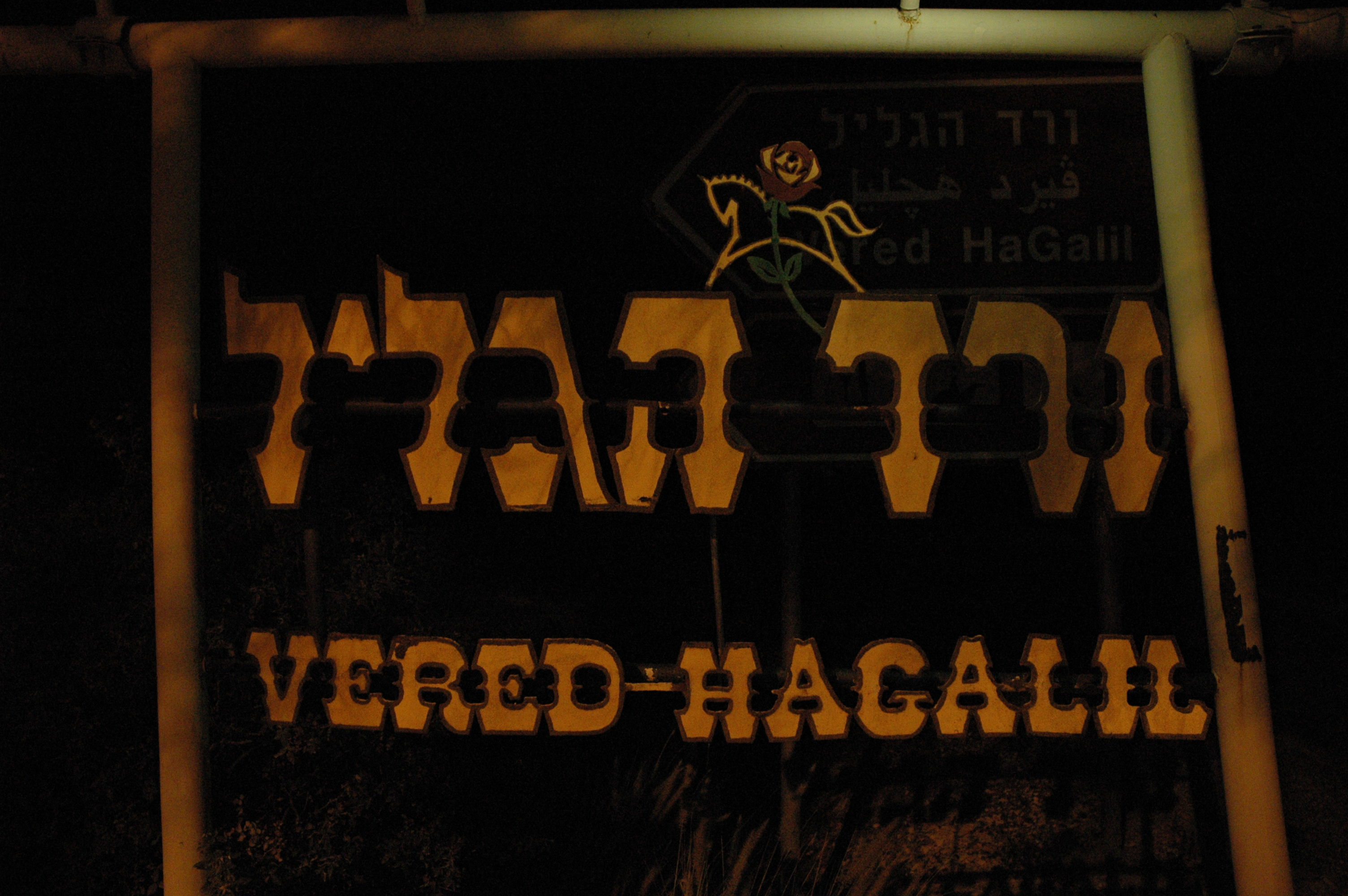
- Province: Galilee
- Country: Israel
- Established: 1961
- Owner: Yehuda Avni (originally)
- Produces: Roses
- Status: Now used as a hotel

Vered Hagalil ("Rose of Galilee" in Hebrew) is an American-style ranch in the Galilee, uphill from the northern shore of the Sea of Galilee. The ranch was founded in 1961 by Yehuda Avni, a Chicago-born Jew who established himself in Israel in 1949. At the time, it was a largely barren hillside, where they built the ranch-house, and for many years cultivated roses that were used to manufacture a drink. The ranch is now verdant and landscaped with mature trees, and the business has developed into a hotel that provides a focal point for tours of Galilee, and horse-back riding.

A German-Russian prince, Karl Vladimir Ernst Heinrich, Prince Karl of Leiningen took up residence in Israel and died in Vered Hagalil in 1990.
