= Dyakovo, Vologodsky District, Vologda Oblast =

Dyakovo Дьяково
- Village
- Location within Vologda Oblast Location within Russia
- Coordinates: 59°07′N 40°02′E
- Country: Russia
- Region: Vologda Oblast
- District: Vologodsky District
- Time zone: UTC+3:00

Dyakovo (Russian: Дьяково) is a rural locality (a village) in Podlesnoye Rural Settlement, Vologodsky District, Vologda Oblast, Russia. The population was 2 as of 2002.

== Geography ==
Dyakovo is located 17 km southeast of Vologda (the district's administrative centre) by road. Gribkovo is the nearest rural locality.
