= John of Rila =

Bulgarian hermit and saint (c. 876 – 946)

Saint Saint John of Rila
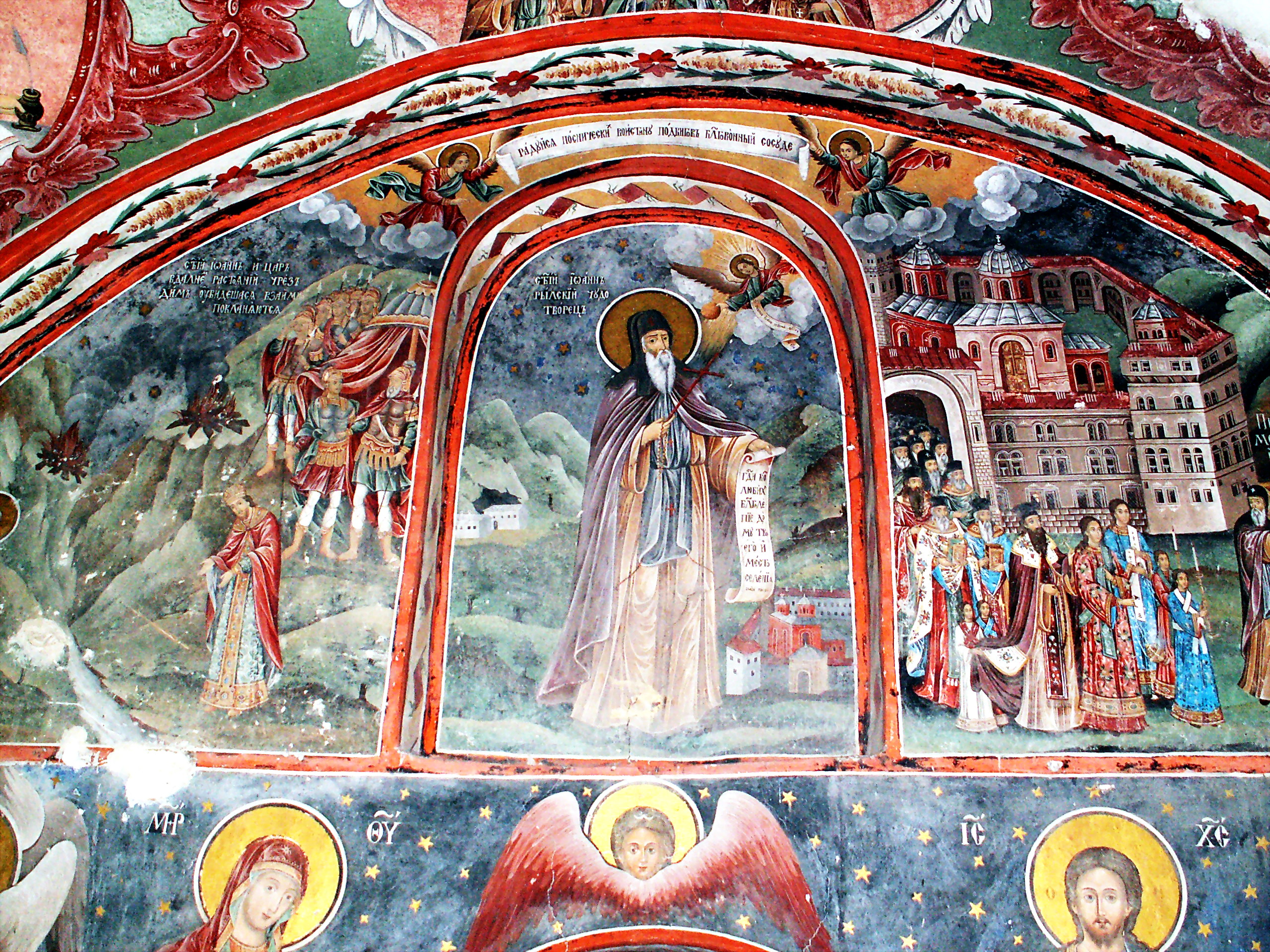
- A fresco depicting St. John of Rila from Rila Monastery, Bulgaria

Saint Monk, Wondermaker
- Born: c. 876; Skrino, First Bulgarian Empire
- Died: 18 August 946
- Venerated in: Eastern Orthodox Church; Catholic Church
- Feast: 19 October

Saint Ivan of Rila, also known as Ivan Rilski (Bulgarian: Свети преподобни Иван Рилски Чудотворец, romanized: Sveti prepodobni Ivan Rilski Chudotvorets, lit. 'Saint John of Rila the Wondermaker'; c. 876 – 18 August 946), was the first Bulgarian hermit. He was revered as a saint while he was still alive. The legend surrounding him tells of wild animals that freely came up to him and birds that landed in his hands. His followers founded many churches in his honor, including the famous Rila Monastery. One of these churches, Saint John of Rila was only discovered in 2008 in the town of Veliko Tarnovo. Today, he is honored as the patron saint of the Bulgarians and as one of the most important saints in the Bulgarian Orthodox Church.

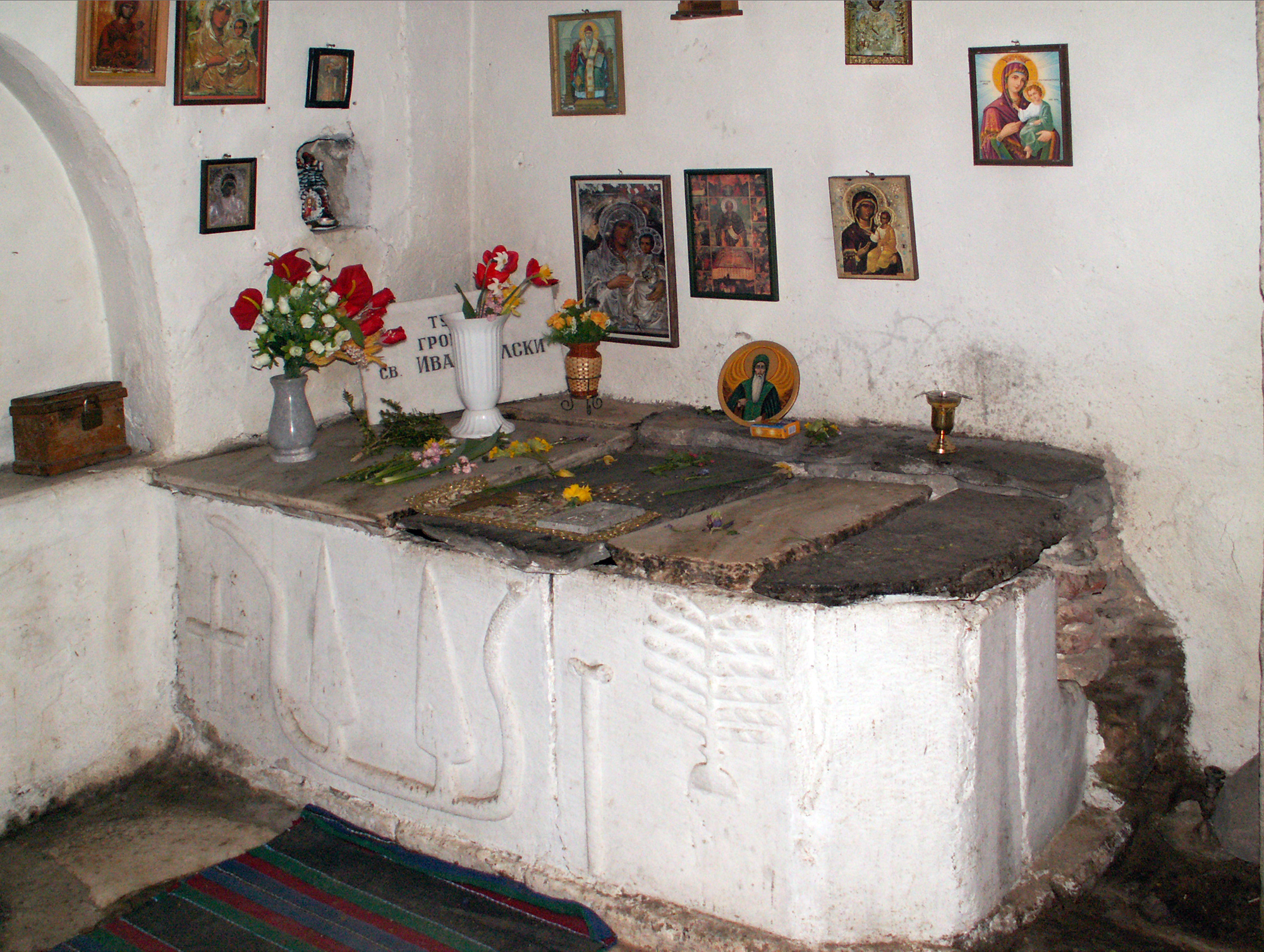
The tomb of John of Rila near Rila Monastery

== Life ==
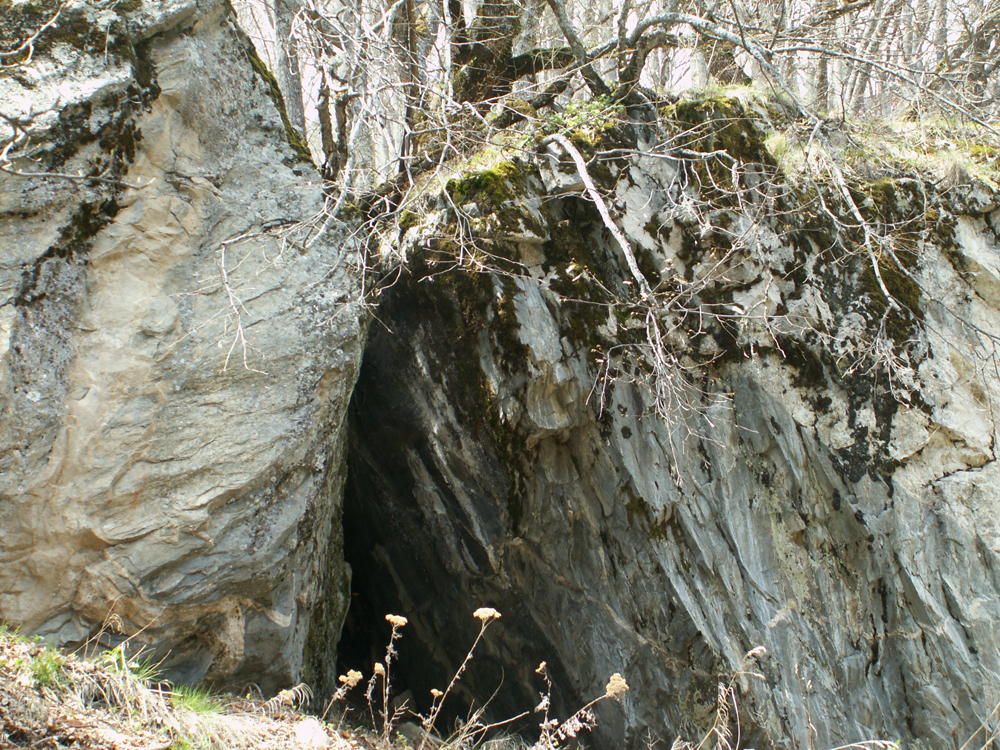
The Cave of John of Rila near the Rila Monastery

Saint John of Rila was born app. 876 a.c. in Skrino, at the foot of the Osogovo mountain. He was a contemporary of the reign of emperor and saint Boris I, his sons Vladimir (Rassate) and tsar Simeon I The Great, and the son of the latter - Saint tsar Peter I.

Originally a herder, at the age of 25, Saint John of Rila became a priest in the "St. Dimitrii" monastery located under peak Ruen. After accepting the life of a monk, he left the monastery in order to continue his life in solitude and prayer. Saint John of Rila lived in isolation in various locations before going to the Rila Mountains. There he spent the rest of his life in prayer and deprived himself of an everyday life by settling in the uncomfortable conditions of the caves in the Rila mountains.

According to legend, Saint John of Rila was known to have performed a multitude of miracles in order to help the people. These miracles brought him undesired fame as he tried to live the life of a hermit and avoid contact with others. With his growing number of followers, many young believers and supporters set up camps around his cave, seeking a blessing from him. This led the way to the creation of the Rila Monastery, which is considered to be the foremost monastery in Bulgaria.

Word of the miracles he performed reached the capital of the Bulgarian Empire - Great Preslav. Tsar Peter I (son of tsar Simeon I) took a 450 km trip to the Rila Mountains in order to meet St. John and seek spiritual advice. Their meeting is described in detail in one of the hagiologies of St. John of Rila as well as in the Testament of St. John of Rila itself. After a long and exhausting trip, tsar Peter I reached the place where St. John of Rila lived, however, upon arrival, the tsar then realized that the dwelling of the saint was inaccessible, probably due to the rough local terrain. As the medieval hagiologies point out, St. John of Rila refused to meet the tsar in person to avoid the temptation of vanity and pride due to the extraordinary visit. As such, the two men only bowed to each other from a distance. The emperor sent a soldier to deliver the gifts that were brought for the saint. St. John of Rila kept only a small portion of food and returned all of the gold and precious gifts, advising the tsar that monarchs need gold in order to protect the country and help the poor.

Shortly before his death (August 18, 946) St. John of Rila wrote his Testament (Zavet). A literary work and a moral message to his successors and to Bulgarian people.

As the patron saint of the Bulgarian people, his dormition is commemorated each year on August 18 and October 19.

== Remains ==
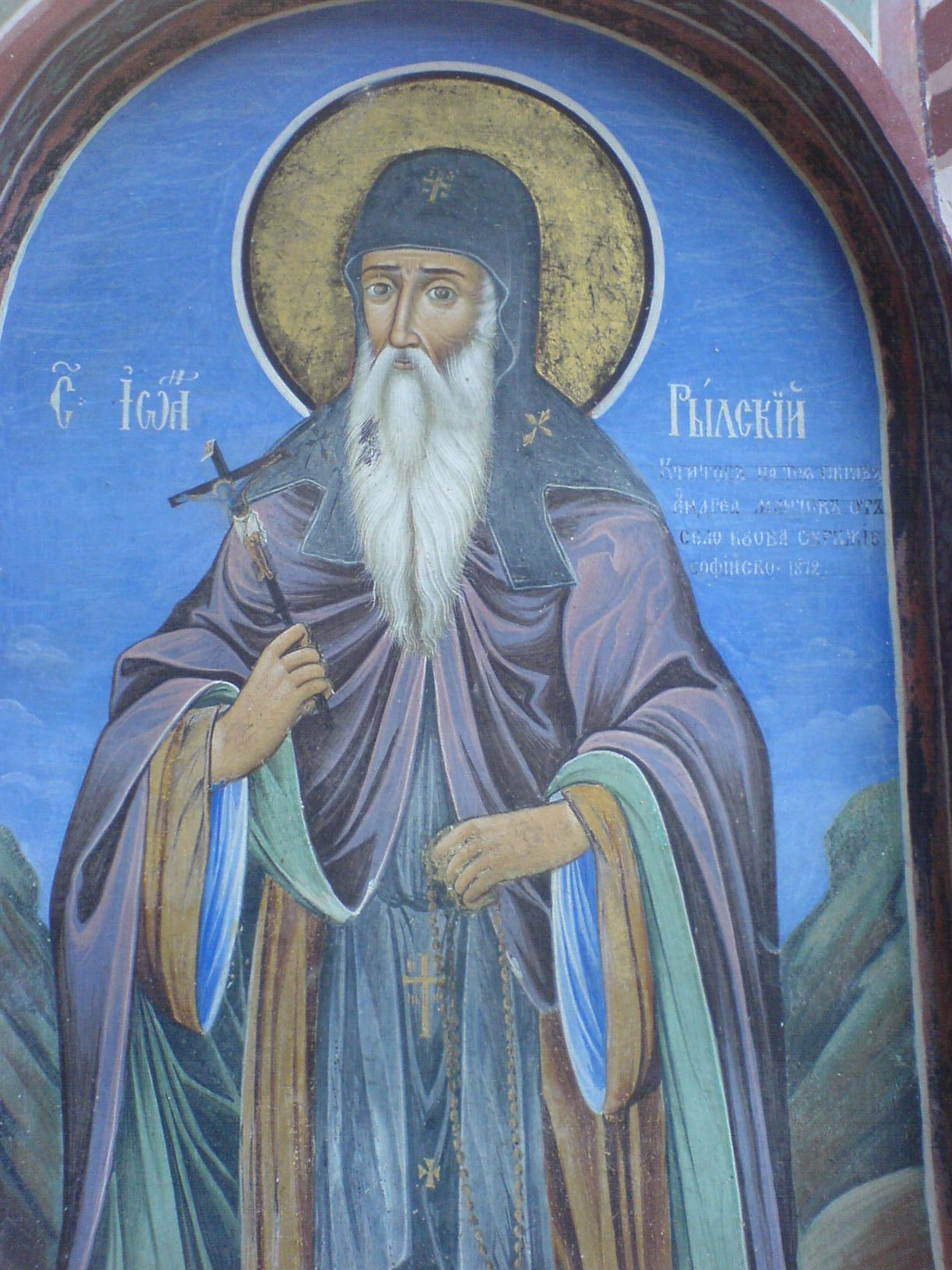
Saint John of Rila - fresco from the church in Rila monastery, Bulgaria.

Shortly after the saint's death, his remains, which were thought to have wonder-working powers, were transferred to Sofia during the reign of Peter I.

After Hungarian King Béla III conquered Sofia in 1183, the remains were sent to the Hungarian capital Esztergom and remained there for four years before being returned to Sofia in 1187.

In 1194, Bulgarian Tsar Ivan Asen I ordered the remains to be moved to his capital, Veliko Tarnovo. Surviving the Turkish conquest of the city in 1393, they were returned to the Rila Monastery in 1469 at the behest of Sultana Mara Branković, the widow of the late Murad II.

== Patronage and tributes ==
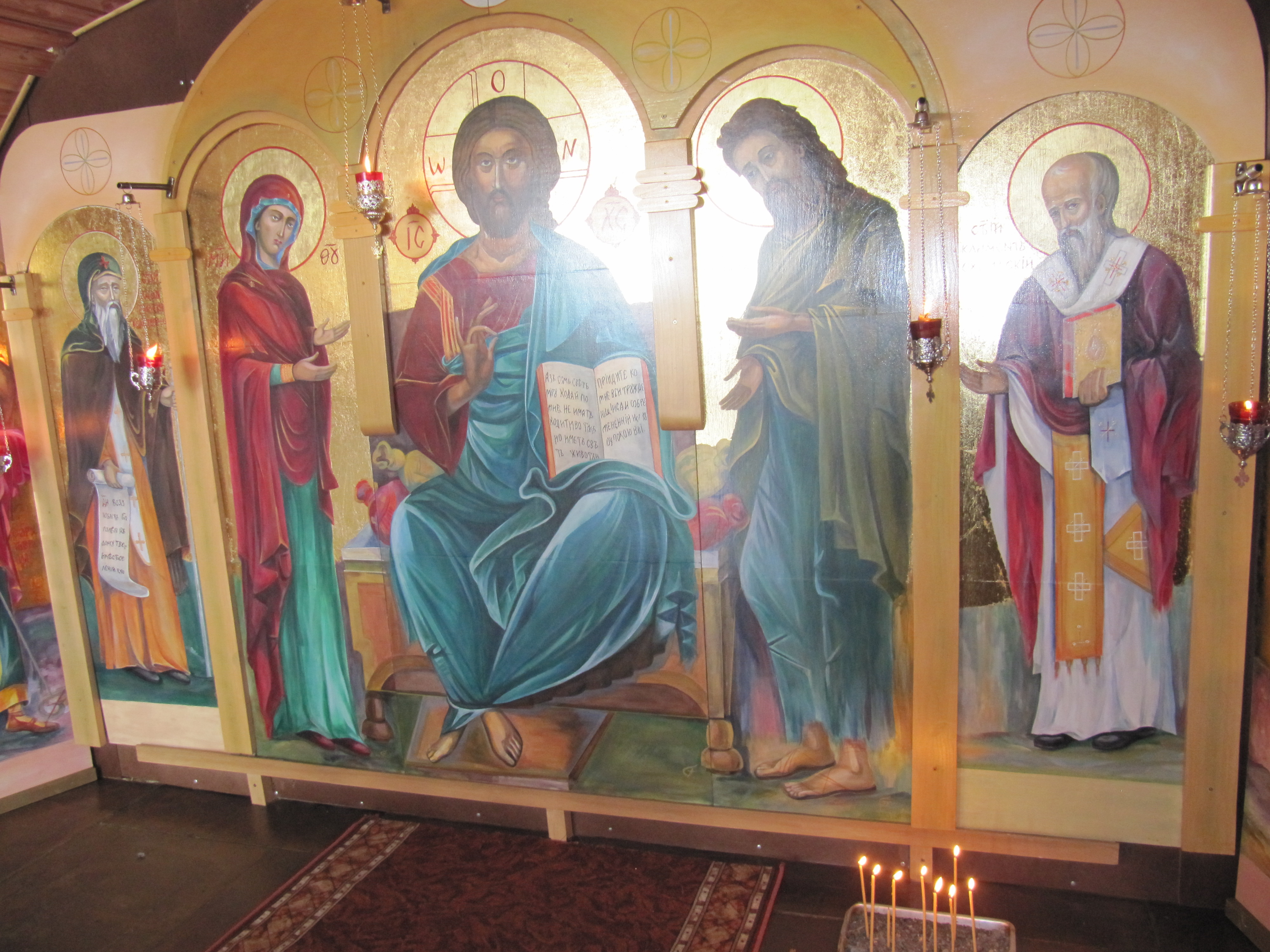
The altar of St. John of Rila Chapel in Antarctica

St. John of Rila is considered the patron saint of Bulgaria and Bulgarian people, and he is venerated widely both in his native country as well as among the Bulgarian diaspora abroad. He is traditionally regarded as the founder of the Rila Monastery, a UNESCO World Heritage Site regarded as one of Bulgaria's most important cultural, historical and architectural monuments. One of Chicago's two Bulgarian Orthodox churches St. John of Rila Church is dedicated to him, located in the Portage Park community area.

As the patron saint of the Bulgarian people, his dormition is commemorated each year on August 18 and October 19.

Ioannovsky Convent, the largest convent in St. Petersburg, commemorates this saint. St. Ivan Rilski Col on Livingston Island in the South Shetland Islands, Antarctica is named after John of Rila. The St. John of Rila Chapel built in 2003 at St. Kliment Ohridski Base on Livingston Island is the first Eastern Orthodox edifice in Antarctica and the southernmost Eastern Orthodox building of worship in the world.

An icon of John of Rila is depicted on the reverse of the Bulgarian 1 lev coin issued in 2002, and on the obverse of the former 1 lev banknote, issued in 1999. This tradition continued after Bulgaria's accession into the Eurozone as John of Rila is depicted on the national side of Bulgarian 1 euro coins.
