= Boboshevo Municipality =

Boboshevo Municipality Община Бобошево
- Municipality
- Location within Bulgaria
- Coordinates: 42°9′N 23°0′E
- Country: Bulgaria
- Province: Kyustendil
- Municipality: Boboshevo

Area
  - Total: 135.14 km^{2} (52.18 sq mi)

Population (1-Feb-2011)
  - Total: 2,870
  - Density: 21.2/km^{2} (55.0/sq mi)
- Time zone: UTC+2 (EET)
  - Summer (DST): UTC+3 (EEST)

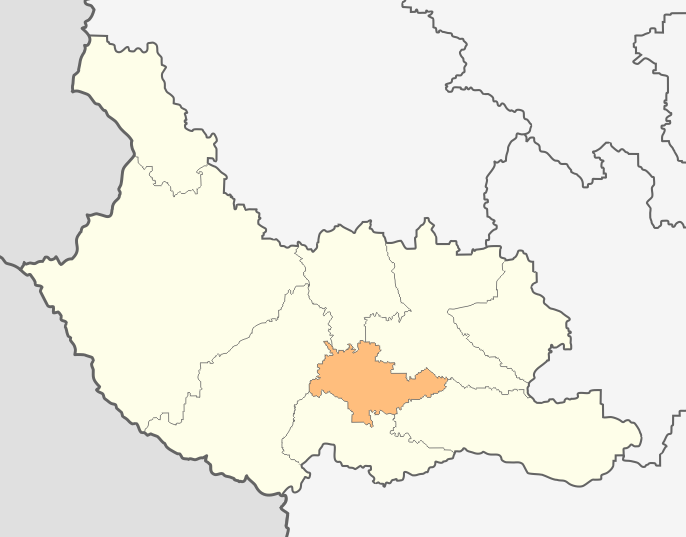
Boboshevo municipality within Kyustendil Province

Boboshevo Municipality is a municipality in Kyustendil Province, Bulgaria. The administrative centre is Boboshevo.

== Religion ==
According to the latest Bulgarian census of 2011, the religious composition, among those who answered the optional question on religious identification, was the following:

Religious composition of Boboshevo Municipality
Orthodox Christianity	96.5%
Catholicism	0.1%
Protestantism	0.0%
Islam	0.1%
No religion	0.8%
Prefer not to answer, others and indefinable	2.5%
