= Billbach (Mud) =

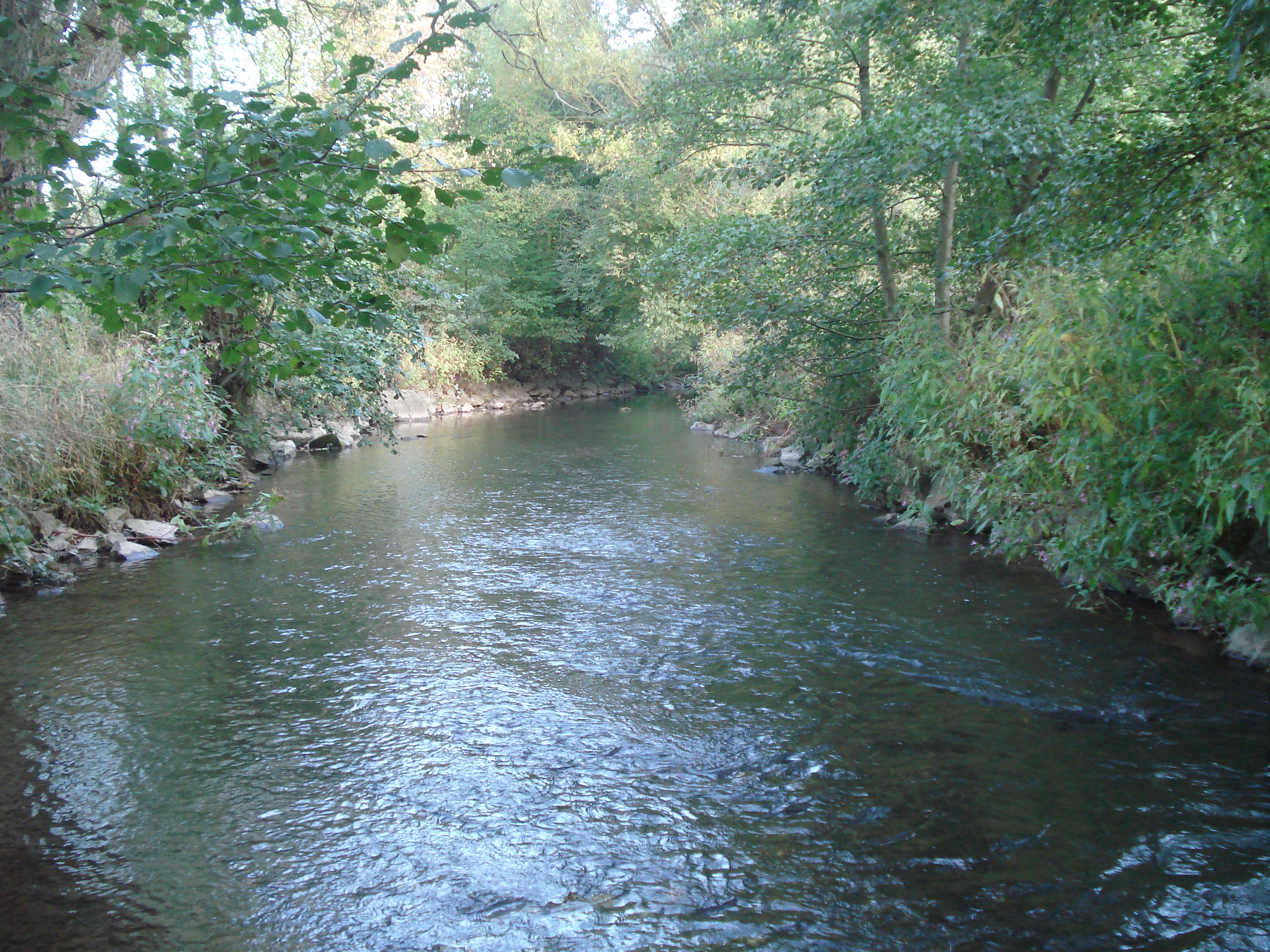
- The Billbach near Amorbach

Location
- Country: Germany
- State: Bavaria
- District: Miltenberg
- Reference no.: DE: 24724

Physical characteristics
- Source
  - location: Source: Confluence of the Marsbach and Morre
  - coordinates: 49°38′24″N 9°14′16″E
  - elevation: 160 m above sea level (NN) at the confluence
- Mouth
  - location: in Amorbach into the Mud
  - coordinates: 49°39′06″N 9°12′41″E
  - elevation: 153 m above sea level (NN)
- Length: 2.6 km (1.6 mi)
- Basin size: 188.5 km^{2} (72.8 sq mi)

Basin features
- Progression: Mud→ Main→ Rhine→ North Sea
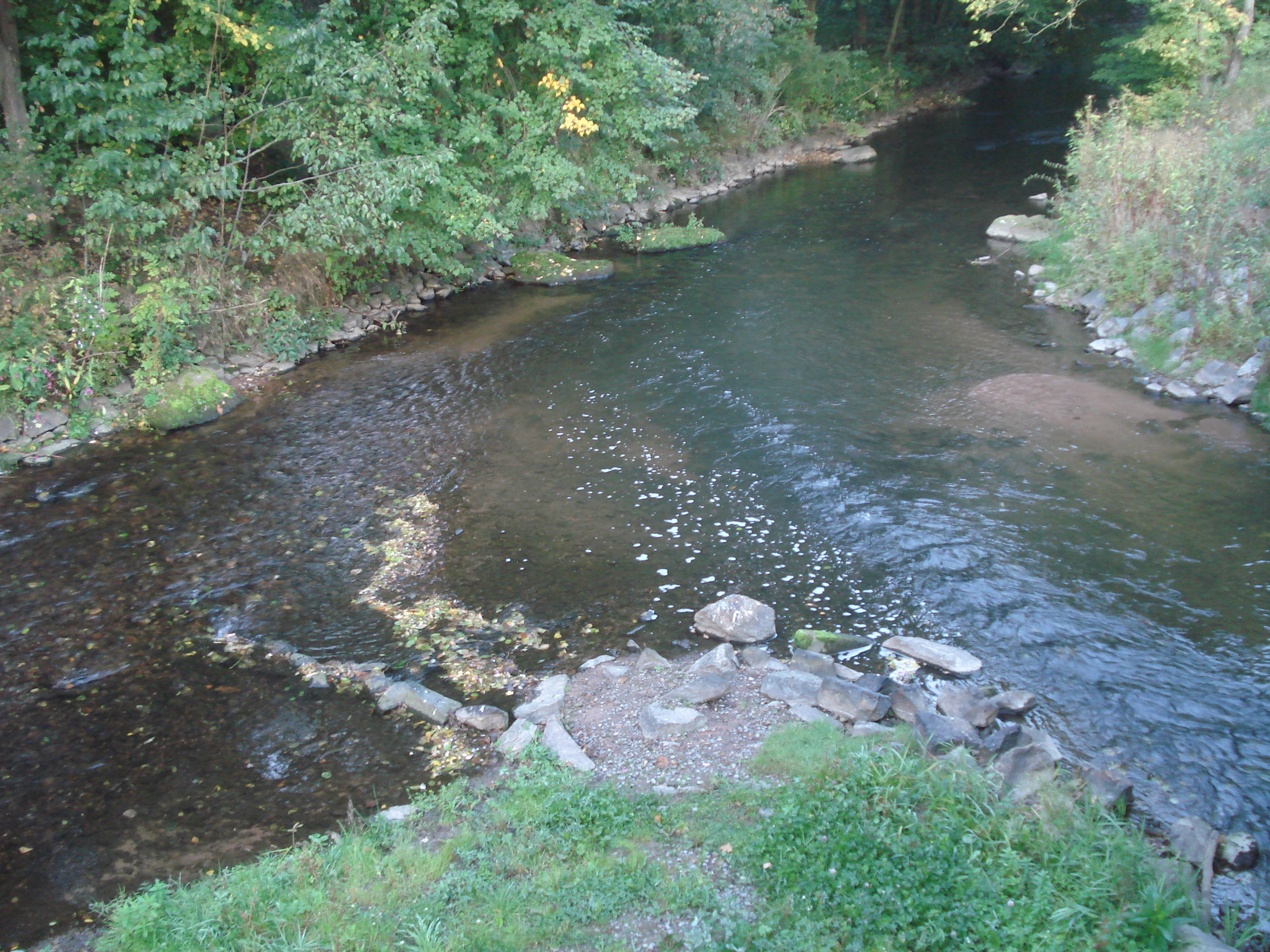
- The Billbach (front right) empties into the Mud (from front left to rear right)

The Billbach is a right-hand tributary of the Mud in Bavaria's Odenwald forest. It begins at the confluence of the Marsbach and Morre west of Schneeberg. Both headstreams rise in the state of Baden-Württemberg.

== Geography ==
=== Headstreams ===
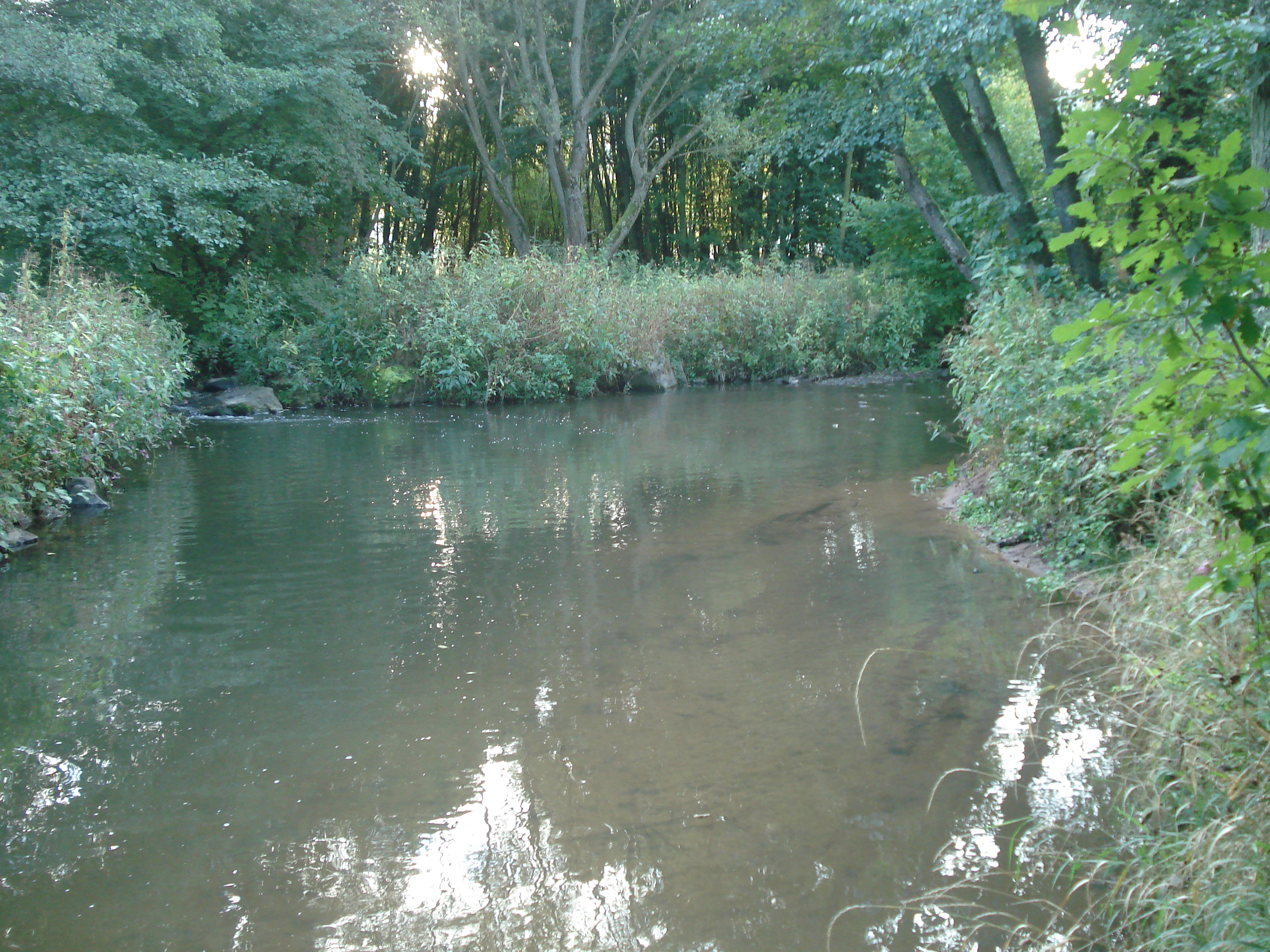
Confluence of the Marsbach (rear left) and Morre (rear right) to form the Billbach (front)

==== Marsbach ====
The Marsbach or Morsbach rises southeast of Walldürn in the vicinity of the historic Roman thermae. It flows in a northwesterly direction through Walldürn parallel to the B 47 to Rippberg, where it collects the Eiderbach. The Marsbach then crosses the state border into Bavaria. It is the 16.4 kilometres long and thus the shorter and small headstream.

==== Morre ====
The 22-kilometre-long Morre, also called the Saubach in its Bavarian lower reaches, has its source on the edge of the village of Hettingen. It runs westwards through the borough of Buchen, bends towards the northwest and collects the Hollerbach. The Morre flows through Hettigenbeuern into Bavaria and reaches Zittenfelden. West of Schneeberg it the Morre unites with the Marsbach to form the Billbach.

=== Course ===
After the confluence of its headstreams, the Billbach crosses under the B 47 and flows through Amorbach. At the northwestern edge of the town it empties into the 25-kilometre-long Mud at the start of the B 469.
