= Vince Ebert =

German comedian, lecturer, presenter and author

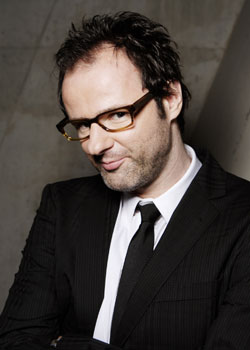
- Ebert in 2007
- Born: 23 May 1968 (age 57); Miltenberg, Germany
- Occupations: Comedian, lecturer, presenter and author
- Website: https://www.vince-ebert.de/

Vince Ebert (born 23 May 1968) is a German comedian, lecturer, presenter, author, and recipient of a degree in physics.

== Education, career, private life ==
Born in Miltenberg as Holger Ebert, Ebert grew up in Amorbach in Lower Franconia (Bavaria). Ebert's classmates gave him the name "Vince" when he was 14 years old because he was a fan of Vince Weber. After his military service with the Signal Corps, he studied physics at Julius Maximilian University in Würzburg from 1988 to 1994 and majored in experimental solid state physics and minored in astronomy. He earned his degree in physics in 1994.

Ebert worked from 1995 to 1997 as a consultant at the management consultancy Ogilvy & Mather Dataconsult in Frankfurt am Main. He discovered his talent for satirical revue while giving PowerPoint presentations. From 1997 to 2001 he worked as a strategic planner for the advertising agency Publicis in Frankfurt.

He is married to actress Valerie Bolzano. In 1994 he became Bavarian champion in beach volleyball.

== Satirical comedy ==
In 1998 Ebert made his first appearances as a comedian on various revue stages. He presented his first solo set Die jetzt aber wirklich große Show (Now A Really Great Show) in 2001 at the Neues Theater Höchst. He was discovered by Susanne Herbert, Eckart von Hirschhausen's. manager. Under the direction of Eckart von Hirschhausen, he created his first science satire program: "Urknaller – Physik ist sexy ("Big Bang – Physics is Sexy"). The premiere took place in 2004 at Frankfurt's "Käs". Although he is an atheist, he performed at the German Evangelical Church Assembly (Evangelischer Kirchentag) in Hamburg in 2013. Since September 2016 Ebert has been touring Germany, Austria and Switzerland with his seventh solo routine Zukunft is the Future (Future is Future). In 2014 he and Eric Mayer started a family-friendly science show "Schlau hoch 2 – Vince and Eric reisen zu den Sternen" ("Clever squared – Vince and Eric Travel to the Stars"). In his comic work he explores scientific concepts.

=== Solo programs ===
- 2001–2003: Die jetzt aber wirklich richtig große Show (Now A Really Great Show)
- 2003–2004: Alles gelogen (All Lies) (Director: Mathias Repiscus)
- 2004–2007: Urknaller – Physik ist sexy (Big Bang – Physics is Sexy) (Director: Eckart von Hirschhausen)
- 2007–2010: Denken lohnt sich (Thinking Pays Off) (Director: Eckart von Hirschhausen)
- 2011–2013: Freiheit ist alles (Freedom is Everything) (Director: Eckart von Hirschhausen)
- 2013–2016: Evolution (Director: Jim Libby)
- 2014–2016: Schlau hoch 2 – Vince und Eric reisen zu den Sternen (Clever squared – Vince and Eric Travel to the Stars) (with Eric Mayer)
- As of 2016: Zukunft is the Future (Future is Future) (Director: Jim Libby)
- As of 2018: Sexy Science (English Show, e.g. at Edinburgh Fringe)

== Events and shows ==
Ebert also moderates events such as the "Felix Burda Award", the "Brand Gala" and the annual ThyssenKrupp IdeenPark reception (co-moderated by Thomas Gottschalk). In his capacity as Keynote speaker, he gives lectures on scientific and economic topics, at the Alpensymposium, for example, or on Bühnen des Wissens (Sprecherhaus). Also in English since 2016.

== Television ==
Ebert appears in various Television shows such as Mitternachtsspitzen (WDR), TV total (ProSieben) and is also a regular guest on talk shows such as Markus Lanz (ZDF), the NDR Talkshow and the Kölner Treff (WDR). Between 2009 and 2011, Ebert appeared as a "guest lecturer" on the WDR show Der dritte Bildungsweg, which was moderated by Jürgen Becker during this time. In 2012, together with Eckart von Hirschhausen, he hosted a season.

Ebert has been hosting the show Wissen vor acht – Werkstatt ("Science Before Eight – Workshop") on ARD since 2011, where he explains interesting concepts in physics in less than three minutes.

== Published works ==
=== Literature ===
- 2008: Denken Sie selbst! Sonst tun es andere für Sie. (Think for yourself! Otherwise others will do it for you) Rowohlt Verlag, ISBN 978-3-499-62386-8
- 2011: Machen Sie sich frei! Sonst tut es keiner für Sie.(Free yourself! No one else will do it for you) Rowohlt Taschenbuchverlag, Reinbek bei Hamburg 2011, ISBN 978-3-499-62651-7.
- 2013: Bleiben Sie neugierig. (Stay curious) Rowohlt, ISBN 978-3-499-63043-9.
- 2016: Unberechenbar. Warum das Leben zu komplex ist, um es perfekt zu planen (Unpredictable. Why life is too complex to plan it perfectly) Rowohlt Polaris, Reinbek, ISBN 978-3-499-63112-2.

=== Audio ===
- 2003: Die jetzt aber wirklich richtig große Show (Now A Really Great Show) (Live recording of stage performance)
- 2005: Urknaller – Physik ist sexy (Big Bang – Physics is sexy) (Live recording of stage performance)
- 2008
  - Denken lohnt sich (Thinking Pays Off) (Eichborn Verlag, Live recording of stage performance)
  - Denken Sie selbst! Sonst tun es andere für Sie (Think for yourself! Otherwise others will do it for you) (Eichborn Verlag, Live Reading)
- 2011:
  - Freiheit ist alles (Freedom is Everything) (Eichborn Verlag, Live recording of stage performance)
  - Machen Sie sich frei! Sonst tut es keiner für Sie (Free yourself! No one else will do it for you) (der Hörverlag, Live-Reading)
- 2014: Unberechenbar (Unpredictable) (der Hörverlag, Live recording of stage performance)
- 2016: Unberechenbar (Unpredictable) (der Hörverlag, Live recording of stage performance)
- 2017: Zukunft ist the Future (Future is Future) (der Hörverlag, Live recording of stage performance), ISBN 978-3844526004

=== Columns ===
- 2007–2009: Frankfurter Neue Presse, weekly column Witzig und wahr
- 2008–2018: Absatzwirtschaft, Monthly column Marketing Life
- 2009–present: NovoArgumente
- 2009–2011: Frankfurter Rundschau, weekly Column Denken Sie selbst
- 2011–2012: Monthly column in Prinz Magazin
- 2013–present: guest contributions in Spektrum Neo
- 2013–2017: weekly column in Focus Magazin
- 2015–present: Blog Stiftung Rechnen
- 2016–present: Biweekly column on Spektrum.de

== Awards ==
- 1999: Bielefelder Kabarettpreis (Bielefeld Cabaret Prize)
- 2002: Kabarett Kaktus
- 2003: Bayerischer Kabarettpreis in the Categorie Senkrechtstarter (Bavarian Cabaret Prize, category: Shooting Star)
- 2007: Sprungbrett (Springboard) (Prize from the Handelsblatt))

== Philanthropy ==
Vince Ebert is a patron of the Galileum Solingen. Additionally he sponsors the Technoseum's "Jugend für Technik" (Youth for Technology) initiative in Mannheim. He is also an ambassador for the MINT Zukunft schaffen and for the Stiftung Rechnen which aims to impart basic mathematical and scientific knowledge.
