= Principality of Leiningen =

Central European principality, 1803–1806

Principality of Leiningen Fürstentum Leiningen
- 1803–1806
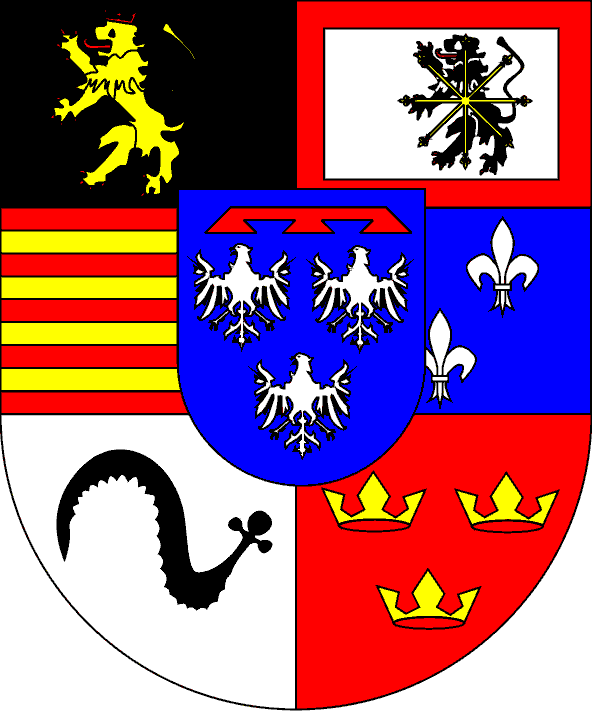
- Coat of arms

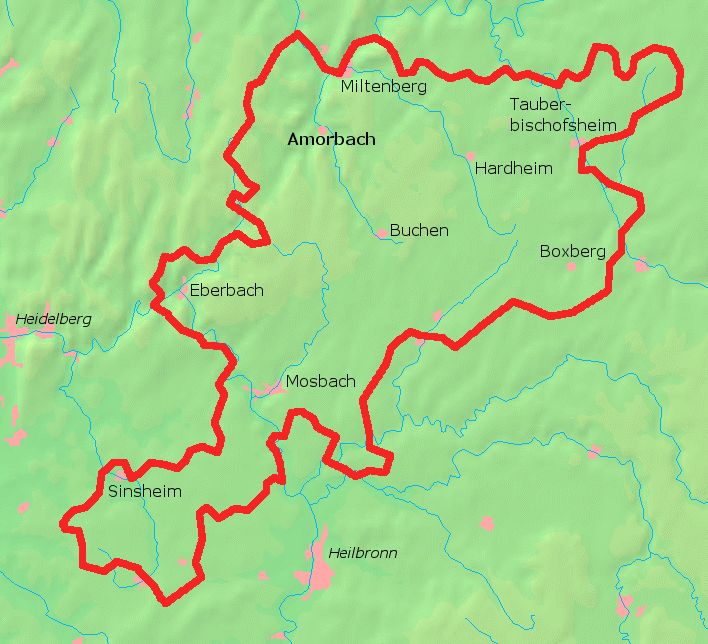
- Map of the Principality of Leiningen
- Status: State of the Holy Roman Empire
- Capital: Amorbach
- Government: Principality
- Historical era: Early modern period
  - Established: 1803
  - Mediatized to Baden: 1806
Preceded by	Succeeded by
Duchy of Swabia	Grand Duchy of Baden

The Principality of Leiningen (German: Fürstentum Leiningen) was a short-lived principality ruled by the Prince of Leiningen. It was created in 1803 as part of compensation for the House of Leiningen losing land to France but was mediatized three years later to become part of the Grand Duchy of Baden.

== History ==
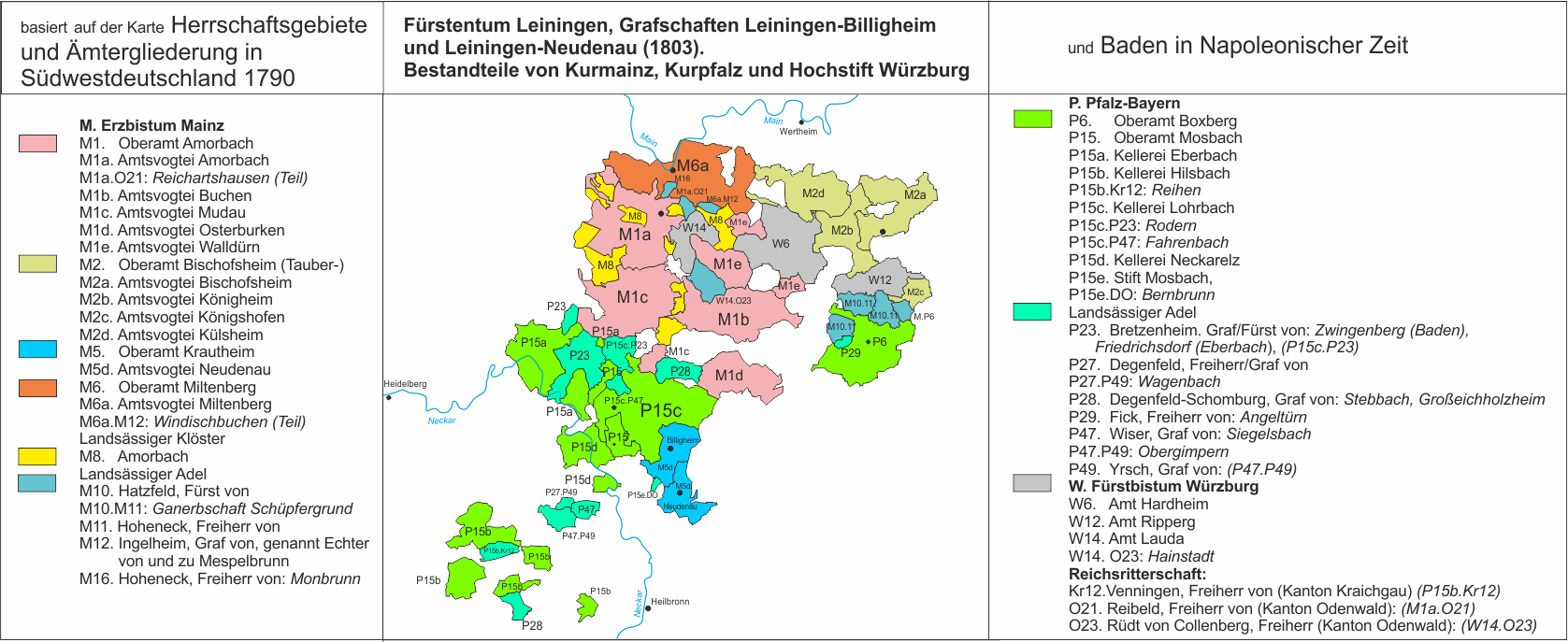
Map of the principality of Leiningen and the counties of Leiningen-Billigheim and Leiningen-Neudenau in 1803

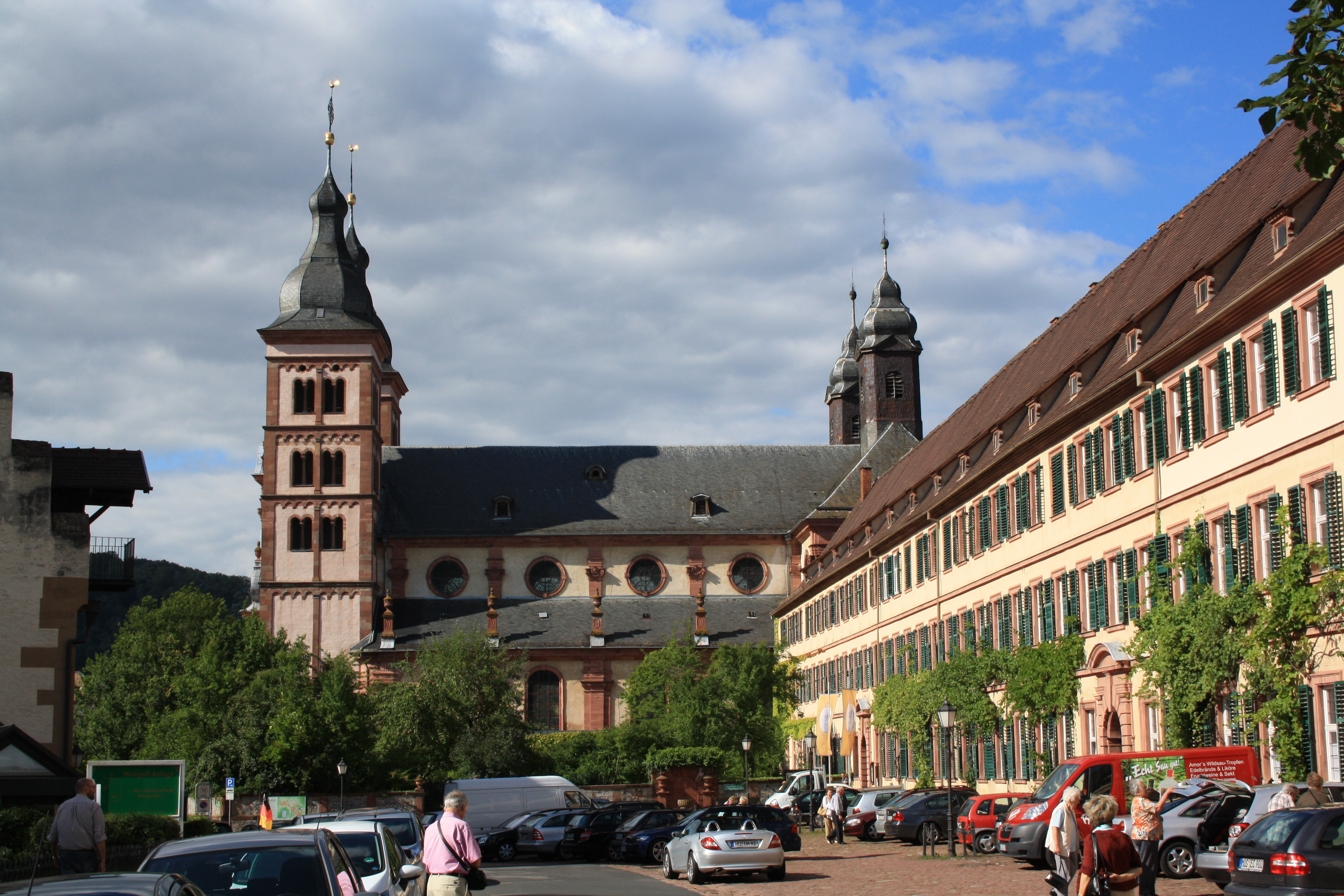
Amorbach Abbey

The principality emerged in 1803 in the course of secularization of ecclesiastical states in Germany. In 1779, Karl Friedrich Wilhelm, Count of Leiningen-Dagsburg-Hartenburg, was created a Prince of the Holy Roman Empire. In 1801, France seized his lands on the left bank of the Rhine, namely Dagsburg, Hardenburg, and Dürkheim. In 1803, he was compensated with the secularized Amorbach Abbey as a new Principality. The Principality was also given Adersbach and Rohrbach due to the collapse of the Electoral Palatinate.

The new sovereignty of Leiningen improved the economy of the included lands, with Carl Friedrich Wilhelm, 1st Prince of Leiningen engaging in a construction and road widening programme due to the economic boom. Three years later, in 1806, Leiningen was mediatized to become part of the Grand Duchy of Baden. The mediatization worsened the local economy; by 1808 the schoolmaster in Amorbach had to ask Prince Carl personally for firewood to heat the school and lock it away due to the risk of theft. Its territory is now included mainly in Baden-Württemberg, but partly in Bavaria and in Hesse. Amorbach Abbey is still today the family seat of the Prince of Leiningen.

== Bibliography ==
- Laurenz Hannibal Fischer: Die Verwaltungsverhältnisse des fürstlichen Hauses Leiningen, Amorbach 1828.
- Eva Kell: Das Fürstentum Leiningen. Umbruchserfahrungen einer Adelsherrschaft zur Zeit der Französischen Revolution. Kaiserslautern 1993.
- Sandra Schwab: Die Entschädigung des Hauses Leiningen durch den Reichsdeputationshauptschluß von 1803, Studienarbeit. GRIN Verlag für akademische Texte, BoD. Norderstedt 2007.
- Ingo Toussaint: Die Grafen von Leiningen: Studien zur leiningischen Genealogie und Territorialgeschichte bis zur Teilung von 1317/18. J. Thorbecke Verlag, 1982.
