= Amorbach =

- Town
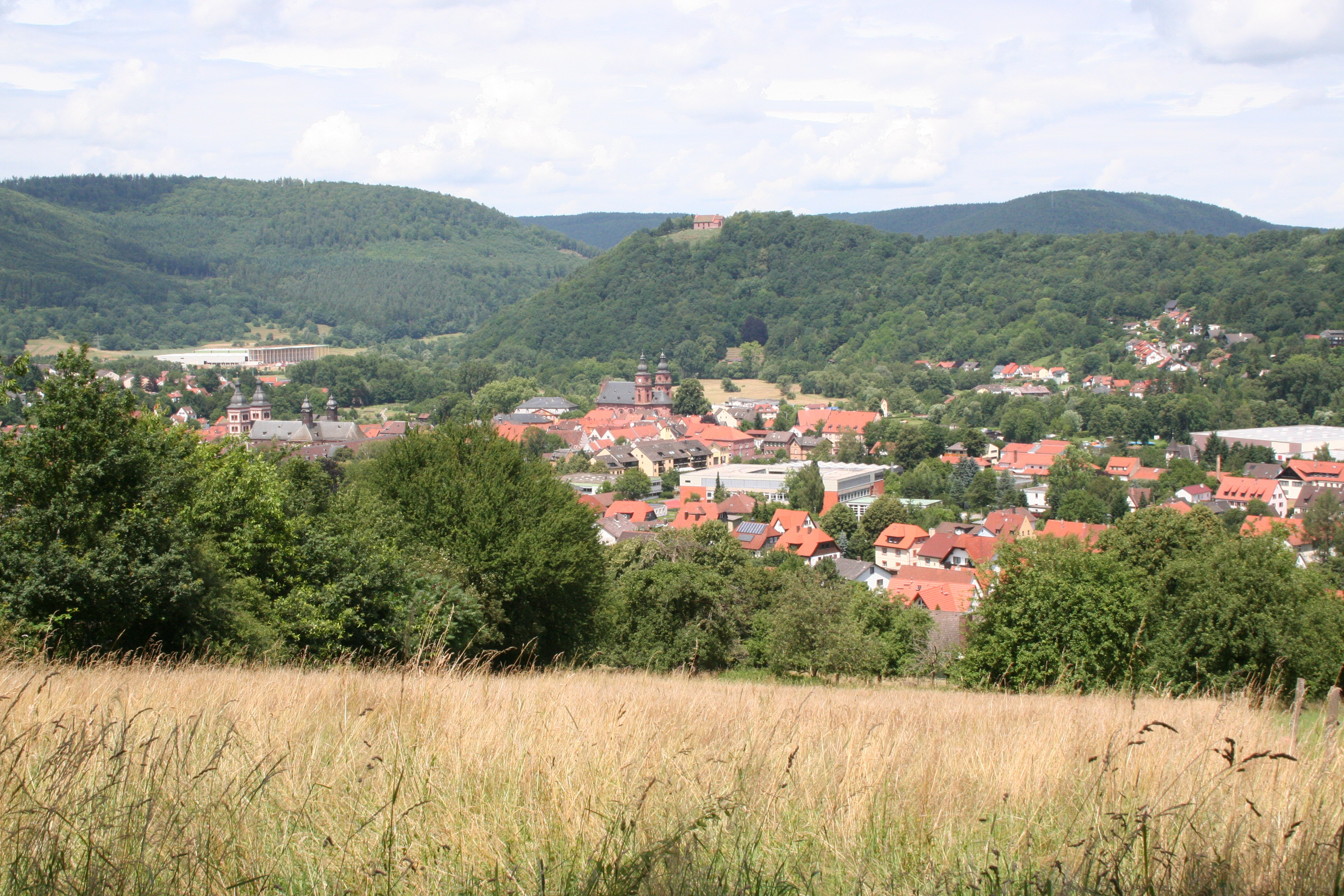
- View of Amorbach

- Coat of arms

- Location of Amorbach within Miltenberg district
- Interactive map of Amorbach
- Location within Germany Location within Bavaria
- Coordinates: 49°38′N 9°13′E
- Country: Germany
- State: Bavaria
- Admin. region: Unterfranken
- District: Miltenberg

Government
  - Mayor (2020–26): Peter Schmitt (CSU)

Area
  - Total: 50.9 km^{2} (19.7 sq mi)
- Elevation: 165 m (541 ft)

Population (2025-12-31)
  - Total: 3,911
  - Density: 76.8/km^{2} (199/sq mi)
- Time zone: UTC+01:00 (CET)
  - Summer (DST): UTC+02:00 (CEST)
- Postal codes: 63916
- Dialling codes: 09373
- Vehicle registration: MIL
- Website: amorbach.de

Amorbach (German: [ˈaːmoːɐ̯bax]) is a town in the Miltenberg district in the Regierungsbezirk of Lower Franconia (Unterfranken) in Bavaria, Germany, with around 4,000 inhabitants. It is situated on the small river Mud, in the northeastern part of the Odenwald.

== History ==
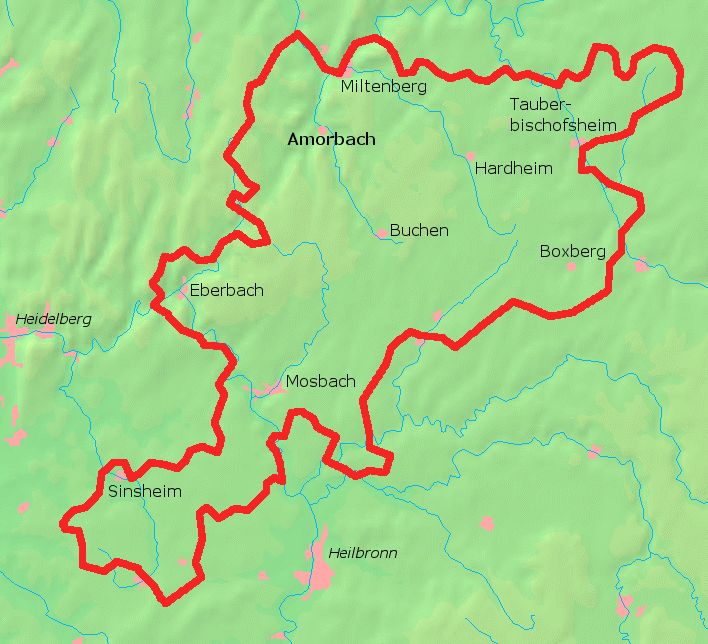
Map of the Principality of Leiningen

The town began as a Benedictine monastery (Amorbach Abbey or Kloster Amorbach), which bit by bit grew into a settlement until in 1253 it was raised to the status of a town. Over the years, the town changed hands several times. It was part of the Bishopric of Würzburg until 1656, when it became part of the Archbishopric of Mainz. As a result of the 1803 German Mediatisation the Archbishopric of Mainz was secularized, and Amorbach became the residence town of the short-lived Principality of Leiningen. Only in 1816 did it become part of the Kingdom of Bavaria. In 1965, Amorbach attained the status of a climatic spa (Luftkurort).

=== Amalgamations ===
The following settlements have been amalgamated with the town:

- 1 April 1973: Boxbrunn
- 1 January 1975: Beuchen
- 1 January 1976: Neudorf
- 1 January 1976: Reichartshausen

== Economy ==
Today Amorbach relies on the tourist business with its state recognition as a climatic spa (Luftkurort) and its many Baroque buildings.

Amorbach is the family seat of the princely Haus zu Leiningen. In 1992, the town was awarded the Europa Nostra Medal.

== Arts and culture ==
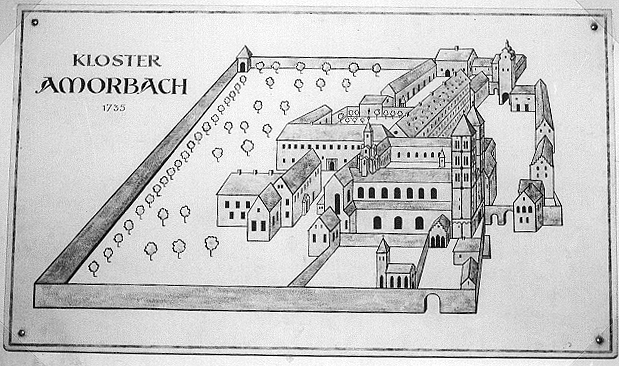
Possible appearance of Amorbach Abbey in 1735

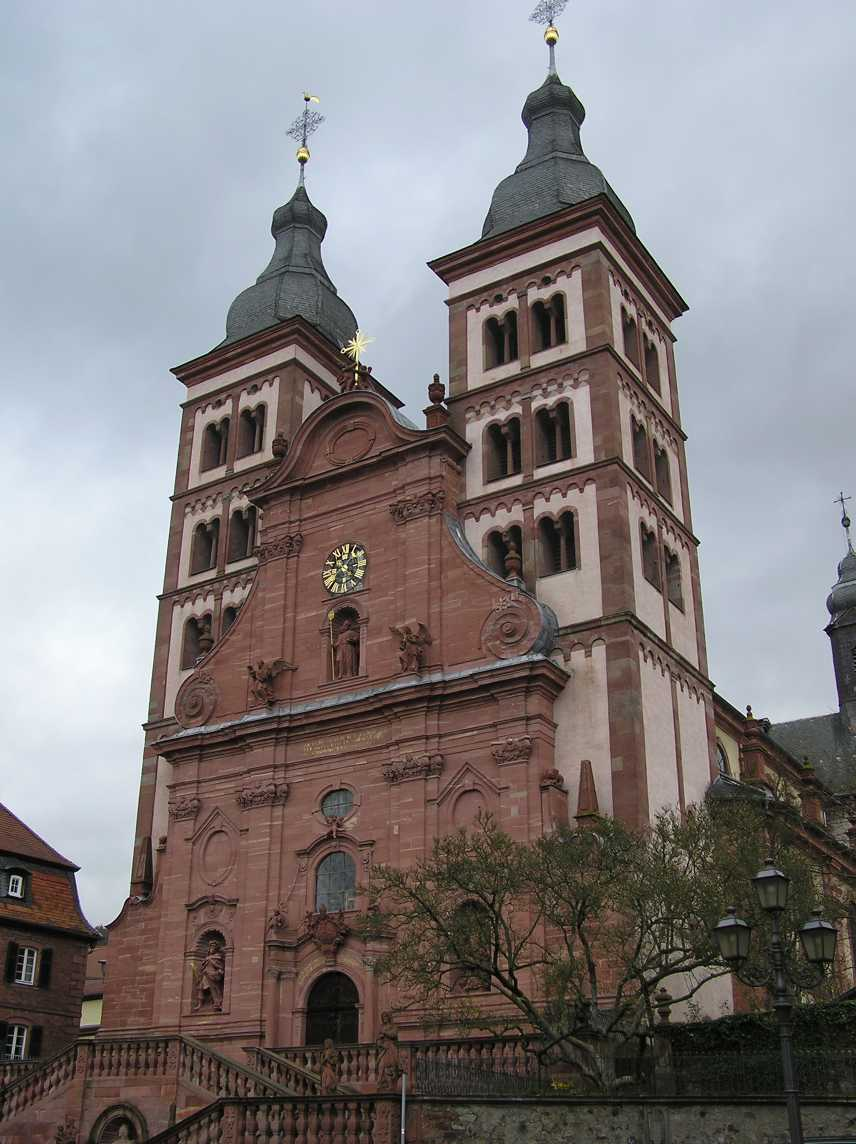
Abbey church

=== Abbey church ===
The Benedictine abbey, formerly owned by the princely Haus zu Leiningen with its library, and the abbey church with its Stumm organ draw thousands of visitors each year.

=== Parish church St. Gangolf ===
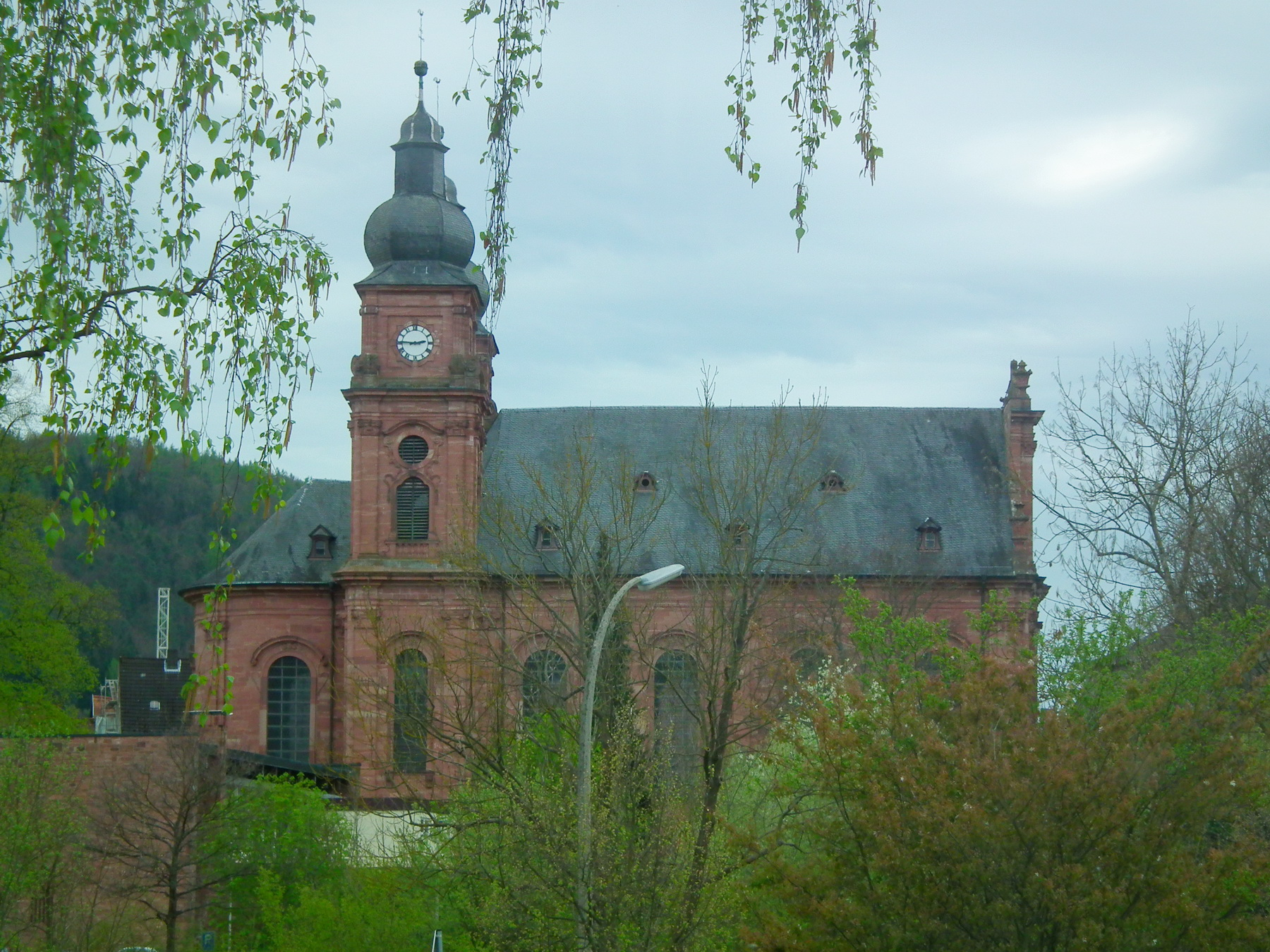
St. Gangolf

The late-Baroque hall church St. Gangolf replaced an earlier one, St. Gangolf and St. Sebastian, documented for 1182. It was built in 1751-3 by local Oberamtmann Johann Franz Wolfgang Damian von Ostein and his brother and Archbishop, Johann Friedrich Karl von Ostein. The design was based on plans by Anselm Franz von Ritter zu Groenesteyn, building work was supervised by his apprentice Alexander Jakob Schmidt. The design was inspired by St. Peter's Church at Mainz. The interior reflects Rococo style and the onset of the Neoclassical style. Ceiling frescoes by Johannes Zick show the lives of St. Gangolf (Gangulphus) and Saint Sebastian as well as King David as the "father" of Solomon's Temple. Oil paintings in the choir by Konrad Huber depict the legendary beginnings of Amorbach. The marble high altar was made by Georg Schrantz, while Josef Keilwerth added the four statues. The cross by J.B. Berg dates from 1808. The side altars (1720) were originally used in the predecessor building. The organ also dates from 1720, but was located at Neustadt am Main Abbey until 1806, when it was bought by the Amorbach parish. The church has two pulpits, made from stucco by Antonio Rossi.

St. Gangolf is the Catholic parish church of Amorbach.

=== Museums ===
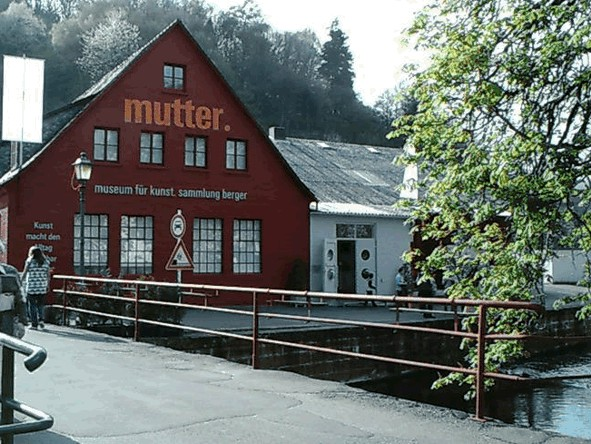
Berger Collection with teapot museum

The Sammlung Berger mit Teekannenmuseum is a museum of art and teapots. Besides impressive exhibits of modern art by Arman, Michael Buthe, Chagall, Christo, Keith Haring, Otto Reichart, Rebecca Horn, Yves Klein, Roy Lichtenstein, Nam June Paik, Niki de Saint-Phalle, H. A. Schult, Daniel Spoerri, Ben Vautier, Dick Higgins and others, the museum also shows a teapot collection of 2,467 teapots from throughout the world and roughly 500 miniature teapots.

=== Tithe barn ===
The tithe barn in Amorbach, built in 1488, has for five hundred years played a central role in the town. Originally built to store tithes in the form of produce for the prince, it was – after extensive remodelling in the 1960s – run as a cinema.

The Kulturkreis Zehntscheuer Amorbach e.V. (“Amorbach Tithe Barn Cultural Circle”), which outfitted the building in 1991 as a cabaret theatre maintains and renovates the building, which stands in the historical town centre. In 2001, this club bought the tithe barn.

=== Regular events ===
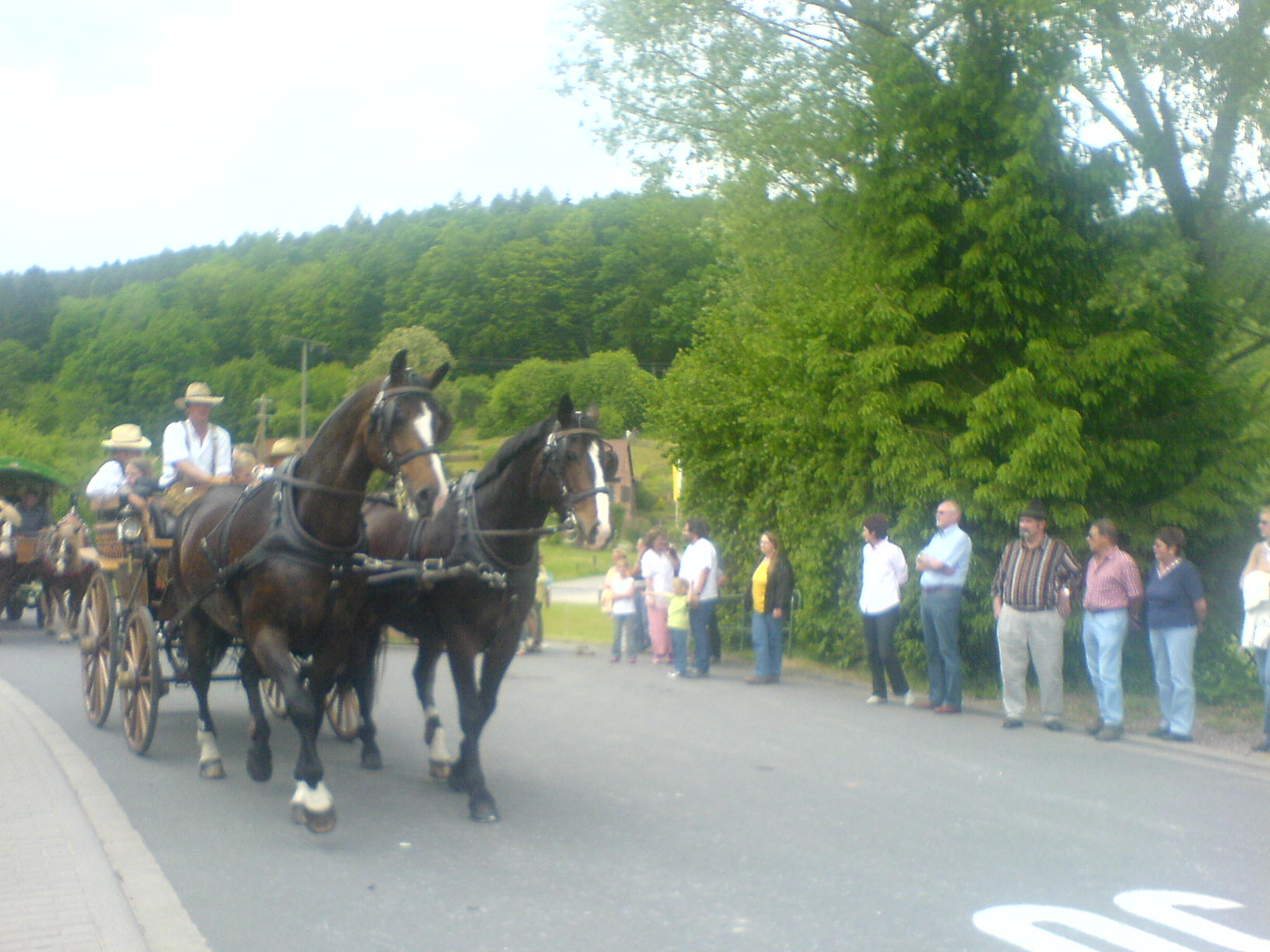
The yearly Mother’s Day Gangolfsritt

- Amorbach Abbey Concerts in the former Benedictine abbey church
- Cabaret programme at the cabaret theatre Zehntscheuer Amorbach
- Daily at 12:00 and 15:00, the Stumm organ (1782) with its 5,116 pipes is played
- Each year on Mother’s Day, the so-called Gangolfsritt (“Gangulphus’s Ride”), a procession of horses through the town, takes place.

== Infrastructure ==
=== Transport ===
In Amorbach, Bundesstraße 469 meets Bundesstraße 47. The railway station lies on the Seckach−Miltenberg railway line (KBS 709), also known as the Madonnenlandbahn.

== Education ==
- Karl-Ernst-Gymnasium Amorbach
- Theresia-Gerhardinger-Realschule;
- Parzival-Hauptschule;
- Wolfram-von-Eschenbach-Grundschule (primary school).

== Notable people ==
=== Sons and daughters of the town ===
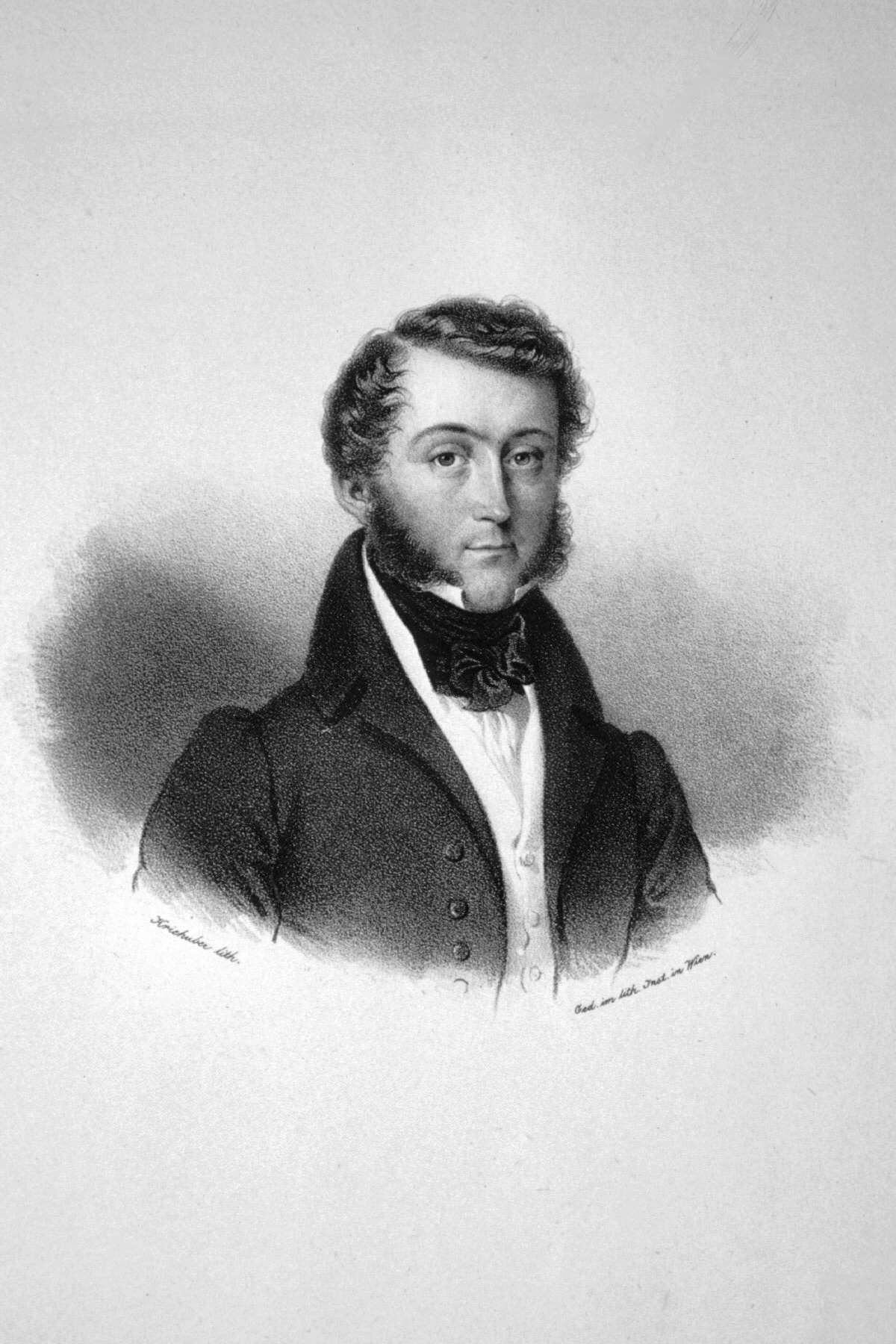
Karl zu Leiningen (c. 1835)

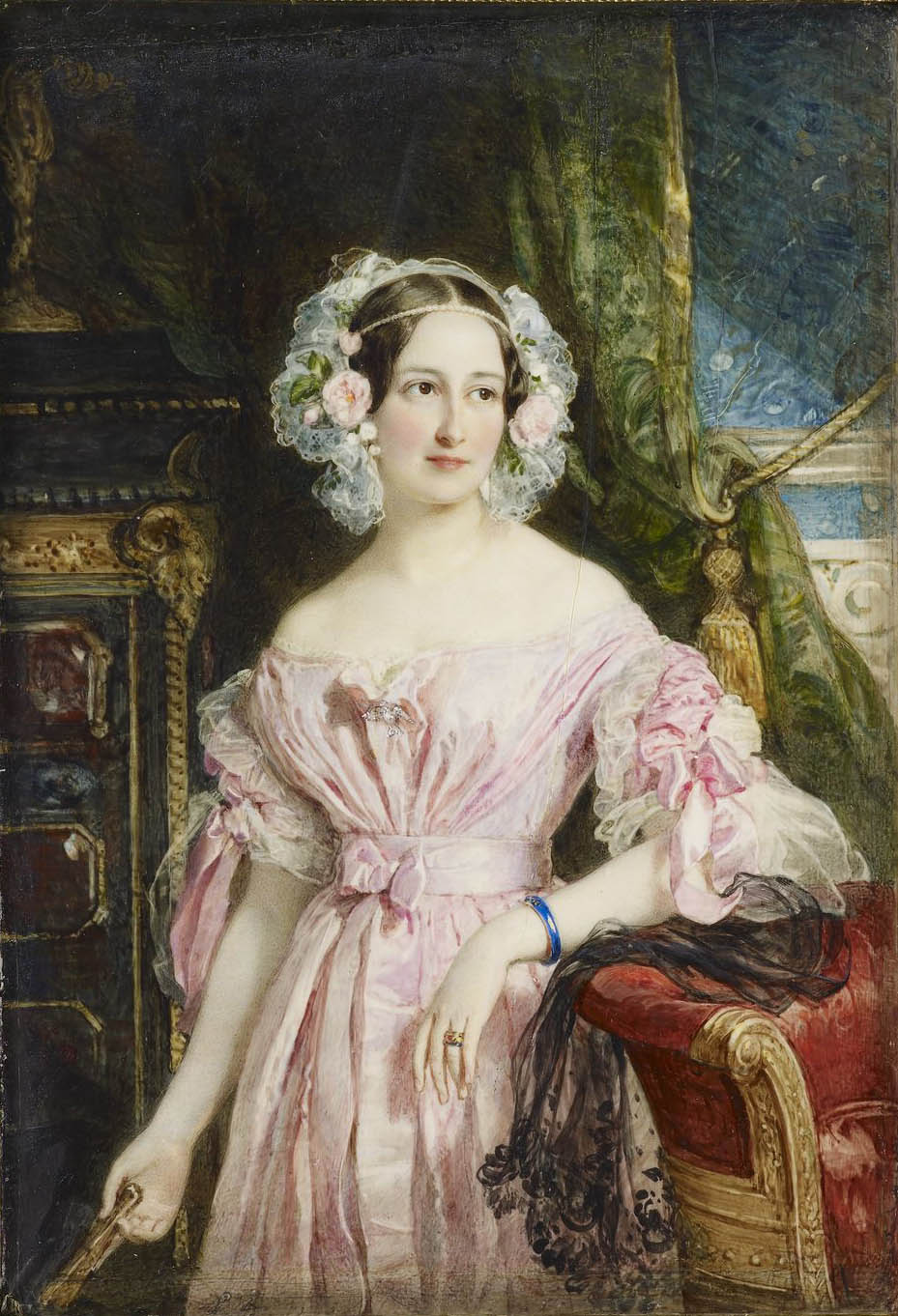
Princess Feodora of Hohenlohe-Langenburg (1838)

- Johann Amerbach, (c. 1440-1513), printer and publisher in printing’s early days;
- Stephan Alexander Würdtwein (1722-1796), Auxiliary Bishop of Worms, historian;
- Karl Haßloch (1769–1829), stage actor and operatic singer;
- Carl, 3rd Prince of Leiningen (1804-1856); elder half-brother of Queen Victoria.
- Princess Feodora of Leiningen (1807-1872); elder half-sister of Queen Victoria.
- Franz Joseph von Stein, (1832-1909), Bishop of Würzburg (1879–98) and Archbishop of Munich and Freising (1898–1909);
- Karl von Tubeuf, (1862-1941), German phytopathologist (1902–33 professor in Munich);
- Georg Stang (1880-1951), Bavarian politician and president of the Bavarian State Parliament
- Ernst Leopold, 4th Prince of Leiningen (1886-1939); son of the 3rd Prince of Leiningen.
- Oskar Martin-Amorbach, (1897-1987), painter and professor in Munich and Berlin;
- Klemens Schnorr (1949-), German organist and musical scientist;
- Vince Ebert (1968-), scientist-cabaret performer and writer;
- Philipp Weber (1974-), cabaret performer and writer;

=== Died in Amorbach ===
- Carl Friedrich Wilhelm, 1st Prince of Leiningen (1724-1807);
- Emich Carl, 2nd Prince of Leiningen (1763-1814); first husband of Princess Victoria of Saxe-Coburg-Saalfeld, mother of Queen Victoria; he was the father of Queen Victoria's elder half-siblings, Carl, 3rd Prince of Leiningen and Princess Feodora of Leiningen.
- Princess Victoria Melita of Saxe-Coburg and Gotha (1876–1936); granddaughter of Queen Victoria through her son Alfred, Duke of Saxe-Coburg and Gotha and his wife, Grand Duchess Maria Alexandrovna of Russia.
