= Amorbach Abbey =

- Kloster Amorbach
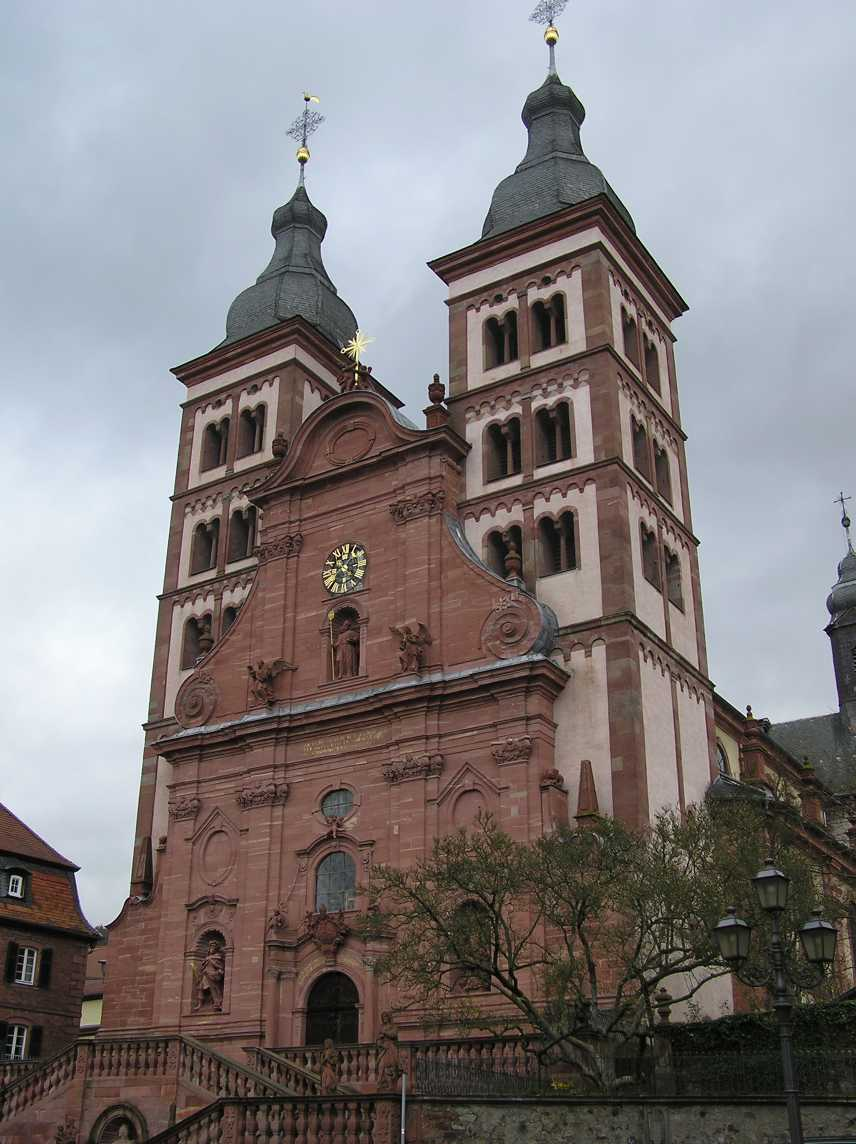
- Amorbach Abbey church

- Location within Bavaria Location within Germany

Monastery information
- Order: Benedictines
- Established: 8th century
- Disestablished: 1803

Architecture
- Style: Baroque/Rococo

Site
- Location: Amorbach, Germany
- Coordinates: 49°38′34″N 9°13′12″E
- Public access: partial

Amorbach Abbey (German: Kloster Amorbach) was a Benedictine imperial abbey of the Holy Roman Empire located at Amorbach. It was later the residence of the rulers of the short-lived Principality of Leiningen, before that became part of the Kingdom of Bavaria, and its historic buildings still belong to the princely family.

The abbey is now in the district of Miltenberg in Lower Franconia, Bavaria, Germany.

== History ==
The abbey was one of four Carolingian foundations intended to establish Christianity in the region of the Odenwald (the others being the monasteries of Lorsch, Fulda, and Mosbach).

According to legend, a Gaugraf named Ruthard called the Frankish bishop Saint Pirmin to the area to set up a monastic settlement west of today's town, at the entrance to the Otterbachtal. A disciple of Pirmin, an Aquitanian called Saint Amor (the namesake of the abbey and town as its first abbot) is reported to have moved the monastery to its current location in 734 AD. The patrons were the Virgin Mary, with Saints Simplicius, Faustinus and Beatrix.

By 800 it had become a Reichsabtei, the abbot being directly answerable to Charlemagne. Pepin united it to the Bishopric of Würzburg, although control of it was much disputed by the Bishops of Mainz.

The abbey played an important role in the clearing and settlement of the vast tracts of forest in which it was located, and in the evangelisation of other areas, notably Saxony: many of the abbots of the missionary centre of Verden an der Aller - later to become the Bishops of Verden - had previously been monks at Amorbach. It was severely damaged by the invasions of the Hungarians in the 10th century.

In 1446, the priest Johannes Keck brought reliquaries of Saint Amor and Saint Landrada from Münsterbilsen near Maastricht to the church Amorbrunn, which started to attract pilgrims. In particular after the end of the Thirty Years' War in 1648, people came in search of help for childlessness.

In 1525 the abbey buildings were stormed and plundered during the German Peasants' War by forces under the command of Götz von Berlichingen. During the Thirty Years' War the abbey was attacked by the Swedes in 1632, was dissolved for a short time between 1632 and 1634 and the lands taken by a local landowner, and although it was afterwards restored and the lands regained, there followed a period of decline and poverty.

In 1656 the Bishops of Mainz and Würzburg reached agreement: Amorbach was transferred into the control, both spiritual and territorial, of the Archbishop of Mainz, and significant building works followed.

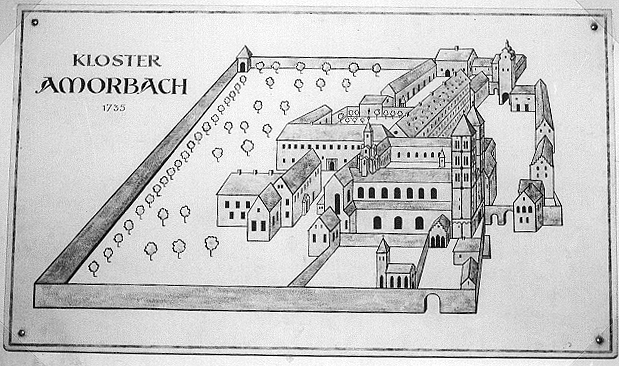
Likely appearance of the abbey, c. 1735

In the 1740s the site was completely refurbished in the late Baroque/early Rococo style, of which it remains a significant example, under the supervision of Maximilian von Welsch. From 1742 to 1744 the Abteikirche was built, incorporating the two six-storied west towers (12th century). Further extensive construction and decoration was undertaken in the 1780s, including in 1782 the installation of what was at the time the biggest organ in the world.

== Dissolution ==
The abbey was finally dissolved in 1803 and given with its lands to the Princes of Leiningen as compensation for lost territories occupied in 1793 by French revolutionary troops. In 1803, Princess Victoria of Saxe-Coburg-Saalfeld married Emich Karl, Prince of Leiningen. The couple had two children. The prince died in 1814. In May 1818, the widowed Princess of Leiningen married Prince Edward, Duke of Kent and Strathearn. They resided at Amorbach until April 1819, returning to England so that their daughter, the future Queen Victoria would be born on British soil.

Until 1806, a separate Principality of Leiningen (Fürstentum Leiningen) with the Ämter of Mosbach, Buchen, Ostburken, Königsheim, and Grünfeld, was based on Amorbach. The princes left the abbey church to the (Protestant) parish and converted the other monastic buildings into a Residenz.

Jurisdiction over the abbey and its territories passed to the government of the Kingdom of Bavaria in 1816.

== Description ==
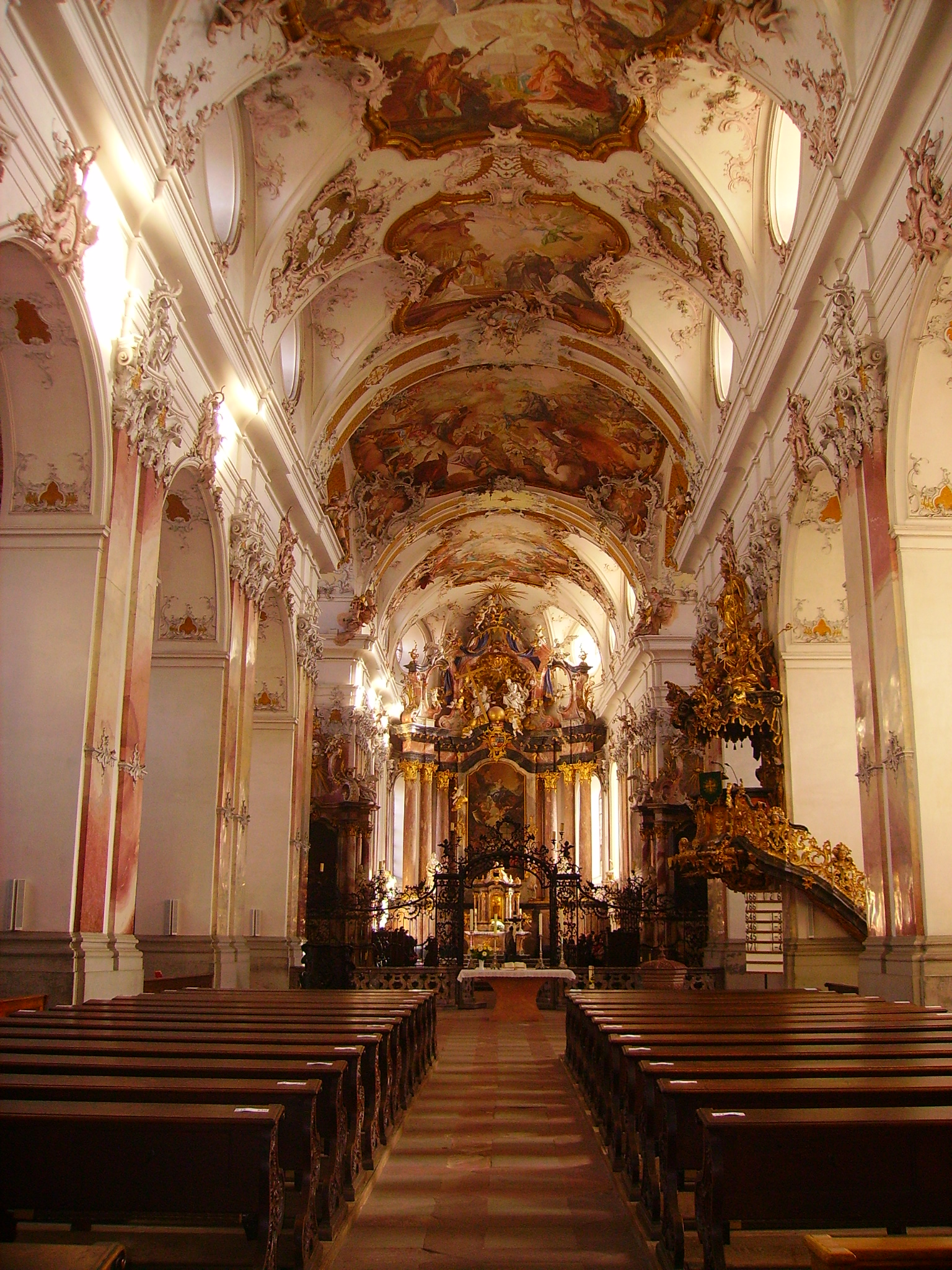
Interior of the abbey church

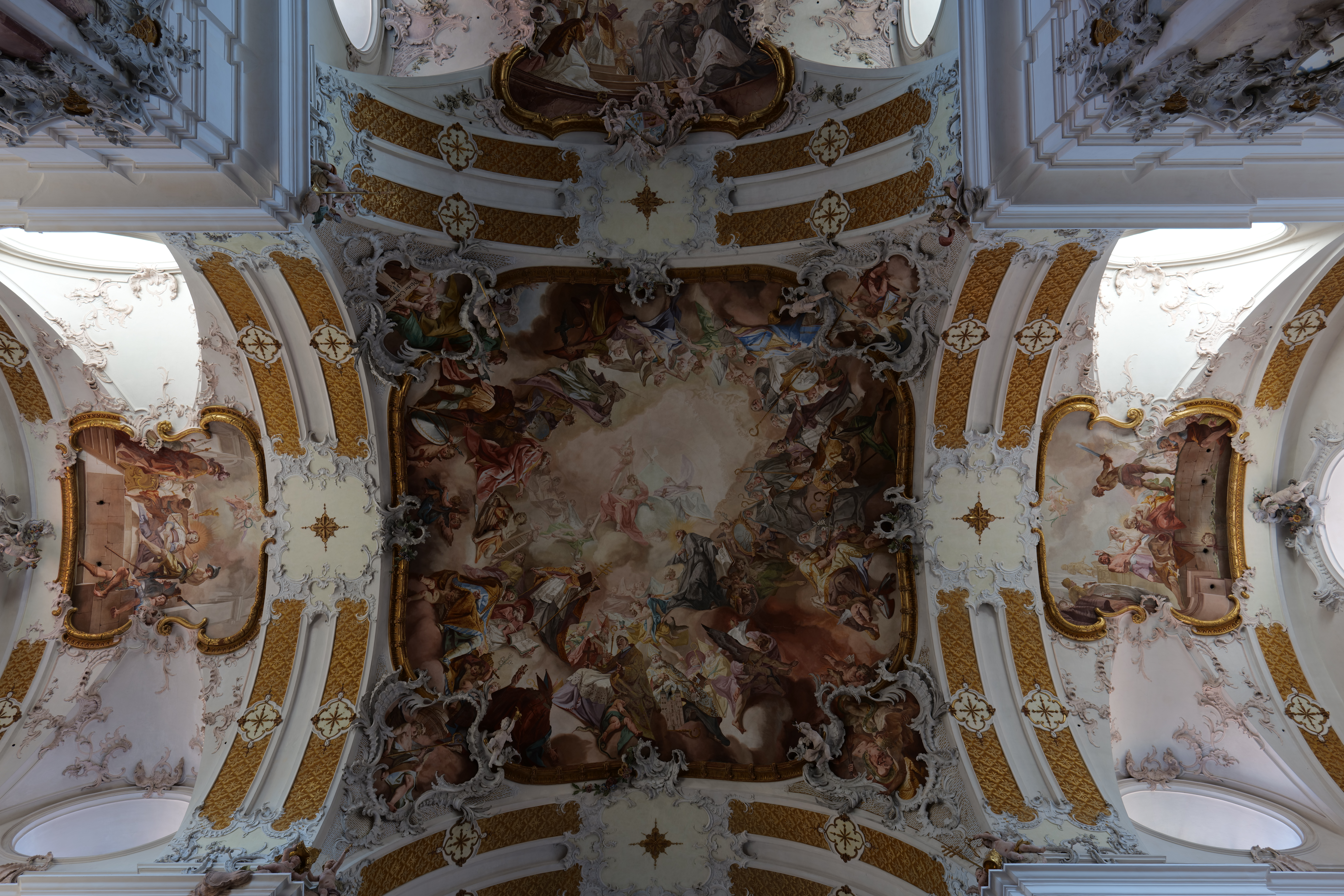
Interior ceiling of the abbey church

=== Abbey church ===
Welsch put a massive façade made from Buntsandstein before the Romanesque towers, on the pediment he placed a statue of Saint Benedict. The elevated main portal is reached by two large stairs with railings ornamented with statues of Jesus, Mary, Zechariah, Elisabeth, Joachim and Anne. A niche in the wall holds a figure of Saint Beatrix.

The interior features stucco work and frescoes in late Baroque/early Rococo style by members of the Wessobrunner School. The main painter was Matthäus Günther. The story of Saint Benedict features prominently in the frescoes.

The side aisles contain altars dedicated to Saint Joseph, Magdalena, Agnes and others. One of them is dedicated to the Bishops of Verden Suitbert, Patto and Issinger, who were monks from Amorbach according to the Verden chronicles.

The high altar has six red marble columns supporting black beams topped by a Holy Trinity. Günther's main altar picture shows the arrival of Mary in Heaven, flanked by life-sized statues of her parents, Joachim and Anne. The stucco-workers who made the ceiling above also added the altars in the northern and southern transept in 1747.

The choir screen from wrought iron was made in 1748-50 by Marx Gattinger from Würzburg, who had also worked with Oegg on the fence in front of the Würzburg Residence. The gold-covered pulpit, by Johann Wolfgang van der Auvera, from 1749 is already more Rococo than Baroque.

==== Organ ====
An important feature of the church is its Stumm organ. It was built in 1776–82, by Johann Philipp Stumm (1705–1776) and Johann Heinrich Stumm (1715–1788) of the organ-building Stumm family.

In their work at Amorbach, this style and Klangideal ("sound-ideal"), a synthesis of Southern German and French organ building, could be thoroughly realized. The work's original sound-producing hardware remained unchanged for more than two centuries. In the final years of the 19th century and on into the early 20th century, a number of further organ stops were added according to the preferences of the time.

Behind the organ's 16-field façade with its 124 sounding and up to seven-metre-tall organ pipes are found several ranks of pipes in their original configuration and piping on the slider chest, reconstructed in 1982. All 14 pedal ranks are freestanding behind it. Furthermore, also standing there, in three levels, is the swell box, added in 1982, along with its attendant works. It contains an assembly of ranks added after 1868, with one dedicated to the sound of French Romantic organ music. The organ has 5,116 pipes and 30 percussion devices shared across 66 stops, and is played from four manuals and one pedalboard.

=== Residence buildings ===
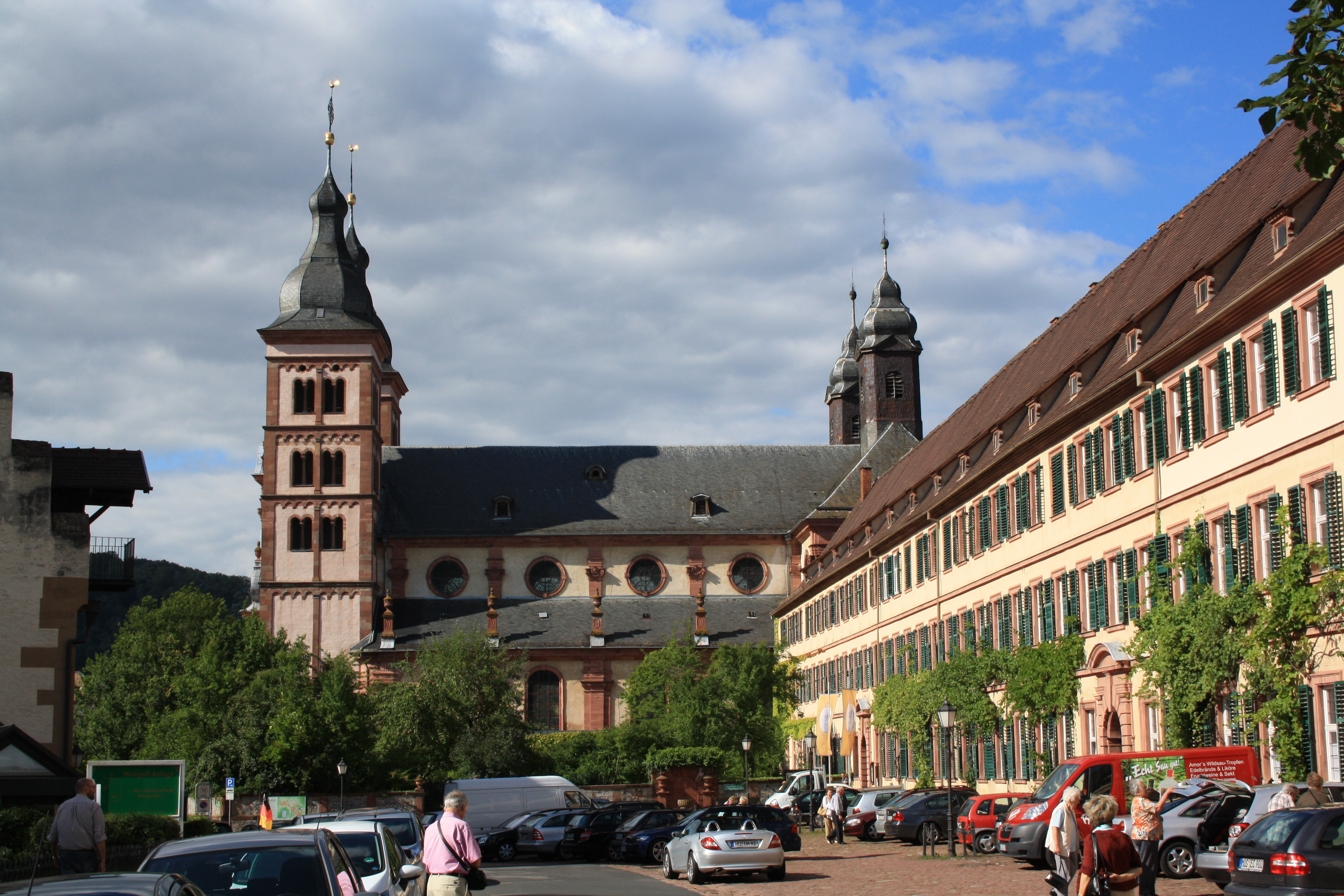
Amorbach Abbey

Rooms in the residence include the Green Hall, in Neoclassical style, which is used as a concert hall. The library is a two-storied room with a gallery. It contains the abbey library from 1790 in addition to the collection of the Princes of Leiningen. The stairway- and gallery-railings were made by J.B. Berg in 1797/8. The ceiling fresco by Conrad Huber (1798) shows allegories of wisdom, virtue and science.

== See also ==
- List of Carolingian monasteries
