= Mud (river) =

River in Germany

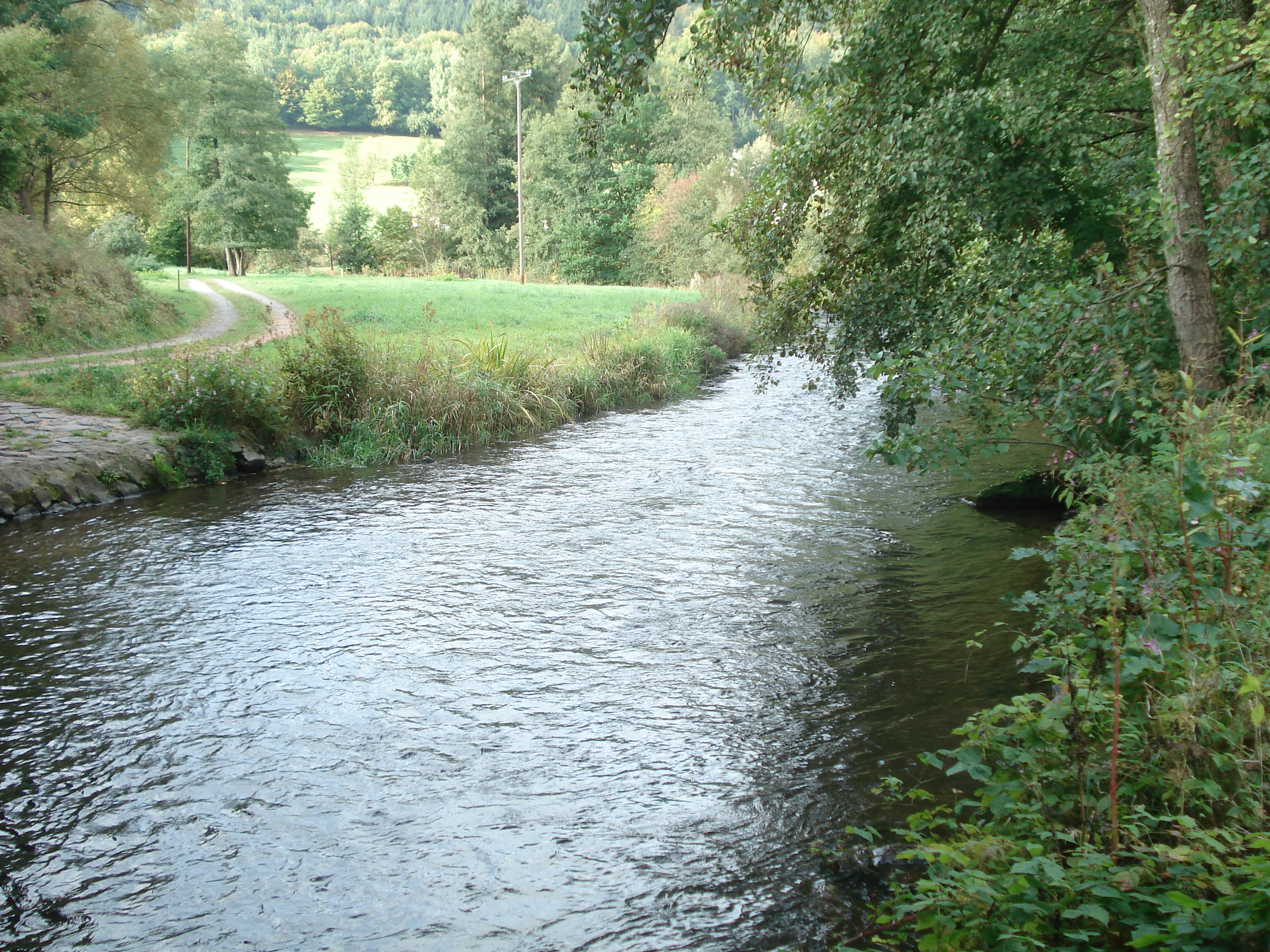

Location
- Country: Germany
- State: Baden-Württemberg, Bavaria

Physical characteristics
- Mouth
  - location: Main
  - coordinates: 49.7063°N 9.2380°E
- Length: 25.1 km (15.6 mi)
- Basin size: 409 km^{2} (158 sq mi)

Basin features
- Progression: Main→ Rhine→ North Sea
- Tributaries
  - right: Billbach

The Mud is a river of Baden-Württemberg and Bavaria, Germany. It flows into the river Main near Miltenberg.

== See also ==
- List of rivers of Baden-Württemberg
