= Schneeberg, Bavaria =

Schneeberg
- Municipality
- Coat of arms

- Location of Schneeberg within Miltenberg district
- Interactive map of Schneeberg
- Location within Germany Location within Bavaria
- Coordinates: 49°38′22″N 09°14′49″E
- Country: Germany
- State: Bavaria
- Admin. region: Unterfranken
- District: Miltenberg

Government
  - Mayor (2020–26): Kurt Repp (CSU)

Area
  - Total: 16.59 km^{2} (6.41 sq mi)
- Elevation: 168 m (551 ft)

Population (2025-12-31)
  - Total: 1,748
  - Density: 105.4/km^{2} (272.9/sq mi)
- Time zone: UTC+01:00 (CET)
  - Summer (DST): UTC+02:00 (CEST)
- Postal codes: 63936
- Dialling codes: 09373
- Vehicle registration: MIL
- Website: www.schneeberg-odenwald.de

Schneeberg (German pronunciation: [ˈʃneːbɛʁk]) is a market municipality in the Miltenberg district in the Regierungsbezirk of Lower Franconia (Unterfranken) in Bavaria, Germany.

== Geography ==
=== Location ===
Schneeberg lies in the Bavarian Lower Main (Bayerischer Untermain) Region.

The municipality has the following Gemarkungen (traditional rural cadastral areas): Hambrunn, Schneeberg, Zittenfelden.

== History ==
Schneeberg belonged to the Grand Duchy of Hesse-Darmstadt. After the Treaty of Munich in 1816 the place belonged to Bavaria. The Electoral Mainz community was assigned in the 1803 Reichsdeputationshauptschluss to the Princes of Leiningen, was mediatized in 1806 by Baden, and in 1810 was ceded to Hesse-Darmstadt. In the Hesse-Bavaria Rezeß (Frankfurt 1816), it finally passed to Bavaria. In the course of administrative reform in Bavaria, the current municipality came into being with the Gemeindeedikt (“Municipal Edict”) of 1818.

=== Population development ===
Within town limits, 1,754 inhabitants were counted in 1970, 1,822 in 1987 and in 2000 1,904.

On 1 January 2006, a figure of 2,009 inhabitants was reported, who represented 17 nationalities, while 1,931 of them were German nationals.

== Politics ==
=== Mayor ===
The mayor is Kurt Repp (CSU).

=== Town council ===
The council is made up of 12 council members with seats apportioned thus (Election 2020):

- CSU – 5
- Freie Wähler – 5
- Social Democratic Party of Germany – 2

Municipal taxes in 1999 amounted to €825,000 (converted), of which net business taxes amounted to €82,000.

=== Coat of arms ===
The municipality’s arms might be described thus: Per pale gules a fleur-de-lis argent banded by a crown Or, argent in base a mount of three issuant from which a coniferous tree vert.

The mount of three (a charge called a Dreiberg in German) and the tree symbolize the municipality’s location in the Odenwald (range). The mount itself is also canting for the name element —berg. The lily and the crown are Marian symbols and refer to the pilgrimage known to have been undertaken before 1474 to the “Mother of God on the Elder Trunk” (Muttergottes auf dem Holderstock), the legend underlying which tells of an icon that somehow mysteriously and repeatedly moved from its place in the church to a place on an elder tree.

The arms have been borne since 1968.

== Economy and infrastructure ==
According to official statistics, there were 263 workers on the social welfare contribution rolls working in producing businesses in 1998. In trade and transport this was 0. In other areas, 784 such workers worked from home. There was 1 processing business and 1 construction business, and furthermore, in 1999, there were 18 agricultural operations with a working area of 326 ha, of which 247 ha was meadowland.

=== Transport ===
The railway station lies on the Seckach-Miltenberg line (KBS 709), also called the Madonnenlandbahn.

=== Education ===
In 1999 the following institutions existed in :

- Kindergartens: 73 places with 74 children

== Notable people ==
- Alfred Pfaff (b. 16 July 1926 in Frankfurt-Rödelheim, d. 27 December 2008 in Erlenbach am Main) was a former German footballer and world champion in 1954. He lived from 1961 until his death in 2008 as a hotelier in the outlying centre of Zittenfelden.
- Bodo Kuhn (b. 9 August 1967 in Miltenberg) took part in the 1988 Summer Olympics in Seoul. He won a bronze medal in the men’s 4 × 400 m relay (starting in the heats, not in the final)
