= Princess Victoria Feodora Reuss =

German princess and nurse

- Duchess Adolf Friedrich of Mecklenburg-Schwerin
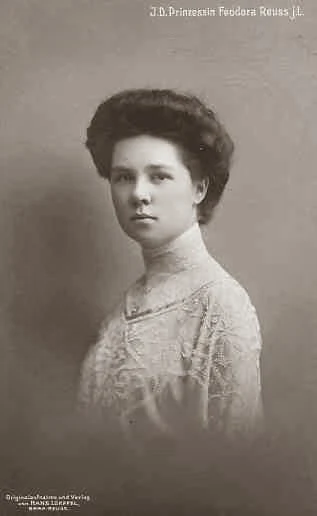
- Born: 21 April 1889; Potsdam, Kingdom of Prussia
- Died: 18 December 1918 (aged 29); Rostock, Germany
- Burial: Doberan Minster
- Spouses: Duke Adolf Friedrich of Mecklenburg (m. 1917)
- Issue: Duchess Woizlawa Feodora of Mecklenburg
Names
- Victoria Feodora Agnes Leopoldine Elisabeth
- House: House of Reuss
- Father: Heinrich XXVII, Prince Reuss Younger Line
- Mother: Princess Elise of Hohenlohe-Langenburg

Princess Viktoria Feodora Reuss (German: Viktoria Feodora Prinzessin Reuß jüngere Linie; 21 April 1889 – 18 December 1918) was a German noblewoman and a member of the House of Reuss. By marriage to Duke Adolf Friedrich of Mecklenburg, she became a Duchess of Mecklenburg-Schwerin. She was named in honour of the German Empress Auguste Viktoria.

== Life and wartime service ==
Princess Viktoria Feodora was born in Potsdam, the eldest child of Heinrich XXVII, Prince Reuss Younger Line and Princess Elise of Hohenlohe-Langenburg. Her mother was a granddaughter of Princess Feodora of Leiningen, the half-sister of Queen Victoria.

During the First World War, she was distinguished for her humanitarian work. She voluntarily served as an assistant nurse in a military hospital in Gera, caring for wounded soldiers with exemplary dedication. Contemporaries described her as being "distinguished by all the virtues of beautiful humanity."

== Marriage and death ==
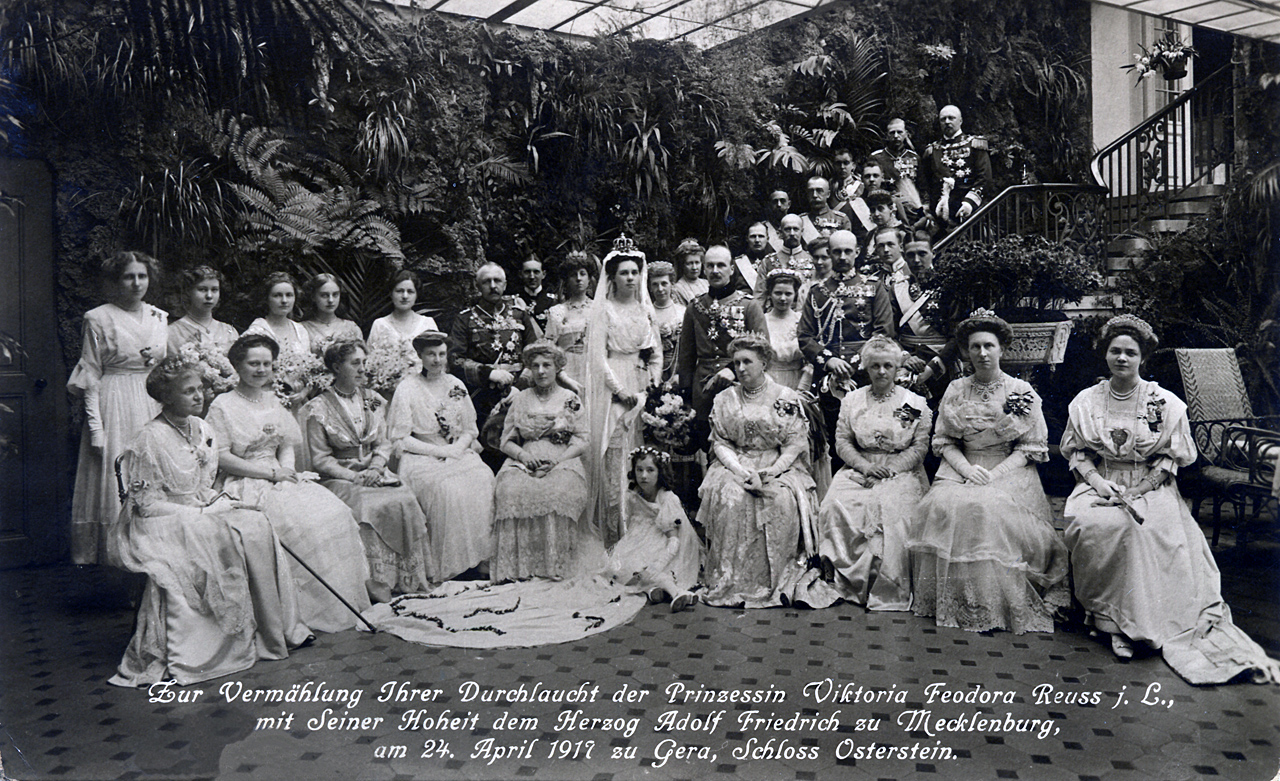
The wedding of Princess Viktoria Feodora Reuss and Duke Adolf Friedrich of Mecklenburg-Schwerin, 1917

On 24 April 1917, she married Duke Adolf Friedrich of Mecklenburg at Schloss Osterstein in Gera. The wedding was kept small due to the ongoing war. Following the marriage, the couple moved into the Grand Ducal Palace in Rostock.

Together, they had only child:

- Duchess Woizlawa Feodora of Mecklenburg (17 December 1918 – 3 June 2018). She married Heinrich I Prinz Reuss (1910-1982) the eldest son of Prince Heinrich XXXIV Reuss of Schleiz (1887-1956) and his wife and cousin, Princess Sophie Renata Reuss of Köstritz (1884-1968) and had issue

Tragically, Viktoria Feodora one day after giving birth to her only child, Duchess Woizlawa Feodora of Mecklenburg. She was interred in the Doberan Minster. Her husband later remarried her sister-in-law, Princess Elisabeth of Stolberg-Rossla, in 1924.

== Ancestry ==
Ancestors of Princess Victoria Feodora Reuss

8. Heinrich LXVII, Prince Reuss Younger Line
4. Heinrich XIV, Prince Reuss Younger Line
9. Princess Adelaide Reuss of Ebersdorf
2. Heinrich XXVII, Prince Reuss Younger Line
10. Duke Eugen of Württemberg
5. Duchess Agnes of Württemberg
11. Princess Helene of Hohenlohe-Langenburg
1. Princess Viktoria Feodora Reuss
12. Ernst I, Prince of Hohenlohe-Langenburg
6. Hermann, Prince of Hohenlohe-Langenburg
13. Princess Feodora of Leiningen
3. Princess Elise of Hohenlohe-Langenburg
14. Prince William of Baden
7. Princess Leopoldine of Baden
15. Duchess Elisabeth Alexandrine of Württemberg
