= Duchess Woizlawa Feodora of Mecklenburg =

German royal

Woizlawa Feodora Prinzessin Reuss
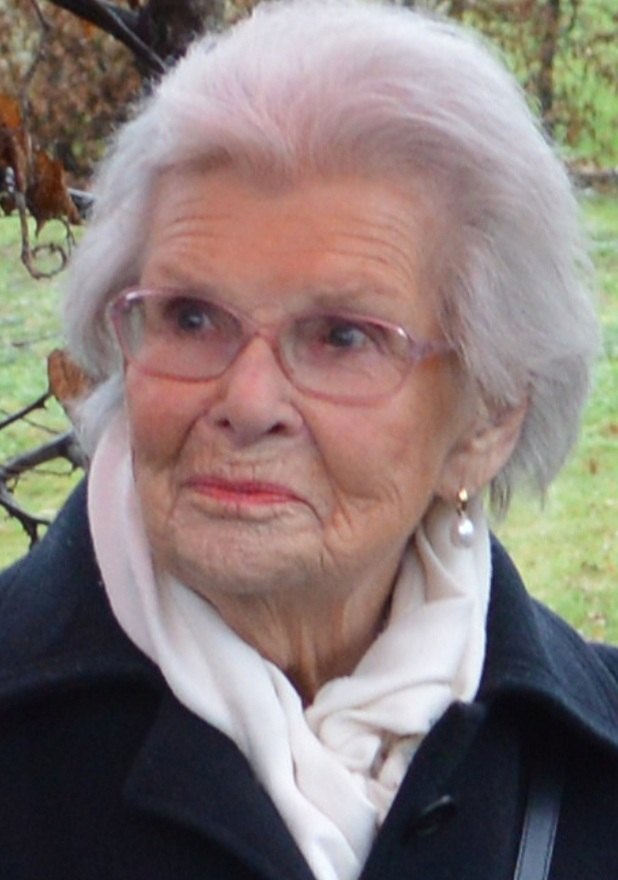
- Woizlawa Feodora Reuss, 2018
- Born: 17 December 1918; Rostock, Free State of Mecklenburg-Schwerin
- Died: 3 June 2019 (aged 100); Strittmatt (Görwihl), Baden-Württemberg, Germany
- Spouse: Heinrich I Prinz Reuss (m. 1939; died 1982)
- Issue: Feodora; Heinrich VIII; Heinrich IX; Heinrich X Heinrich XIII; Heinrich XV
- House: House of Mecklenburg-Schwerin (by birth); House of Reuss (by marriage)
- Father: Duke Adolf Friedrich of Mecklenburg-Schwerin
- Mother: Princess Viktoria Feodora Reuss of Schleiz
- Religion: Lutheranism

Woizlawa Feodora Princess Reuss (née Duchess of Mecklenburg-Schwerin, 17 December 1918 – 3 June 2019) was a member of the German nobility, by birth of the House of Mecklenburg-Schwerin. At the time of her death at the age of 100, she was the oldest living member of a ruling family and the oldest living resident of Görwihl.

== Early life and ancestry ==
Duchess Woizlawa Feodore Elise Marie Elisabeth of Mecklenburg-Schwerin was born at Rostock, Free State of Mecklenburg-Schwerin on 17 December 1918, just after the abdication of her first cousin Frederick Francis IV of the Grand Duchy of Mecklenburg-Schwerin, after the November Revolution, the expulsion of Kaiser Wilhelm II, and the proclamation of the Republic on 9 November 1918.

Her father was Duke Adolf Friedrich of Mecklenburg Governor of Togoland (in German West Africa) from 1912 until 1914. Her father was the seventh son of Frederick Francis II, Grand Duke of Mecklenburg-Schwerin (1823–1883) by his third wife Princess Marie of Schwarzburg-Rudolstadt (1850–1922). Her mother was Viktoria Feodora Reuss zu Schleiz (1889–1918), the eldest child of Heinrich XXVII, Prince of Reuss zu Schleiz, regent of Principality of Reuss-Greiz and Princess Elise of Hohenlohe-Langenburg, granddaughter of Princess Feodora of Leiningen, half-sister of Queen Victoria. Her mother died a day after giving birth to Woizlawa.

She was named for Woizlawa, the daughter of Wartislaw I (d. 1135), Duke of Pomerania, and the wife of Pribislav (d. 1178), an Oborite prince and the first Duke of Mecklenburg. Her name was an acknowledgement that the House of Mecklenburg, although Germanized over the centuries, was originally of Slavic origins.

She was a first cousin of:

- Cyril Vladimirovich, Grand Duke of Russia (1876–1938) pretender to the Russian throne after the assassination of his cousin Nicholas II of Russia.
- Queen Alexandrine of Denmark (1879–1952), consort of Christian X of Denmark.
- Cecilie, German Crown Princess (1886–1954), wife of William, German Crown Prince.
- Queen Juliana of the Netherlands (1909–2004), queen regnant of the Netherlands.

== Juliana's wedding ==
Preparations for the wedding of Queen Wilhelmina of the Netherlands' only child Crown Princess Juliana to the German Prince Bernhard of Lippe-Biesterfeld were underway in 1937 when a diplomatic scandal occurred. Various members of his family and friends were aligned with the Nazis, and a number of them would attend the royal wedding. Protocol demanded that the prospective Prince-Consort be invited to an audience with his head of state, who at the time was Adolf Hitler. The affair resulted in Wilhelmina's opinion that the wedding be a family affair; consequently, she did not invite foreign royalty unless she was personally familiar with them. As a result, Juliana's chosen bridesmaids were either her relatives or relatives of her groom. These included Woizlawa herself (being first cousins), Duchess Thyra of Mecklenburg-Schwerin (her second cousin), Grand Duchess Kira Kirillovna of Russia (her first cousin once removed), Princess Sophie of Saxe-Weimar-Eisenach (her second cousin), and two of Bernhard's first cousins, Princess Sieglinde and Princess Elisabeth of Lippe.

== Marriage and family ==
On 15 September 1939, she married in Bad Doberan to her distant relative Heinrich I Prinz Reuss (1910−1982), the eldest son of Prince Heinrich XXXIV Reuss of Schleiz (1887-1956) and his wife and cousin, Princess Sophie Renata Reuss of Köstritz (1884-1968). Heinrich I had been adopted in 1935 by her childless and unmarried uncle Heinrich XLV. Heinrich XLV had become an enthusiastic Nazi sympathizer and member of the Nazi Party in the early 1930s. In World War II, he was a Wehrmacht officer and in August 1945, he was arrested by the Red Army and presumed missing.

They had six children:

- Feodora Elisabeth Sophie Prinzessin Reuss (born 5 February 1942), married Gisbert Graf zu Stolberg-Wernigerode (born 1942); has issue.
- Heinrich VIII Prinz Reuss (born 30 August 1944), married Dorit Freiin von Ruffin (born 1948); has issue.
- Heinrich IX Prinz Reuss (born 30 June 1947), married Amelie Freiin Besserer von Thalfingen (born 1959); has issue.
- Heinrich X Prinz Reuss (born 28 July 1948), married Baroness Elisabeth Akerhielm af Margarethelund (born 1946; divorced); has issue. He later married Antonia Gräfin von Arnim (born 1949); no issue.
- Heinrich XIII Prinz Reuss (born 4 December 1951), married Susan Doukht Jaladi (born 1956); has issue.
- Heinrich XV Prinz Reuss (born 9 October 1956), married Anja Charlotte Noothcooper (born 1975); has issue.

== Restitution claim ==
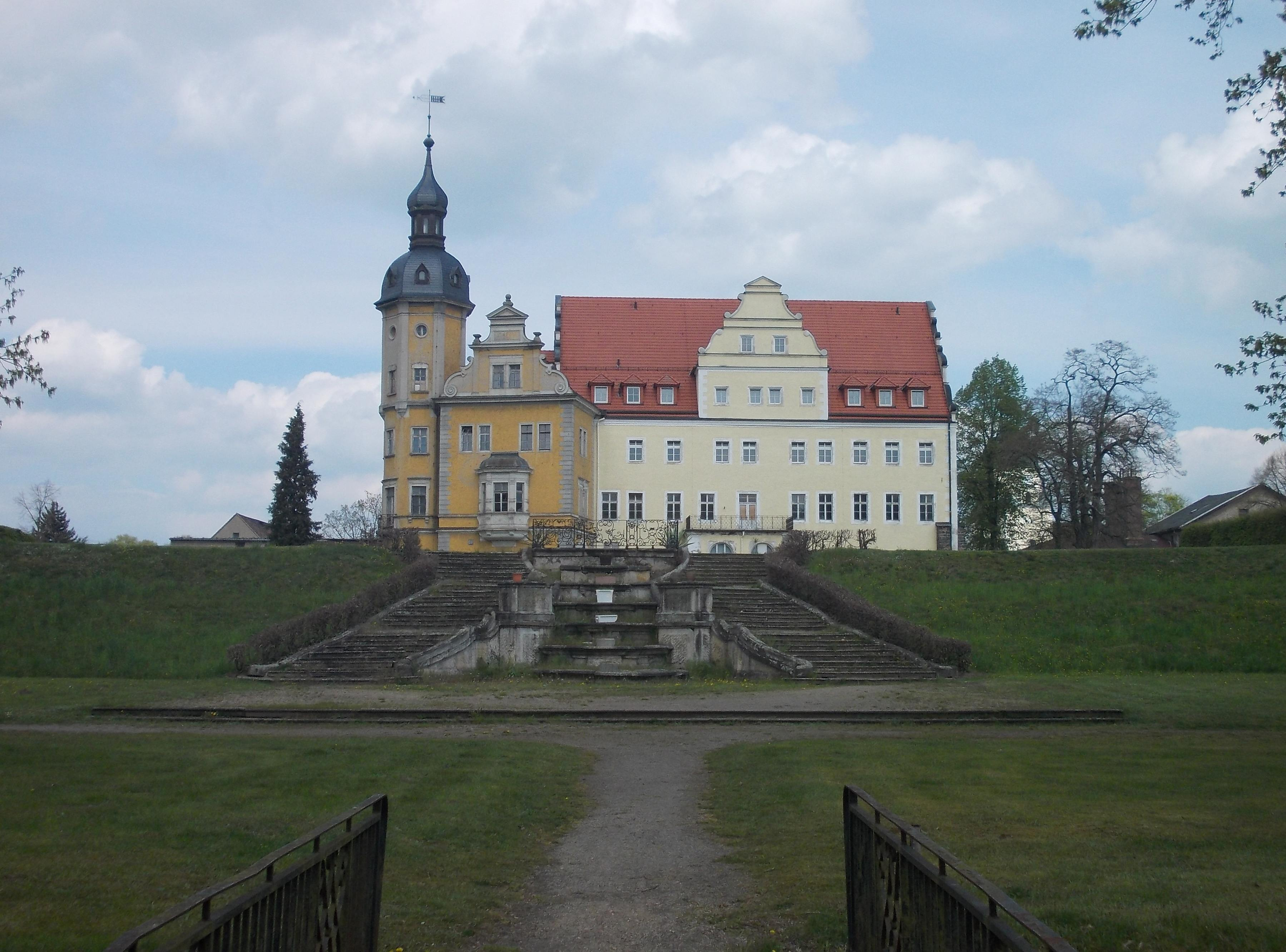
Thallwitz castle, now abandoned and in a neglected condition

In 1935 Woizlawa Feodora's husband was adopted by one of his relatives, Heinrich XLV, Hereditary Prince Reuss Younger Line, head and last male member of the House of Reuss Younger Line, for inheritance reasons, and after the latter's death in 1945 had become the sole heir of the private assets that had remained in the ownership of the House of Reuss Younger Line after its dethronement in the German Revolution of 1918. In 1945, the communist land reform in the Soviet occupation zone (East Germany) expropriated all movable and immovable assets of the House of Reuss. After the German reunification of 1990, she, as her husband's heir, claimed restitution based on the fact that her late husband was of British nationality, as well as German, and should thus legally not have been expropriated under occupation law. Furthermore, a legal restitution claim for movable assets was passed by the Bundestag, leading to vast returns of museum items. In a settlement, she also received Thallwitz castle and some forest property.

== Ancestry ==
Ancestors of Duchess Woizlawa Feodora of Mecklenburg

8. Paul Frederick, Grand Duke of Mecklenburg-Schwerin
4. Frederick Francis II, Grand Duke of Mecklenburg-Schwerin
9. Princess Alexandrine of Prussia
2. Duke Adolf Friedrich of Mecklenburg-Schwerin
10. Prince Adolph of Schwarzburg-Rudolstadt
5. Princess Marie of Schwarzburg-Rudolstadt
11. Princess Mathilde of Schönburg-Waldenburg
1. Duchess Woizlawa Feodora of Mecklenburg
12. Heinrich XIV, Prince Reuss Younger Line
6. Heinrich XXVII, Prince Reuss Younger Line
13. Duchess Agnes of Württemberg
3. Princess Victoria Feodora Reuss of Schleiz
14. Hermann, Prince of Hohenlohe-Langenburg
7. Princess Elise of Hohenlohe-Langenburg
15. Princess Leopoldine of Baden
