= Heinrich XLV, Hereditary Prince Reuss Younger Line =

Head of the House of Reuss from 1928 to 1945

Heinrich XLV
- Hereditary Prince Reuss Younger Line
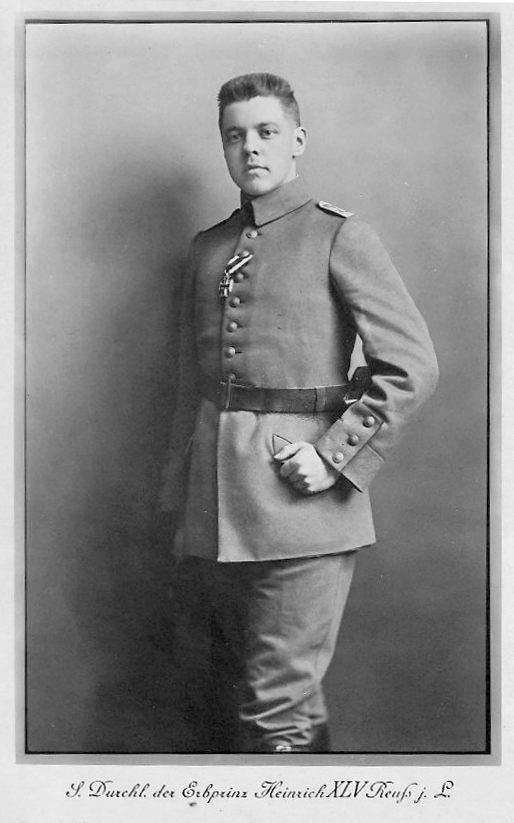
- Prince Heinrich XLV c. 1914–1918
- Born: 13 May 1895; Ebersdorf, Principality of Reuss-Gera
- Disappeared: 1945 (aged 49–50); NKVD special camp Nr. 2, Weimar, Allied-occupied Germany
- Status: Declared dead 5 January 1962 (aged 66)
Names
- German: Heinrich
- House: Reuss Younger Line; Reuss
- Father: Heinrich XXVII, Prince Reuss Younger Line
- Mother: Princess Elise of Hohenlohe-Langenburg

Heinrich XLV, Hereditary Prince Reuss Younger Line (German: Heinrich XLV Prinz Reuß jüngere Linie; 13 May 1895 – disappeared 1945; declared dead 5 January 1962) was the head of the House of Reuss from 1928 to 1945, as well the last male member of the Reuss-Schleiz branch of the Younger Line.

== Early life ==
Heinrich XLV was born at Ebersdorf, in the Principality of Reuss-Gera (present-day Thuringia), only surviving son of Heinrich XXVII, Prince Reuss Younger Line (1858–1928), (son of Heinrich XIV, Prince Reuss Younger Line, and Duchess Agnes of Württemberg) and his wife, Princess Elise of Hohenlohe-Langenburg (1864–1929), (daughter of Hermann, Prince of Hohenlohe-Langenburg and Princess Leopoldine of Baden).

He attended high school in Dresden and served as a lieutenant in the First World War. After the war he studied in Leipzig, Marburg, Munich and Kiel, literature, music and philosophy.

He was a great theatre lover and supporter and was a director, writer and consultant. In 1923, Heinrich XLV became head of the dramaturgy department at Reussian Theatre in Gera.

== Head of the House of Reuss ==
At the death of his father on 21 November 1928 he became head of the House of Reuss after the Younger and Elder Lines merged, when the Elder Line became extinct in the male line in 1927.

In 1935 he adopted one of his relatives, Prince Heinrich I (1910–1982) a member of the Köstritz branch of the Princely family of Reuss. The adoption took place for inheritance reasons, not for succession rights for the headship of the House of Reuss. In 1939 Heinrich I married Duchess Woizlawa Feodora of Mecklenburg, the niece of Heinrich XLV.

During the 1930s Heinrich XLV became an enthusiastic Nazi sympathizer and member of the Nazi Party. In August 1945, he was arrested in Ebersdorf by the Soviet military, and is presumed missing. Although he was most likely interned and killed in NKVD special camp Nr. 2 in Buchenwald, his name is not in any of the special camps' lists of the dead. It was only on 5 January 1962 that he was declared dead by a court in Büdingen. His entire fortune was seized and confiscated in 1948 by the Soviet Military Administration, including Ebersdorf Castle, Thallwitz Castle, and Osterstein Castle in Gera.

Heinrich XLV remained unmarried and childless and the succession of the House of Reuss passed to Prince Heinrich IV of the Reuss of Köstritz branch.

== Ancestry ==
Ancestors of Heinrich XLV, Hereditary Prince Reuss Younger Line

8. Heinrich LXVII, Prince Reuss Younger Line
4. Heinrich XIV, Prince Reuss Younger Line
9. Princess Adelheid Reuss of Ebersdorf
2. Heinrich XXVII, Prince Reuss Younger Line
10. Duke Eugen of Württemberg
5. Duchess Agnes of Württemberg
11. Princess Helene of Hohenlohe-Langenburg
1. Heinrich XLV, Prince Reuss Younger Line
12. Ernst I, Prince of Hohenlohe-Langenburg
6. Hermann, Prince of Hohenlohe-Langenburg
13. Princess Feodora of Leiningen
3. Princess Elise of Hohenlohe-Langenburg
14. Prince William of Baden
7. Princess Leopoldine of Baden
15. Duchess Elisabeth Alexandrine of Württemberg

== Notes and sources ==
- The Royal House of Stuart, London, 1969, 1971, 1976, Addington, A. C., Reference: II 224

Heinrich XLV, Hereditary Prince Reuss Younger Line House of Reuss Younger Line Cadet branch of the House of Reuss Born: 13 May 1895 Died: 1945
Titles in pretence
Preceded by Heinrich XXVII	— TITULAR — Prince Reuss; 1928 – 1945, officially 1962; Reason for succession failure: Principality abolished in 1918	Succeeded by Heinrich IV Reuss of Köstritz
