= Heinrich IV, Prince Reuss of Köstritz =

Heinrich IV
- Prince Reuss
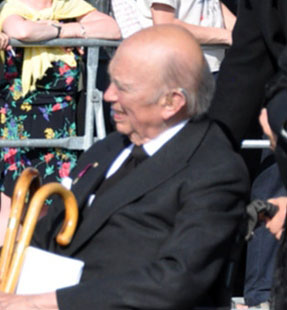
- Prince Heinrich IV in 2011 at the funeral of Crown Prince Otto von Habsburg

Head of House of Reuss
- Period: 1945/1962 – 2012
- Predecessor: Prince (Fürst) Heinrich XLV
- Successor: Heinrich XIV (in pretense)
- Born: 26 October 1919; Ernstbrunn, Austria
- Died: 20 June 2012 (aged 92); Ernstbrunn, Austria
- Burial: Ernstbrunn, Austria
- Spouse: Princess Marie Luise of Salm-Horstmar (m. 1954; died 2012)
- Father: Heinrich XXXIX, Prince Reuss of Köstritz
- Mother: Countess Antonia of Castell-Castell

Heinrich IV, Prince Reuss (26 October 1919 – 20 June 2012) was the head of the German formerly princely House of Reuss.

== Early life ==
He was born on 26 October 1919 in Ernstbrunn, Austria, the son of Heinrich XXXIX, Prince Reuss of Köstritz and Countess Antonia of Castell-Castell.

His paternal grandparents were Heinrich XXIV, Prince Reuss of Köstritz and Princess Elisabeth Reuss of Köstritz. His maternal grandparents were Friedrich Karl, 1st Prince of Castell-Castell and Countess Gertrud zu Stolberg-Wernigerode.

== Career ==
Heinrich IV became head of the princely family after the previous Prince Heinrich XLV went missing in 1945 and was declared dead in 1962. He lived with his family at Castle Ernstbrunn in Lower Austria. His son, Heinrich, also bought a piece of expropriated property in Eastern Germany.

== Personal life ==
On 10 June 1954 the prince married Princess Marie Luise of Salm-Horstmar (1918–2015), daughter of Otto, 3rd Prince of Salm-Horstmar, and Countess Rosa of Solms-Baruth. Together, they had one son and three daughters. Heinrich IV died at Ernstbrunn on 20 June 2012. He was succeeded by his only son, Heinrich XIV.

Heinrich IV, Prince Reuss of Köstritz House of Reuss Born: 26 October 1919
Titles in pretence
Preceded by Heinrich XLV Reuss of Schleiz	— TITULAR — Prince Reuss after 1945, officially 1962 – 20 June 2012; Reason for succession failure: Monarchy abolished in 1918	Succeeded by Heinrich XIV, Prince Reuss of Köstritz
