= Heinrich XXIV =

Heinrich XXIV may refer to:

- Heinrich XXIV, Count Reuss of Ebersdorf (1724 — 1779)
- Heinrich XXIV, Prince Reuss of Köstritz (1855 — 1910)
- Heinrich XXIV, Prince Reuss of Greiz (1878 — 1927)
