= 1919 Reuss-Gera state election =

German state election

The 1919 Reuss-Gera state election was held on 2 February 1919 to elect the 21 members of the Landtag of Reuss-Gera.

== Results ==
| Party | Votes | % | Seats |
|---|---|---|---|
| Social Democratic Party of Germany and Independent Social Democratic Party of Germany | 44,282 | 62.16 | 13 |
| German National People's Party and German People's Party | 14,985 | 21.04 | 5 |
| German Democratic Party | 11,968 | 16.80 | 3 |
| Total | 71,235 | 100.00 | 21 |
| Registered voters/turnout | 86,991 | – | |
Source: Elections in the Weimar Republic,
