= Princess Elise of Hohenlohe-Langenburg =

Princess Elise
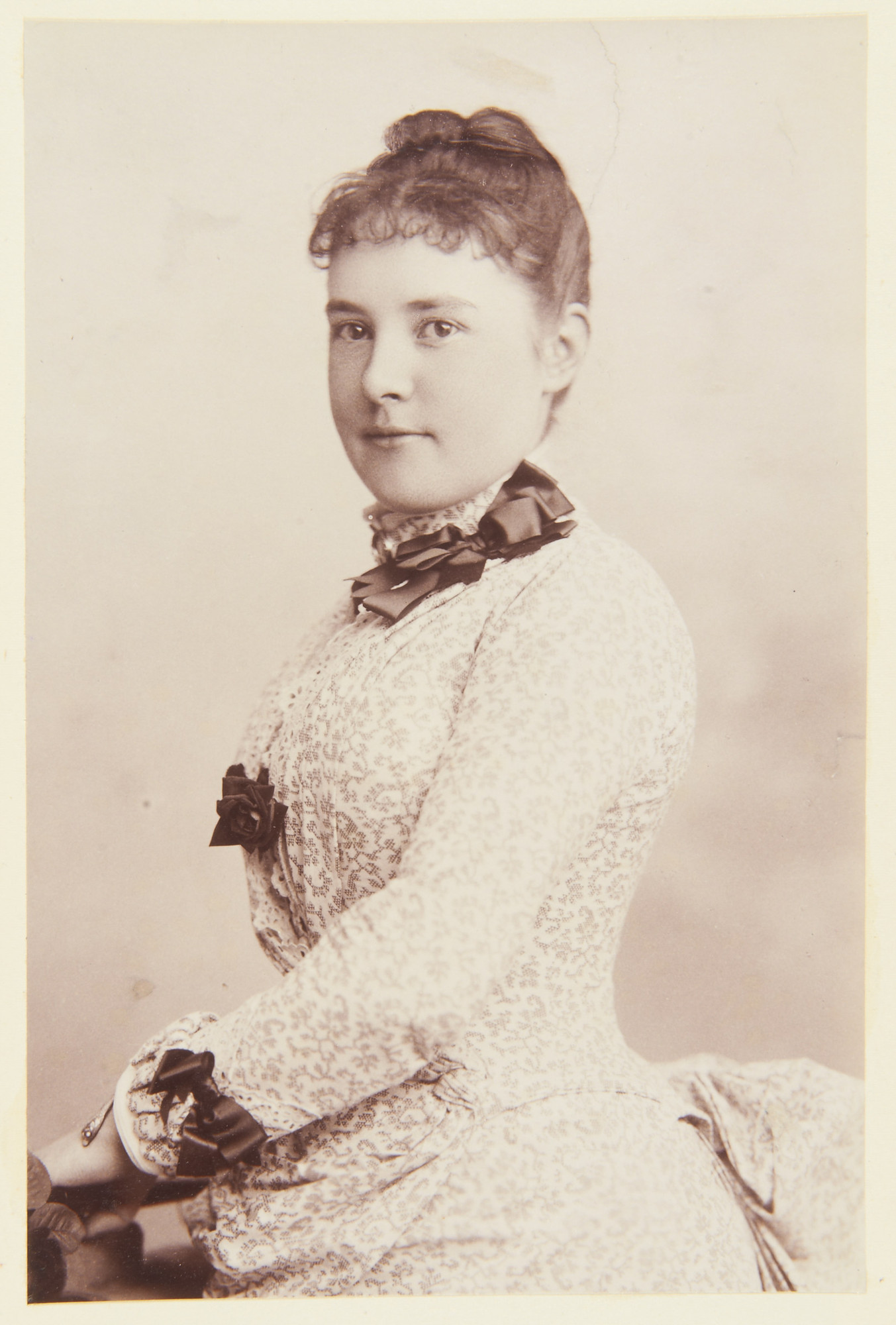
- Princess Elise in 1884

Princess Reuss of Gera
- Tenure: 29 March 1913 – 11 November 1918
- Born: 4 September 1864; Langenburg, Kingdom of Württemberg Germany
- Died: 18 March 1929 (aged 64); Gera, Germany
- Spouse: Heinrich XXVII, Prince Reuss Younger Line (m. 1884; died 1928)
- Issue Detail: Princess Viktoria; Princess Luise Adelheid; Heinrich XL; Heinrich XLIII; Heinrich XLV, Hereditary Prince Reuss Younger Line
Names
- German: Elise Victoria Feodora Sophie Adelheid
- House: Hohenlohe-Langenburg
- Father: Hermann, Prince of Hohenlohe-Langenburg
- Mother: Princess Leopoldine of Baden

Princess Elise of Hohenlohe-Langenburg (Elise Victoria Feodora Sophie Adelheid; 4 September 1864 – 18 March 1929) was Princess Reuss Younger Line as the wife of Heinrich XXVII. She was the eldest daughter of Hermann, Prince of Hohenlohe-Langenburg, and Princess Leopoldine of Baden.

== Biography ==
Elise was born in Langenburg as the second child and first daughter of Hermann, Prince of Hohenlohe-Langenburg and his wife Princess Leopoldine of Baden, daughter of Prince Wilhelm of Baden. She was a grand-niece of Queen Victoria, as Princess Victoria of Saxe-Coburg-Saalfeld, who was also the mother of Queen Victoria, had been previously married to Emich Carl, 2nd Prince of Leiningen with whom she had two children, one of whom was Elise's paternal grandmother. She was known as "Elli" to her relatives.

Elise had one elder brother Ernst who, at their father's death, succeeded to the title of 7th Prince of Hohenlohe-Langenburg (Fürst zu Hohenlohe-Langenburg), and one younger sister Princess Feodora (1866–1932), who in 1894, married Emich, 5th Prince of Leiningen.

== Marriage ==
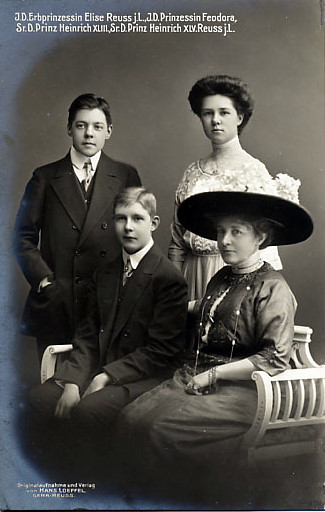
Princess Elise of Hohenlohe-Langenburg with her children.

On 11 November 1884, Elise married in Langenburg, Heinrich XXVII, Prince Reuss Younger Line, eldest child of Heinrich XIV, Prince Reuss Younger Line (1832–1913), and Duchess Agnes of Württemberg (1835–1886). They had five children:

- Princess Viktoria Feodora Reuss JL (21 April 1889 – 18 December 1918) she married Duke Adolf Friedrich of Mecklenburg-Schwerin on 24 April 1917. They had one daughter.
- Princess Luise Reuss JL (17 July 1890 – 12 August 1951)
- Prince Heinrich XL Reuss JL (17 September 1891 – 4 November 1891)
- Prince Heinrich XLIII Reuss JL (25 July 1893 – 13 May 1912)
- Heinrich XLV, Hereditary Prince Reuss Younger Line (13 May 1895 – 1945)

== Later life ==
In 1913, Henry became the reigning Prince Reuss Younger Line, Elise becoming Princess consort. Prince Heinrich XXVII abdicated in 1918 after the German Revolution of 1918–19, when all German monarchies were abolished.

After the death of Heinrich XXIV, Prince Reuss Elder Line in 1927, the titles passed to Heinrich XXVII and became Prince Reuss.

Elise died on March 18, 1929, surviving her spouse by six months.

== Ancestry ==
Ancestors of Princess Elise of Hohenlohe-Langenburg

8. Karl Ludwig, 3rd Prince of Hohenlohe-Langenburg
4. Ernst I, 4th Prince of Hohenlohe-Langenburg
9. Countess Amalie Henriette of Solms-Baruth
2. Hermann, 6th Prince of Hohenlohe-Langenburg
10. Emich Carl, 2nd Prince of Leiningen
5. Princess Feodora of Leiningen
11. Princess Victoria of Saxe-Coburg-Saalfeld
1. Princess Elise of Hohenlohe-Langenburg
12. Charles Frederick, Grand Duke of Baden
6. Prince William of Baden
13. Louise Caroline of Hochberg
3. Princess Leopoldine of Baden
14. Duke Louis of Württemberg
7. Duchess Elisabeth Alexandrine of Württemberg
15. Princess Henriette of Nassau-Weilburg
