= Heinrich XXIV, Prince Reuss of Köstritz =

German composer

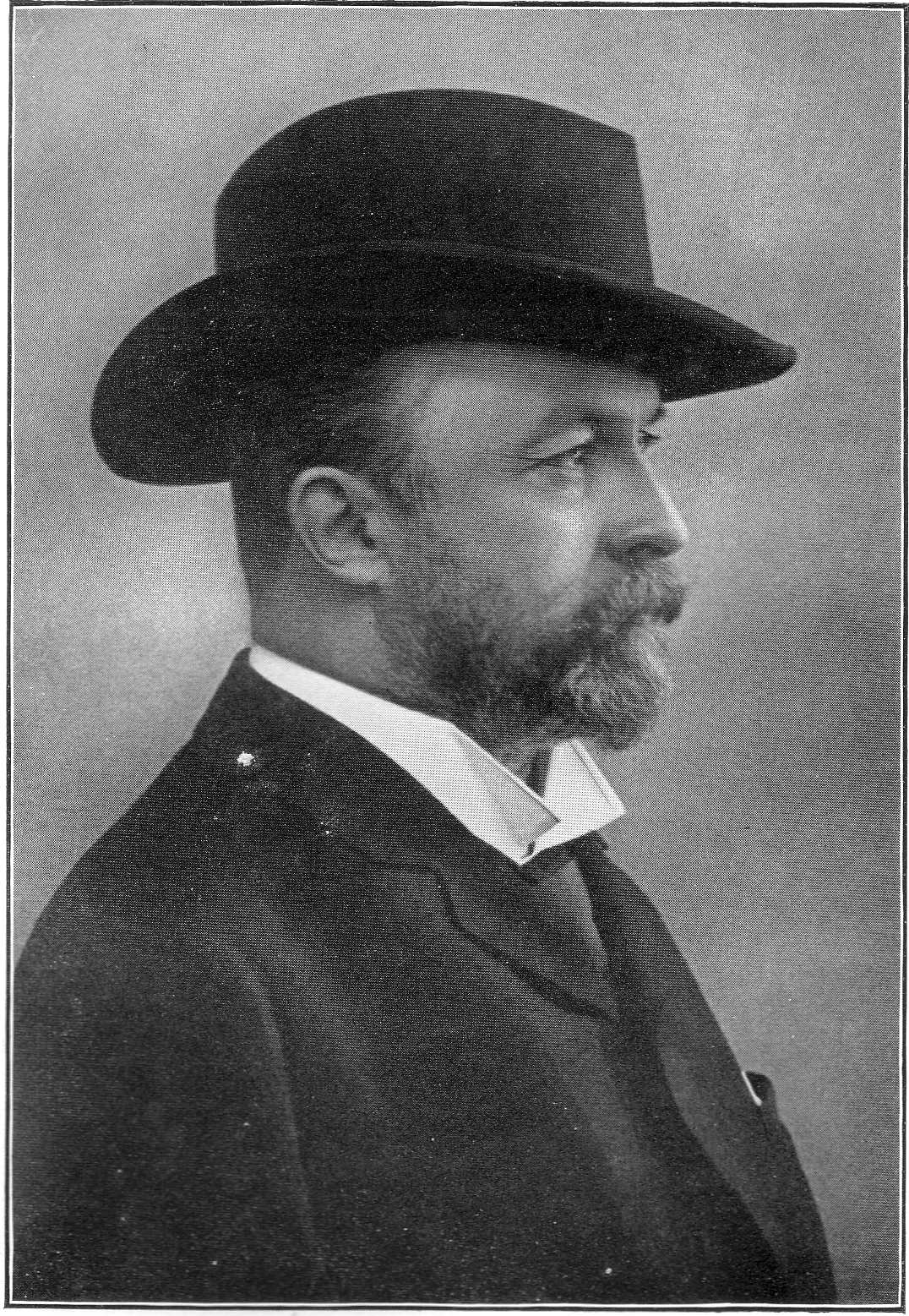
Photograph of the composer Prince Heinrich XXIV in 1907.

Prince Heinrich XXIV Reuss of Köstritz, also Prince Heinrich XXIV Reuss, Younger Line (German: Heinrich XXIV. Prinz Reuß zu Köstritz, also Heinrich XXIV. Prinz Reuß jüngere Linie, 8 December 1855 – 2 October 1910) was a German aristocrat and composer.

== Early life ==
Heinrich XXIV was born on 8 December 1855 in Trebschen in the Province of Brandenburg, Kingdom of Prussia. A descendant of the Reuss-Köstritz line, the Younger Line, of the extended German noble family of Reuss, he was the son of Prince (Fürst, monarch) Heinrich IV Reuss of Köstritz (1821–1894) and Princess Luise Caroline Reuss of Greiz (1822–1875). Among his siblings were Eleonore Reuss of Köstritz, Tsaritsa of Bulgaria.

Heinrich XXIV spent his youth in Vienna, where he was influenced greatly by the artistic atmosphere of his parents' home. He received his first music lessons in piano, organ and counterpoint from his father Heinrich IV, himself a dilettante and composition student of Carl Gottlieb Reissiger.

== Career ==
Heinrich XXIV received formal music instruction in Dresden, and continued his studies at the Universities, first in Bonn, then in Leipzig where he was a pupil of Wilhelm Rust. Despite his obvious musical talent, he decided to pursue a degree in law. After graduating in 1883, however, he devoted himself almost exclusively to his musical interests. Starting in 1881 he studied composition with Heinrich von Herzogenberg, to whom he developed a friendly attachment. Through Herzogenberg he came to know Johannes Brahms, whom he much admired. Although he never received formal instruction from Brahms, he did receive many helpful hints from Brahms, "teaching him more in ten minutes than Herzogenberg managed to do in months."

=== Musical style ===
The musical style of Heinrich XXIV was strongly influenced by Brahms, however, on the whole it differs from that being lighter in tone, and thus resembles more the style of his teacher, Heinrich von Herzogenberg. A stylistic proximity to the works of Antonín Dvořák is evident. Heinrich XXIV's compositions display a masterful command of musical form and technique, especially in contrapuntal voice leading. As with Brahms, Dvořák and Herzogenberg, chamber music was his main field of creativity; he contributed numerous works in various genres. Notable among his other creations are his six symphonies.

During his lifetime, the compositions of Heinrich XXIV enjoyed a good reputation even in academic circles. Max Reger was also one of his admirers. Even in the years after his death, his compositions were warmly recommended by various musical authorities, as expressed, for example, by the musicologist Wilhelm Altmann in the third volume of his Handbook for String Quartet Players published in 1929. He wrote concerning the String Sextet No. 2 in B minor: "[It] is a work with artistic value close to that of the two Brahms Sextets. Every friend of chamber music should know it." Since 1930, word of the composer and his works has become increasingly silent.

== Personal life ==
On 27 May 1884, Heinrich XXIV was married to his cousin Princess Elisabeth Reuss of Köstritz (1860–1931), a daughter of Prince Heinrich LXXIV Reuss of Köstritz, and Countess Eleonore zu Stolberg-Wernigerode. Together, they were the parents of five children:

- Princess Regina Felizitas Helene Luise Amadea Reuss zu Köstritz (1886–1980), who married Count Georg Ernst Maria Karl Joseph Anton zu Stolberg-Stolberg.
- Princess Sibylle Gabriele Reuss zu Köstritz (1888–1977), who married Count Wolfgang Friedrich Julius Magnus zu Castell-Castell.
- Prince Heinrich XXXIX Reuss zu Köstritz (1891–1946), who married Countess Antonia zu Castell-Castell.
- Prince Heinrich XLI Reuss zu Köstritz (1892–1916), who died unmarried.
- Princess Viola Gasparine Eleonore Reuss zu Köstritz (1898–1978), who died unmarried.

Heinrich XXIV Reuss of Köstritz died at age 54 in Ernstbrunn in Lower Austria, the ancestral seat from 1828.

=== Descendants ===
Through his eldest son Henrich XXXIX, he was a grandfather of Heinrich IV, Prince Reuss of Köstritz (1919–2012), who became the Head of House of Reuss after the previous Prince Heinrich XLV went missing in 1945 and was declared dead in 1962.

== Selected works ==
Orchestra

- Symphony No. 1 in C minor, Op. 10 (1892)
- Symphony No. 2 in D major - LOST (Stolle biography, p. 103)
- Symphony No. 3 in E minor, Op. 28 (1907)
- Symphony No. 4 in A major, Op. 30
- Symphony No. 5 in F minor, Op. 34 (published 1907)
- Symphony No. 6 in E♭ major, Op. 36 (published 1909)

Chamber music

- String Quartet No. 1 in D minor, Op. 1 (1881?)
- String Quintet in F major for 2 violins, 2 violas and cello, Op. 4 (1887)
- Sonata No. 1 in G minor for violin and piano, Op. 5 (published by Peters, 1888)
- Piano Quartet in F minor, Op. 6 (1895)
- Sonata in C major for cello and piano, Op. 7 (1895)
- String Quartet No. 2 in F major, Op. 11
- String Sextet No. 1 in D minor, Op. 12 (1899)
- Piano Trio in C♯ minor, Op. 14 (1903)
- Piano Quintet in C major, Op. 15 (1902)
- String Quartet No. 3 in A♭ major, Op. 16 (1903)
- String Sextet No. 2 in B minor, Op. 17 (1902)
- Sonata No. 2 for violin and piano, Op. 21 (published c.1880?)
- Sonata in G major for viola and piano, Op. 22 (by 1904)
- String Quartet No. 4 in G minor, Op. 23, No. 1 (published 1904)
- String Quartet No. 5 in E♭ major, Op. 23, No. 2 (pub. 1904)
- Piano Trio in A major for violin, viola and piano, Op. 25

Piano

- Drei Präludien (3 Preludes), Op. 2
- Suite, Op. 8 (1895)

1. Praeludium
2. Allemande
3. Gavotte
4. Siciliano
5. Bourrée
6. Sarabande
7. Gigue

- Variationen und Fuge über ein eigenes Thema (Variations and Fugue on an Original Theme), Op. 19 (published c. 1904)

Vocal

- Fünf Lieder (5 Songs) for voice and piano, Op. 3 (1883); texts by Ludwig Uhland and Nikolaus Lenau
- Tu nos fecisti ad te, Motet for mixed chorus a capella, Op. 24 (published c. 1890); text by Aurelius Augustinus
- 3 Geistliche Lieder (3 Sacred Songs) for 3-part women's chorus and organ or piano, Op. 27 (published 1907)
