= Duke Adolf Friedrich of Mecklenburg =

German explorer and politician

Duke Adolf Friedrich
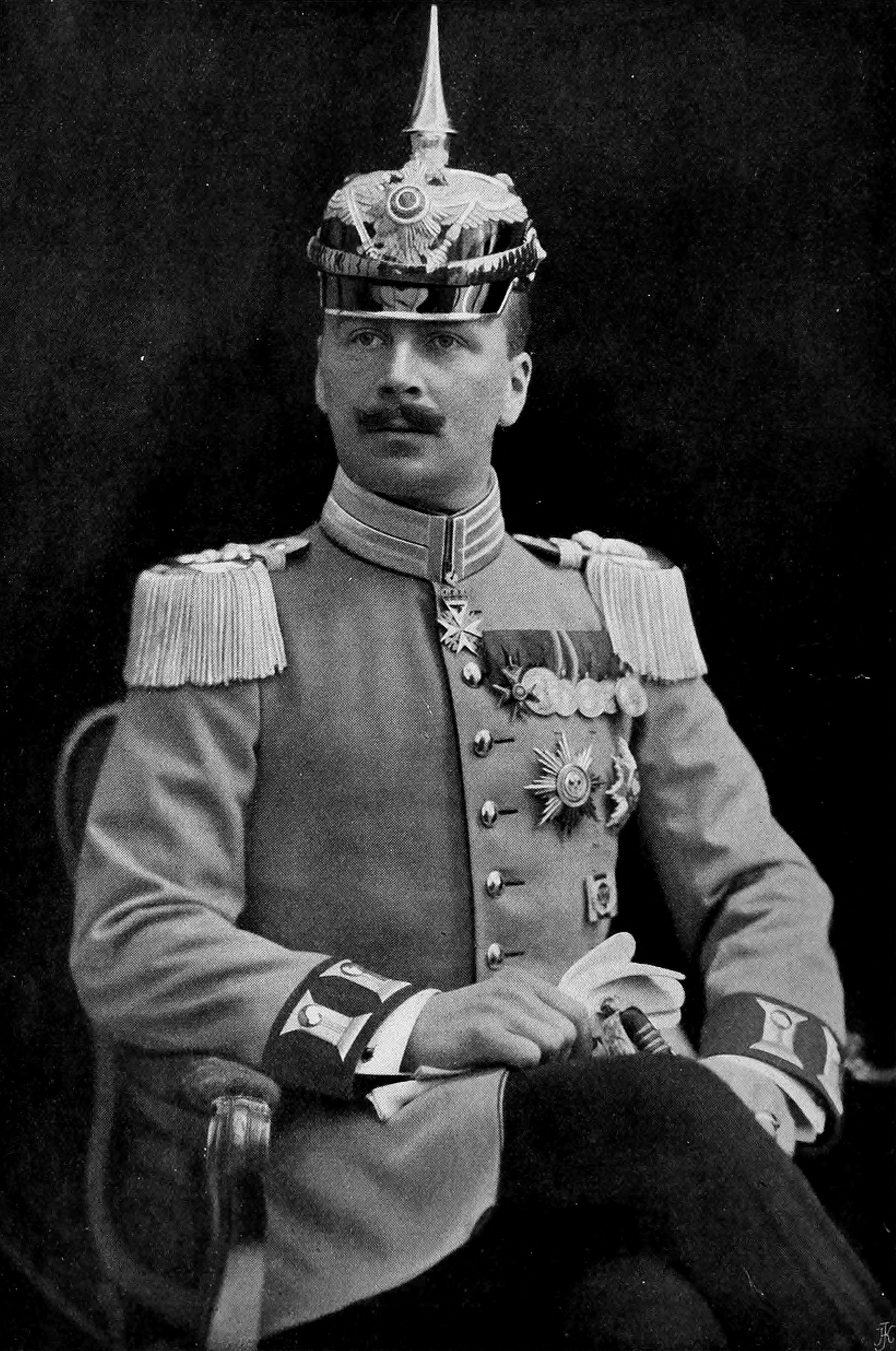
- Duke Adolf Friedrich in 1910

5th Governor of Togoland
- In office 19 June 1912 – 31 August 1914
- Monarch: Wilhelm II
- Chancellor: Theobald von Bethmann Hollweg
- Preceded by: Edmund Brückner
- Succeeded by: Hans Georg von Doering (acting)

Duke-Elect of the United Baltic Duchy
- Reign: 5 November 1918 – 11 November 1918 (never reigned)
- Predecessor: Nicholas II (as Tsar of Russia)
- Successor: Konstantin Päts (as Prime Minister of Estonia)
- Regent: Adolf Pilar von Pilchau
- Born: 10 October 1873; Schwerin, Mecklenburg-Schwerin, German Empire
- Died: 5 August 1969 (aged 95); Eutin, West Germany
- Spouse: Princess Viktoria Feodora Reuss of Schleiz (m. 1917; died 1918) Princess Elisabeth of Stolberg-Rossla (m. 1924)
- Issue: Woizlawa Feodora, Princess Heinrich I Reuss of Köstritz
Names
- Adolf Friedrich Albrecht Heinrich
- House: Mecklenburg-Schwerin
- Father: Frederick Francis II, Grand Duke of Mecklenburg-Schwerin
- Mother: Princess Marie of Schwarzburg-Rudolstadt

Duke Adolf Friedrich Albrecht Heinrich of Mecklenburg-Schwerin (German: Adolf Friedrich Albrecht Heinrich, Herzog zu Mecklenburg-Schwerin; 10 October 1873 – 5 August 1969), was a German explorer in Africa, a colonial politician, and the first president of the National Olympic Committee of West Germany (1949–1951).

== Biography ==
Born in Schwerin, Adolf Friedrich was the third child of Frederick Francis II, Grand Duke of Mecklenburg-Schwerin (1823–1883), and his third wife Princess Marie of Schwarzburg-Rudolstadt. His younger brother was Prince Hendrik of the Netherlands, prince consort to the Dutch Queen Wilhelmina.

=== Explorer of Africa ===
From 1907 to 1908, Adolf Friedrich led a scientific research expedition in the region of the Central African Graben and traversed Africa from east to west. In 1908, he was awarded the Eduard Vogel Medal of the Association of Geography of Leipzig. The insects from his expeditions and residence in Togo are in the Museum für Naturkunde in Berlin and in the Senckenberg Museum.

From 1910 to 1911, he led an expedition to Lake Chad and the northern rivers of the Congo to the Nile in current Sudan. Adolf Friedrich and his companions explored the then little-known primeval forest region of the Congo tributaries and the basin of Lake Chad. Individual groups extended their explorations to the Bahr el Ghazal near the upper Nile, while others travelled to south Cameroon and the islands of the Gulf of Guinea. Vom Kongo zum Niger und Nil ("From the Congo to the Niger and the Nile"), a two-volume work based on the 1910–1911 expeditions, has an excellent reputation today for its detail and images.

From 1912 to 1914, Adolf Friedrich was the last governor of Togoland in German West Africa; he was invited for the official celebration of the independence of Togo in 1960. After World War I, he served as the vice-president of the privately chartered German Colonial Society for Southwest Africa; his brother Johann Albrecht was president from 1895 to 1920.

=== Duke candidate for the planned United Baltic Duchy ===
At the end of the First World War, in the autumn of 1918, the Duke was offered the throne of the United Baltic Duchy, a short-lived client-state proclaimed on Baltic territories under German occupation.

By the Russo-German Treaty of Berlin (27 August 1918), Soviet Russia had formally relinquished all sovereignty over Baltic provinces of Estonia and Livonia, and on 22 September (1918), Germany formally recognized independence of those lands, that were effectively still under German military occupation.

By the autumn of 1918, the Duke was approached by Heinrich von Stryk, a representative of the Baltic German nobility, but final steps towards implementation of their plans were undertaken on 5 November, when representatives of Baltic Germans and some pro-German oriented leaders among Estonian and Latvian politicians from Courland, Livonia and Estonia met in Riga and proclaimed the creation of the United Baltic Duchy. Since the Duke was in Germany, the temporary regency council (Regentschaftsrat) was established in Riga, headed by baron Adolf Pilar von Pilchau, and consisting of three Baltic Germans, three Estonians and three Latvians. The newly proclaimed state was to be a union of seven cantons: Courland, Riga, Latgale, South Livonia (Südlivland, modern Vidzeme), North Livonia (Nordlivland, modern south Estonia), the Islands (Ösel, modern Saaremaa), and Estonia (Estland, modern north Estonia). Since Germany lost the War by 11 November, the Duke never assumed the Baltic throne. The newly created states of Estonia and Latvia emerged in the region, and the Baltic regency council functioned until 28 November 1918, when it was dissolved.

=== Member of the International Olympic Committee ===
Adolf Friedrich then served as a member of the International Olympic Committee from 1926 to 1956 and as the first president of the National Olympic Committee of Germany from 1949 to 1951.

=== Personal life ===
Adolf Friedrich was married twice. In Gera on 24 April 1917, he married Princess Viktoria Feodora of Reuss-Schleiz (1889-1918), daughter of Heinrich XXVII, Prince Reuss Younger Line and Princess Elise of Hohenlohe-Langenburg. She died a day after giving birth to their only daughter, Duchess Woizlawa Feodora, on 18 December 1918. He later married the widow of his half-brother Duke John Albert, Princess Elisabeth of Stolberg-Rossla, on 15 October 1924; they were among the guests at the 1937 wedding of Juliana of the Netherlands and Prince Bernhard of Lippe-Biesterfeld.

Princess Elisabeth survived her husband by only a few weeks after his death in Eutin in 1969.

== Legacy ==
Adolf Friedrich is commemorated in the scientific names of a genus of lizards, Adolfus, and of a species of chameleon, Kinyongia adolfifriderici, as well as in the cichlid Haplochromis adolphifrederici, and in the large tree species Aningeria adolfi-friederici.

== Works ==
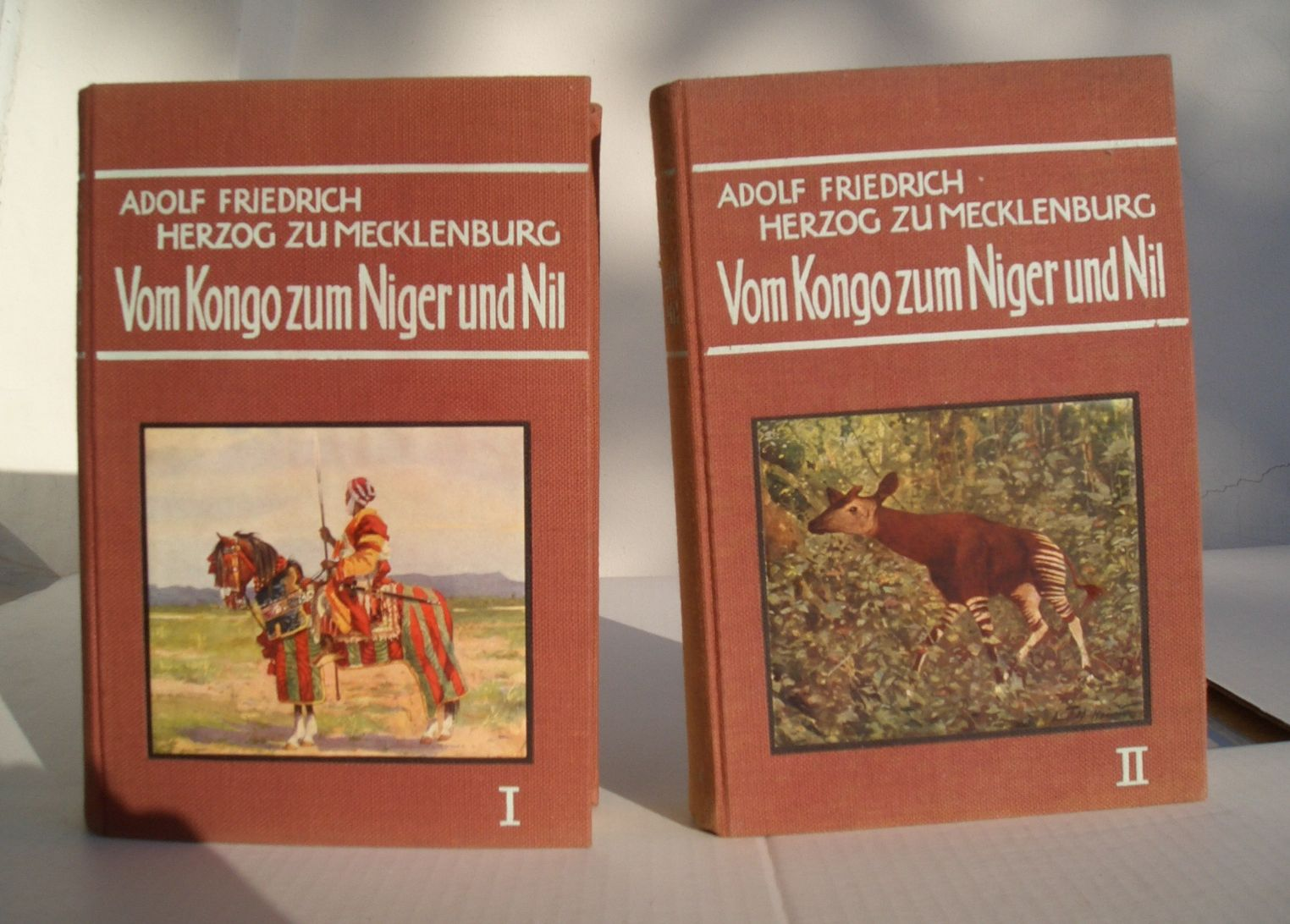
Vom Kongo zum Niger und Nil, 1912, First edition

- Ins innerste Afrika. Leipzig, 1909. Translated into English as In the Heart of Africa. London: Cassell, 1910. vol. 1, vol. 2, vol. 3.
- Vom Kongo zum Niger und Nil. Leipzig: F.A. Brockhaus, 1912. Translated into English as: From the Congo to the Niger and the Nile: An Account of the German Central African Expedition of 1910-1911. London: Duckworth, 1913. vol. 2.
- Wissenschaftliche Ergebnisse der Deutschen Zentral-Afrika-Expedition unter Führung Adolf Friedrichs, Herzog zu Mecklenburg. Leipzig, 1922. vol. 2, vol. 4, vol. 5, vol. 7.

== See also ==
- History of Togo
- German South-West Africa
- United Baltic Duchy
- International Olympic Committee

== Sources ==
- Michaelis, Herbert (1959). Ursachen und Folgen: Vom deutschen Zusammenbruch 1918 und 1945 bis zur staatlichen Neuordnung Deutschlands in der Gegenwart. Vol. 2. Berlin: Dokumenten-Verlag.
- Rauch, Georg (1974). The Baltic States: The Years of Independence: Estonia, Latvia, Lithuania, 1917-1940. London: Hurst.
- Sukiennicki, Wiktor (1984). East Central Europe During World War I: From Foreign Domination to National Independence. Boulder: East European Monographs.

Duke Adolf Friedrich of Mecklenburg House of Mecklenburg-Schwerin Born: 10 October 1873 Died: 5 August 1969
New title	Duke of the United Baltic Duchy; 22 September 1918 – 28 November 1918	Monarchy abolished
Titles in pretence
New title	— TITULAR — Duke of the United Baltic Duchy; 28 November 1918 – 5 August 1969; Reason for succession failure: Monarchy abolished	Extinct
