= Princess Elisabeth of Stolberg-Rossla =

Princess Elisabeth zu Stolberg-Rossla
- Duchess Elisabeth of Mecklenburg-Schwerin
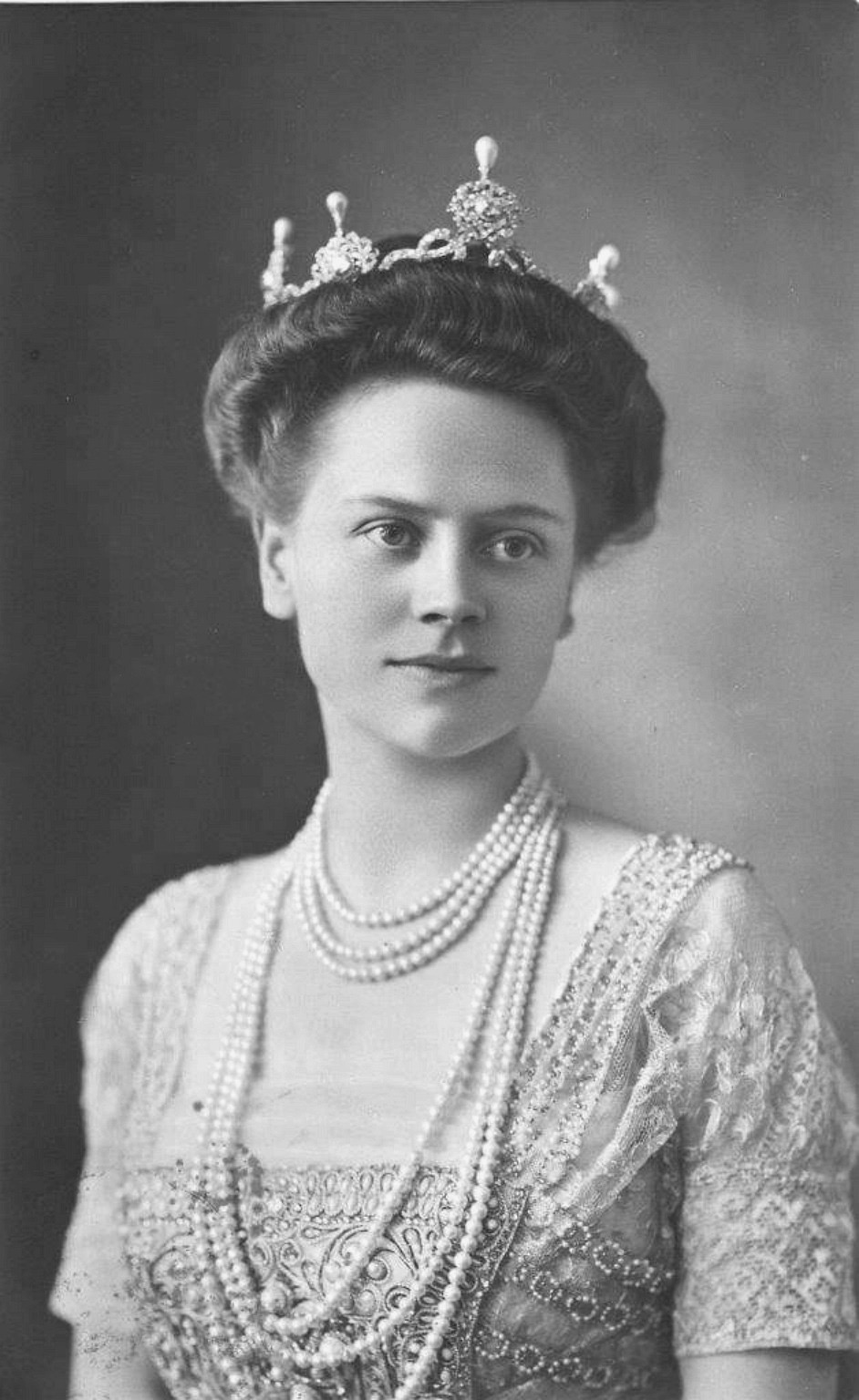
- Born: 23 July 1885; Roßla, Germany
- Died: 16 October 1969 (aged 84); Eutin, Schleswig-Holstein, Germany
- Spouse: Duke John Albert of Mecklenburg-Schwerin (m. 1909; died 1920) Duke Adolf Friedrich of Mecklenburg-Schwerin (m. 1924; died 1969)
- House: Stolberg-Rossla (by birth); Mecklenburg-Schwerin (by marriage)
- Father: Prince Botho of Stolberg-Rossla
- Mother: Princess Hedwig of Ysenburg und Büdingen

Princess Elisabeth of Stolberg-Rossla (German: Elisabeth zu Stolberg-Roßla; 23 July 1885, Roßla—16 October 1969, Eutin, Schleswig-Holstein) was the second wife of Duke Johann Albrecht of Mecklenburg, Regent of the Duchy of Brunswick.

== Early life and ancestry ==
Born into an ancient House of Stolberg, she was second daughter of Prince Botho of Stolberg-Rossla (1850-1893), son of Count Karl of Stolberg-Rossla (1822-1870) and his wife, Countess Bertha of Solms-Rödelheim and Assenheim (1824-1898). Her mother was Princess Hedwig of Ysenburg and Büdingen (1863-1925), eldest daughter of Bruno, 3rd Prince of Ysenburg and Büdingen and Princess Mathilde of Solms-Hohensolms-Lich (1842-1867).

== First marriage ==
She was married to Duke Johann Albrecht of Mecklenburg-Schwerin on 15 December 1909, a year after the death of his first wife Princess Elisabeth Sybille of Saxe-Weimar-Eisenach. Their marriage was childless.

== Second marriage ==
After her first husband's death in 1920, Elisabeth remarried to his half-brother, Duke Adolf Friedrich of Mecklenburg, at Ludwigslust in Grand Duchy of Mecklenburg-Schwerin. Although this marriage also remained childless, she became stepmother to Duchess Woizlawa Feodora of Mecklenburg, who at the age of 100, was the oldest living royal and the oldest living resident of Gorwihl.

== Death ==
Elisabeth died in Eutin, Schleswig-Holstein, on 16 October 1969, only two months after the death of her second husband.

== Ancestry ==
Ancestors of Princess Elisabeth of Stolberg-Rossla

16. Count Johann Martin zu Stolberg-Roßla
8. August, Count zu Stolberg-Roßla
17. Burgravine Sophie Charlotte von Kirchberg
4. Prince Karl Martin zu Stolberg-Roßla
18. Karl I, Count zu Erbach-Schönberg
9. Countess Caroline zu Erbach-Schönberg
19. Maria Nepomucena Zadubsky von Schönthal
2. Botho, Prince zu Stolberg-Roßla
20. Count Volrath zu Solms-Rödelheim und Assenheim
10. Count Carl zu Solms-Rödelheim and Assenheim
21. Countess Philippine zu Solms-Laubach
5. Countess Bertha zu Solms-Rödelheim und Assenheim
22. Gustav Ernst, Count zu Erbach-Schönberg
11. Countess Amalie zu Erbach-Schönberg
23. Countess Henriette Christiane zu Stolberg-Stolberg
1. Princess Elisabeth zu Stolberg-Rossla
24. Ernst Casimir I, Prince zu Ysenburg und Büdingen
12. Ernst Casimir II, 2nd Prince zu Ysenburg und Büdingen
25. Countess Ferdinande zu Erbach-Schönberg
6. Bruno, Prince zu Ysenburg und Büdingen
26. Albrecht, Count zu Erbach-Fürstenau
13. Countess Thekla zu Erbach-Fürstenau
27. Princess Sophie von Hohenlohe-Oehringen
3. Princess Hedwig von Ysenburg und Büdingen
28. Karl Ludwig, Prince zu Solms-Hohensolms-Lich
14. Ferdinand, Prince zu Solms-Hohensolms-Lich
29. Countess Henriette von Bentheim und Steinfurt
7. Princess Mathilde zu Solms-Hohensolms-Lich
30. Anton Octavian, Prince von Collalto and San Salvatore
15. Countess Caroline von Collalto und San Salvatore
31. Countess Karolina Apponyi de Nagy-Apponyi
