= Carl Ludwig II of Hohenlohe-Langenburg =

Carl Ludwig II

Prince of Hohenlohe-Langenburg
- Tenure: 12 April – 21 April 1860
- Predecessor: Ernst I
- Successor: Hermann
- Born: 25 October 1829; Langenburg, Kingdom of Württemberg, Germany
- Died: 16 May 1907 (aged 77); Salzburg, Austria
- Spouse: Marie Dorothea Grathwohl (m. 1861; died 1901)
- Issue: Carl, Prince of Weikersheim; Baroness Victoria of Bronn; Baroness Beatrix of Bronn
Names
- German: Karl Ludwig Wilhelm Leopold
- House: Hohenlohe-Langenburg
- Father: Ernst I, Prince of Hohenlohe-Langenburg
- Mother: Princess Feodora of Leiningen

Carl Ludwig II, 5th Prince of Hohenlohe-Langenburg (German: Karl Ludwig Wilhelm Leopold Fürst zu Hohenlohe-Langenburg; 25 October 1829 – 16 May 1907), was the eldest son of Ernst I, Prince of Hohenlohe-Langenburg. He was the fifth Prince of Hohenlohe-Langenburg.

== Early life ==
Carl Ludwig II was born at Langenburg, then in the Kingdom of Württemberg, as the first child of Ernst I, Prince of Hohenlohe-Langenburg (1794–1860; son of Karl Ludwig, Prince of Hohenlohe-Langenburg and Countess Amalie Henriette of Solms-Baruth) and his wife, Princess Feodora of Leiningen (1807–1872), daughter of Emich Carl, 2nd Prince of Leiningen and Princess Victoria of Saxe-Coburg-Saalfeld. His mother, Princess Feodora, was the half-sister of Queen Victoria. By birth, he was member of the German House of Hohenlohe.

=== Education and military career ===
After living in Dresden and Gotha for educational purposes, he studied three semesters of law at the Friedrich Wilhelm University in Berlin (1850–51). He then spent several years in Langenburg to prepare for his upcoming role as a nobleman.

It was not until the mid-1850s that he struck a military career in the Austrian army, later the Württemberg Army, although he was appointed in 1848 to Württemberg Officer.

== Prince of Hohenlohe-Langenburg ==
Upon the death of his father on 12 April 1860, Carl Ludwig inherited the title, Prince of Hohenlohe-Langenburg (German: Fürst zu Hohenlohe-Langenburg). He renounced the title on 21 April 1860 in favour of his younger brother Hermann, after he intended to marry unequally. However, he retained the title of Prince (German: Prinz).

== Marriage and issue ==
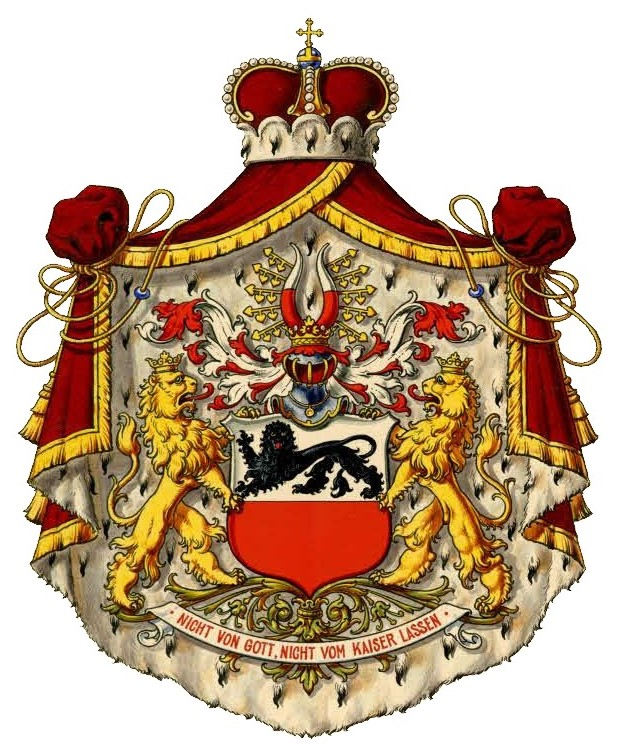
Coat of Arms of the Princes von Weikersheim in Austria (1911)

Carl Ludwig was married morganatically on 22 February 1861 in Paris to Maria Dorothea Grathwohl (1837–1901), eldest daughter of Georg Andreas Grathwohl and his wife, Friederike Meyer.

His wife, unable to share his title due to morganatic marriage, was created Baroness von Bronn in the nobility of the Kingdom of Württemberg, the title being made heritable for all their children and legitimate male-line descendants.

They had three children:

- Baron Carl von Bronn (25 January 1862 – 28 September 1925); in 1911, he was elevated to the title of Prince von Weikersheim in primogeniture by Emperor Franz Joseph I of Austria, for civil services rendered to the Austrian empire (All his descendants were made Counts and Countesses von Weikersheim. This princely title continued until the death of the 3rd Prince of Weikersheim in 1983). He married Countess Marie Aloysia Josefine Czernin von und zu Chudenitz (1879-1963) in 1899, and they had issue.
- Baroness Viktoria Feodora Sophia von Bronn (8 January 1863 – 10 October 1946), married in 1879 Ernst Ritter von Manner und Mätzelsdorf (1844-1922), no issue.
- Baroness Beatrix Adelheid Sophia von Bronn (14 October 1868 – 17 April 1932), unmarried

== Ancestry ==
Ancestors of Carl Ludwig II of Hohenlohe-Langenburg

8. Christian Albert, 2nd Prince of Hohenlohe-Langenburg
4. Karl Ludwig, 3rd Prince of Hohenlohe-Langenburg
9. Princess Caroline of Stolberg-Gedern
2. Ernst I, 4th Prince of Hohenlohe-Langenburg
10. Johann Christian II, Count of Solms-Baruth
5. Countess Amalie Henriette of Solms-Baruth
11. Countess Friederike Luise Reuss-Köstritz
1. Carl Ludwig II, 5th Prince of Hohenlohe-Langenburg
12. Carl Friedrich Wilhelm, 1st Prince of Leiningen
6. Emich Carl, 2nd Prince of Leiningen
13. Countess Christiane of Solms-Rödelheim-Assenheim
3. Princess Feodora of Leiningen
14. Francis, Duke of Saxe-Coburg-Saalfeld
7. Princess Victoria of Saxe-Coburg-Saalfeld
15. Countess Augusta Reuss of Ebersdorf

== Notes and sources ==
- Genealogisches Handbuch des Adels, Fürstliche Häuser, Reference: 1956

Carl Ludwig II, 5th Prince of Hohenlohe-Langenburg House of Hohenlohe-Langenburg Cadet branch of the House of Hohenlohe Born: 25 October 1829 Died: 16 May 1907
German nobility
Preceded by Ernst I	Prince of Hohenlohe-Langenburg; 12 April – 21 April 1860	Succeeded by Hermann
