= Duke John Albert of Mecklenburg =

German monarch and explorer

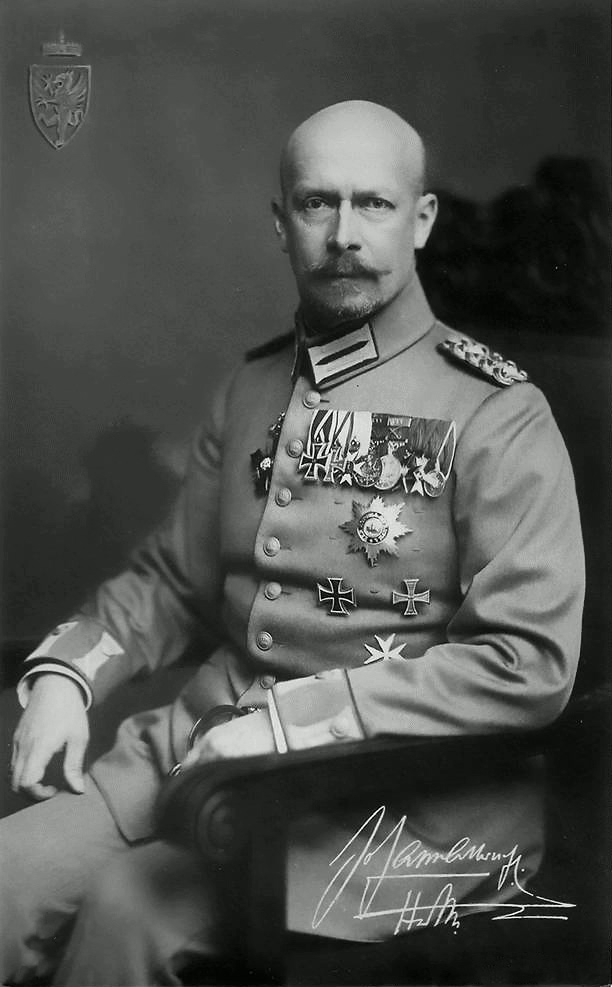
- John Albert in 1912
- Born: 8 December 1857; Schwerin, Mecklenburg-Schwerin
- Died: 20 February 1920 (aged 62); Schloß Wiligrad near Lübstorf, Germany
- Spouses: Princess Elisabeth Sybille of Saxe-Weimar-Eisenach (m. 1886; died 1908) Princess Elisabeth of Stolberg-Rossla (m. 1909)
- House: House of Mecklenburg-Schwerin
- Father: Frederick Francis II, Grand Duke of Mecklenburg
- Mother: Princess Augusta Reuss of Köstritz

Duke John Albert of Mecklenburg (German: Herzog Johann Albrecht zu Mecklenburg; given names John Albert Ernest Constantine Frederick Henry; 8 December 1857 – 16 February 1920) was a member of the House of Mecklenburg-Schwerin who served as the regent of two states of the German Empire. He was first regent of the Grand Duchy of Mecklenburg-Schwerin from 1897 to 1901 for his nephew Frederick Francis IV, Grand Duke of Mecklenburg, and thereafter regent of the Duchy of Brunswick from 1907 to 1913.

== Birth and interests ==
Duke John Albert of Mecklenburg was born in Schwerin the fifth child of Frederick Francis II, Grand Duke of Mecklenburg and his first wife Princess Augusta Reuss of Köstritz (1822–1862). Duke John Albert was educated in Dresden, pursued a career in the Prussian Army and was well known for his love of sports. He also developed an interest in Germany's colonial empire, co-founding the Pan-German League and becoming president of the German Colonial Society in 1895.

== Regencies ==
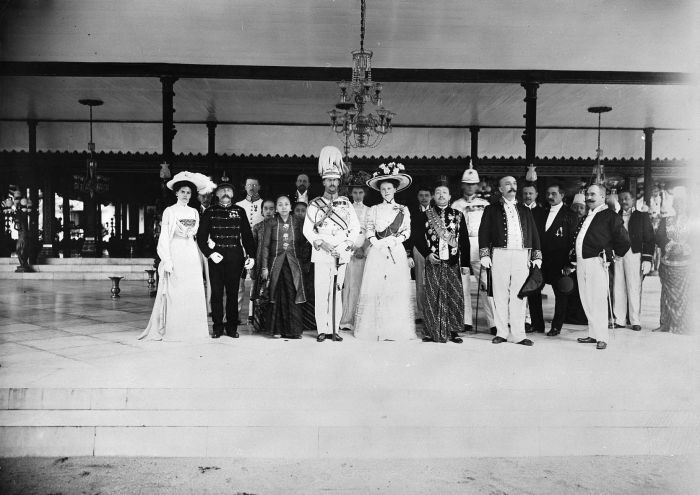
Duke John Albert of Mecklenburg, regent of the Duchy of Brunswick, during a visit to Susuhunan Pakubuwono X of Surakarta. Dutch East Indies, 1910.

Following the death of his brother Frederick Francis III, Grand Duke of Mecklenburg on 10 April 1897, Duke John Albert was appointed regent for his young nephew the new Grand Duke, Frederick Francis IV after his older brother Duke Paul Frederick had renounced his claim to the regency. He ruled as regent until his nephew came of age on 9 April 1901 and assumed personal control of the Grand Duchy.

On 28 May 1907, Duke John Albert was elected regent of the Duchy of Brunswick following the death of Prince Albert of Prussia by the state's diet, accepting the offer he arrived in Brunswick on 5 June 1907. The reason for the regency in Brunswick was that in 1884 when William, Duke of Brunswick died his distant cousin and heir Ernest Augustus, Crown Prince of Hanover was prevented from taking over the duchy because he refused to renounce his claim to the throne of the Kingdom of Hanover which had been annexed by Prussia in 1866.

Shortly after assuming the regency, Duke John Albert would walk Brunswick in civilian clothes visiting museums, libraries and other institutions in the duchy, asking questions of people to discover their living conditions. After he became too well known to walk unnoticed he established a weekly audience where people could go and present a petition to him. Duke John Albert also cut down on the expenses of the royal household by cutting the number of servants and retainers to the minimum needed to run the household.

The regency came to an end on 1 November 1913 when Ernest Augustus, Crown Prince of Hanover's son Ernest Augustus was permitted to ascend to Duchy following his marriage to Princess Victoria Louise of Prussia, the only daughter of the German Emperor, William II, which helped heal the rift between the houses of Hanover and Hohenzollern.

== War years ==
During the First World War, Duke John Albert was active with the German Colonial Society in defending Germany's colonial possessions from suggestions that they should be abandoned. On 2 September 1917 he was appointed honorary chairman of the pro-war Fatherland Party, a far-right political organization that was one of the precursors to the Nazi Party.

Duke John Albert died in 1920 in Wiligrad castle near Lübstorf aged 62.

== Marriages ==
John Albert was married twice: firstly in Weimar on 6 November 1886 to Princess Elisabeth Sybille of Saxe-Weimar-Eisenach (28 February 1854–10 July 1908) the daughter of Charles Alexander, Grand Duke of Saxe-Weimar-Eisenach; secondly in Brunswick on 15 December 1909 to Princess Elisabeth of Stolberg-Rossla (1885–1969), who following his death was to marry his half brother Duke Adolf Friedrich in 1924. Both of John Albert's marriages were childless.

== Ojimukoka ==
Ojimukoka, a small settlement, post office and railway station in Namibia, was renamed Johann - Albrechtshöhe, and then simply Albrechts in his honour.

== Honours ==
German decorations

- Mecklenburg:
  - Grand Cross of the Wendish Crown, with Collar and Crown in Ore
  - Grand Cross of the Griffon
  - Memorial Medal for Grand Duke Friedrich Franz III
  - Commemorative Medal for the Battle of Loigny-Poupry
- Baden:
  - Knight of the House Order of Fidelity, 1890
  - Knight of the Order of Berthold the First, 1890
- Bavaria: Knight of St. Hubert, 1906
- Brunswick: Grand Cross of Henry the Lion, 1898
- (Saxe-Coburg and Gotha) (Duchy of Saxe-Altenburg) (Saxe-Meiningen) Ernestine duchies: Grand Cross of the Saxe-Ernestine House Order
- Hesse-Darmstadt: Grand Cross of the Ludwig Order, 12 October 1865
- Lippe: Cross of Honour of the House Order of Lippe, 1st Class
- Oldenburg: Grand Cross of the Order of Duke Peter Friedrich Ludwig, with Collar
- Kingdom of Prussia:
  - Knight of Honour of the Johanniter Order, 15 February 1884
  - Knight of the Black Eagle, with Collar
  - Grand Cross of the Red Eagle
- Reuss: Cross of Honour 1st Class
- Saxe-Weimar-Eisenach: Grand Cross of the White Falcon, 1878
- Saxony: Knight of the Rue Crown
- Württemberg: Grand Cross of the Württemberg Crown, 1892

Foreign decorations

- Emirate of Bukhara: Order of the Star of Bukhara, 1st Class
- Principality of Bulgaria:
  - Grand Cross of St. Alexander, with Collar
  - Grand Cross of Military Merit
  - Knight of Saints Cyril and Methodius
- Denmark: Knight of the Elephant, 9 June 1898
- Kingdom of Greece: Grand Cross of the Redeemer
- Empire of Japan:
  - Grand Cordon of the Order of the Chrysanthemum, 23 July 1894
  - Grand Cordon of the Rising Sun, with Paulownia Flowers
- Netherlands:
  - Grand Cross of the Netherlands Lion
  - Wedding Medal of Queen Wilhelmina and Duke Henry of Mecklenburg-Schwerin, 1901
- Ottoman Empire:
  - Order of Glory
  - Order of Osmanieh, 1st Class
- (Tunisia) Beylik of Tunis: Grand Cordon of the Order of Glory
- Persian Empire: Order of the Lion and the Sun, 1st Class
- Kingdom of Portugal: Grand Cross of the Tower and Sword
- Kingdom of Romania: Grand Cross of the Order of Carol I, with Collar
- Russian Empire:
  - Knight of St. Andrew
  - Knight of St. Vladimir, 1st Class
  - Knight of St. George, 1st Class
- (Thailand) Siam:
  - Knight of the Order of the Royal House of Chakri
  - Grand Cross of the Crown of Siam
- Sweden-Norway: Knight of the Seraphim, 18 September 1897
- Sultanate of Zanzibar: Order of the Brilliant Star of Zanzibar, 1st Class

== Ancestry ==
Ancestors of Duke John Albert of Mecklenburg

8. Frederick Louis, Hereditary Grand Duke of Mecklenburg-Schwerin
4. Paul Frederick, Grand Duke of Mecklenburg-Schwerin
9. Grand Duchess Elena Pavlovna of Russia
2. Frederick Francis II, Grand Duke of Mecklenburg-Schwerin
10. Frederick William III of Prussia
5. Princess Alexandrine of Prussia
11. Duchess Louise of Mecklenburg-Strelitz
1. Duke John Albert of Mecklenburg
12. Prince Heinrich XLIV Reuss of Köstritz
6. Heinrich LXIII, Prince Reuss of Köstritz
13. Baroness Wilhelmine of Geuder genannt Rabensteiner
3. Princess Augusta Reuss of Köstritz
14. Count Henry of Stolberg-Wernigerode
7. Countess Eleonore of Stolberg-Wernigerode
15. Princess Jenny of Schonburg-Waldenburg
