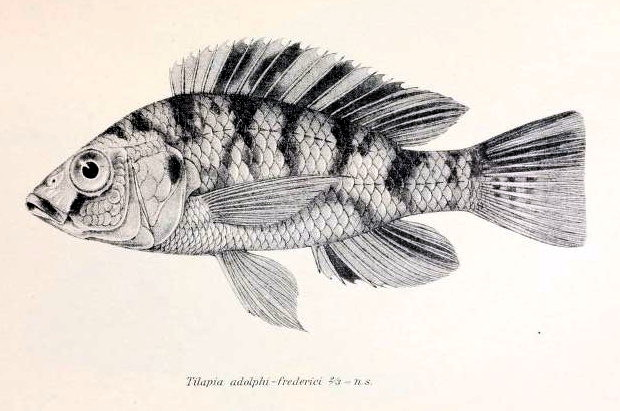

Scientific classification
- Kingdom: Animalia
- Phylum: Chordata
- Class: Actinopterygii
- Order: Cichliformes
- Family: Cichlidae
- Genus: Haplochromis
- Species: H. adolphifrederici

Binomial name
- Haplochromis adolphifrederici (Boulenger, 1914)

Synonyms
- Tilapia adolphifrederici Boulenger, 1914; Haplochromis murakoze Coenen, Snoeks & Thys van den Audenaerde, 1984

= Haplochromis adolphifrederici =

Species of fish

Haplochromis adolphifrederici is a species of haplochromine cichlid which is endemic to Lake Kivu. It is an insectivorous, maternal mouthbrooder. The specific name honours Duke Adolf Friedrich of Mecklenburg (1873-1969) the German explorer in Africa, a colonial politician and leader of a scientific research expedition in the region of the Central African Graben which traversed Africa from east to west, during which type was collected.
