= Heinrich XXVII, Prince Reuss Younger Line =

Heinrich XXVII
- Prince Reuss Younger Line
- Heinrich XXVII c. 1913

Prince Reuss of Gera
- Reign: 29 March 1913 – 11 November 1918
- Predecessor: Heinrich XIV
- Successor: Monarchy abolished
- Born: 10 November 1858; Gera, Reuss Younger Line
- Died: 21 November 1928 (aged 70); Gera, Weimar Republic
- Spouse: Princess Elise of Hohenlohe-Langenburg (m. 1884)
- Issue Detail: Viktoria, Duchess Adolf Friedrich of Mecklenburg-Schwerin; Princess Luise Adelheid; Prince Heinrich XL; Prince Heinrich XLIII; Heinrich XLV, Hereditary Prince Reuss Younger Line
Names
- German: Heinrich
- House: House of Reuss Younger Line
- Father: Heinrich XIV, Prince Reuss Younger Line
- Mother: Duchess Agnes of Württemberg

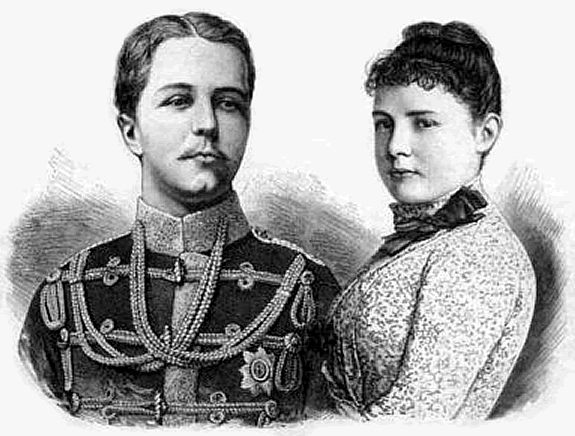
Prince Heinrich XXVII and his wife Princess Elise of Hohenlohe-Langenburg.

Heinrich XXVII, Prince Reuss Younger Line (German: Heinrich XXVII Fürst Reuß jüngere Linie; 10 November 1858 – 21 November 1928) was the last reigning Prince Reuss Younger Line from 1913 to 1918. Then he became Head of the House of Reuss Younger Line from 1918 to 1928.

== Early life ==
Heinrich was born at Gera, into the Reuss of Schleiz, younger branch of an ancient House of Reuss, as the eldest child of Heinrich XIV, Prince Reuss Younger Line, (son of Heinrich LXVII, Prince Reuss Younger Line, and Princess Adelheid Reuss-Ebersdorf) and his wife, Duchess Agnes of Württemberg, daughter of Duke Eugen of Württemberg and Princess Helene of Hohenlohe-Langenburg.

He attended the Vitzthum'sche Gymnasium school in Dresden and then studied in 1879 and 1880 at the University of Bonn and University of Leipzig. From 1879, he was a member of the Corps Borussia Bonn. After completing his studies, he continued his military career in the Hussar Guard Regiment of the Prussian Army, becoming a captain and then squadron commander. On 18 October 1891, Heinrich retired from the regiment to become an army officer, and he held the rank of General of the Cavalry from 13 September 1911. During World War I, he helped command the XI Corps.

In the Principality of Reus-Gera in which his family reigned, Heinrich ran the government with his father since 1892 and assumed full control from 1908, though he became Prince once his father died. He was considered more conservative than his father and was involved in the building of the Princely Court Theatre of Gera, which opened in 1902, in addition to multiple other theatres. Moreover, from 1911 to 1913, Heinrich overlooked the renovations of the Osterstein Castle of Gera and the construction of the new west wing. In addition to running the government of his family's principality, he also contributed to governmental affairs in the Principality of Reuss-Greiz due to the disabled incapacity of its Prince Heinrich XXIV.

== Prince Reuss Younger Line ==
At the death of his father on 29 March 1913, Heinrich inherited the throne of the Principality, becoming Heinrich XXVII. He also continued as regent of Reuss-Greiz, because of a physical and mental disability of Prince Heinrich XXIV due to an accident in his childhood.

As a state of the German Empire, Heinrich XXVII saw his principality enter the First World War under Kaiser Wilhelm II on the side of the Central Powers. On 10 November 1918, on his 60th birthday, Heinrich was forced to abdicate as a result of the German Revolution. He remained financially unaffected by this and was allowed to keep his residences, even cheerfully attending a theatre performance days after his abdication.

== Life in exile and death ==
In December 1919, the People's State of Reuss and Heinrich's family agreed on the division of the former principality's domain assets. 5394 hectares of land went to the state, including Schleiz Castle, Hirschberg Castle and Tinz Castle, whereas Heinrich was allowed to keep 10,820 hectares and multiple other castles. In exile, Heinrich became the honorary chairman of the Reuss Institute for Art and Public Welfare, to which the court theatre that he built was soon transferred.

With Heinrich XXIV's death in 1927, the Greiz/Elder Line became extinct and its titles passed to Heinrich XXVII, who thus became the sole Prince Reuss. However, Heinrich died shortly after his 70th birthday in November 1928 at Osterstein Castle. He was initially laid to rest in the castle's Chapel, but was then transferred to Schleiz and buried there on 26 November 1928 in his family's crypt in the Mountain Church of Saint Mary. His wife survived him by only four months.

== Marriage and issue ==
Heinrich XXVII married his second cousin (both great-grandchildren of Karl Ludwig, Prince of Hohenlohe-Langenburg) on 11 November 1884 at Langenburg to Princess Elise of Hohenlohe-Langenburg, member of the House of Hohenlohe, second child and elder daughter of Hermann, Prince of Hohenlohe-Langenburg, and his wife, Princess Leopoldine of Baden.

They had five children:

- Princess Viktoria Feodora Reuss of Schleiz (21 April 1889 – 18 December 1918), married in 1917 to Duke Adolf Friedrich of Mecklenburg-Schwerin, Governor of Togo. She died on childbirth after giving birth to a daughter:
  - Duchess Woizlawa Feodora of Mecklenburg (17 December 1918 – 3 June 2019), married in 1939 to her distant relative, Prince Heinrich I Reuss of Schleiz-Köstritz (1910−1982), adopted son (1935) of her maternal uncle, Heinrich XLV, Hereditary Prince Reuss Younger Line
- Princess Luise Reuss of Schleiz (17 July 1890 – 12 August 1951), never married.
- Prince Heinrich XL Reuss of Schleiz (17 September 1891 – 4 November 1891), died as an infant.
- Prince Heinrich XLIII Reuss of Schleiz (25 July 1893 – 13 May 1912), never married.
- Heinrich XLV, Hereditary Prince Reuss Younger Line (13 May 1895 – 1945), went missing in 1945, declared dead 31 December 1953/5 January 1962.

== Death ==
Heinrich XXVII died in Gera, on 21 November 1928, aged 70. He is buried in the Reuss family mausoleum, in the park of Schloss Ebersdorf, Thuringia, Germany.

== Notes and sources ==
- The Royal House of Stuart, London, 1969, 1971, 1976, Addington, A. C., Reference: II 221,223
- Genealogisches Handbuch des Adels, Fürstliche Häuser, Reference: 1956

Heinrich XXVII, Prince Reuss Younger Line House of Reuss Younger Line Cadet branch of the House of Reuss Born: 10 November 1858 Died: 21 November 1928
Regnal titles
Preceded by Heinrich XIV	Prince Reuss Younger Line; 1913 – 1918	Succeeded by Principality abolished
Preceded by Heinrich XIV	Regent of Reuss Elder Line; 1913 – 1918	Succeeded by Principality abolished
Titles in pretence
Loss of title	— TITULAR — Prince Reuss Younger Line; 1918 – 1927; Reason for succession failure: Principality abolished in 1918	Succeeded by Merged with Reuss Elder Line
Preceded by Merged with Reuss Elder Line	— TITULAR — Prince Reuss; 1927 – 1928; Reason for succession failure: Principality abolished in 1918	Succeeded by Heinrich XLV
