= Ernstbrunn =

- Municipality
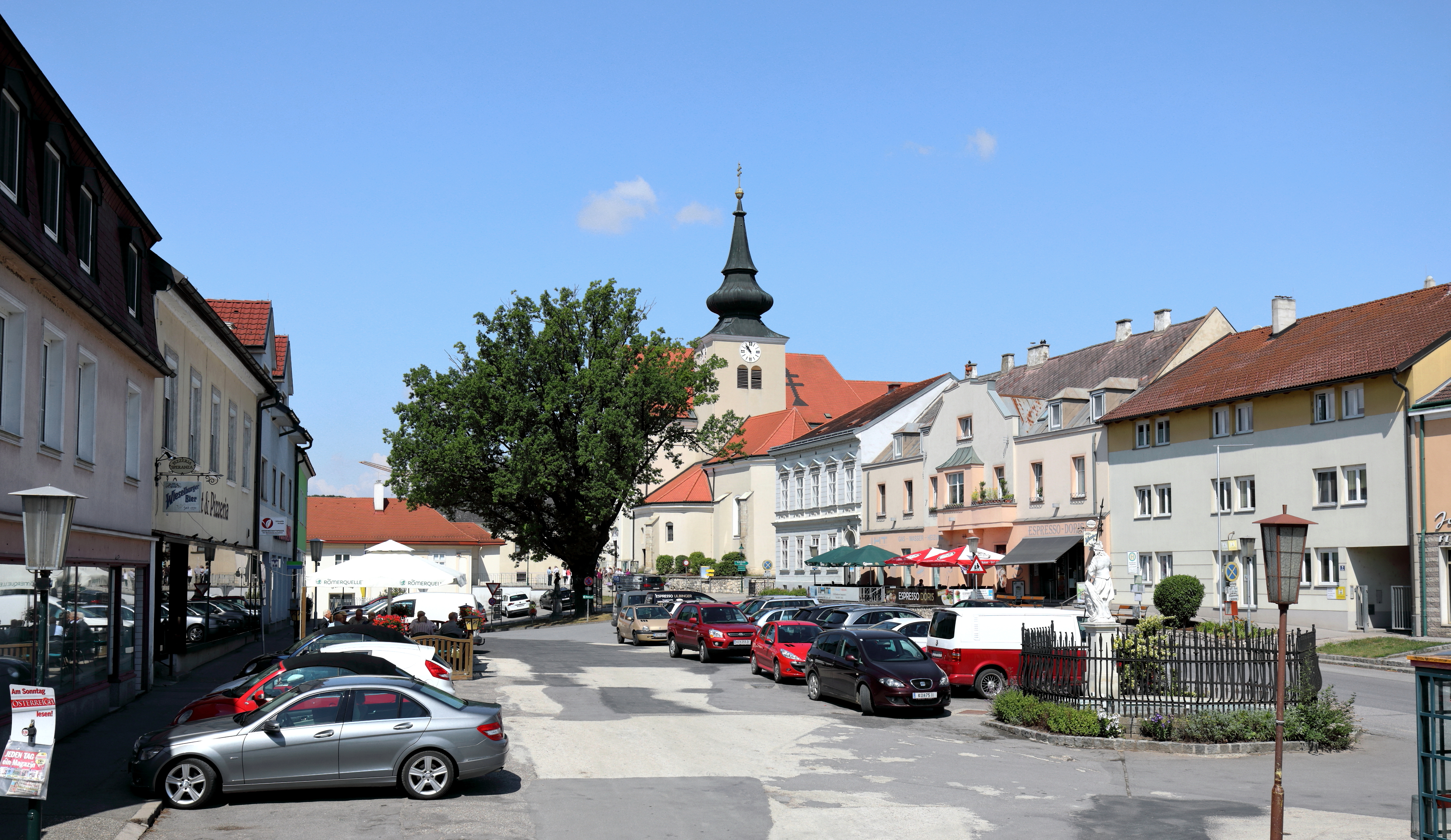

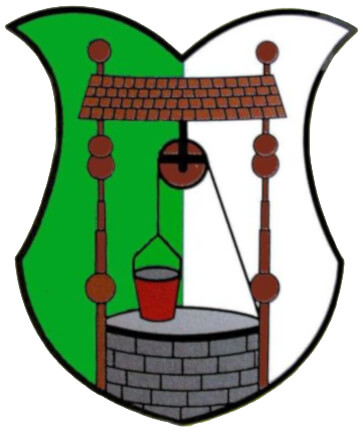
- Coat of arms

- Location within Austria
- Coordinates: 48°32′N 16°22′E
- Country: Austria
- State: Lower Austria
- District: Korneuburg

Government
  - Mayor: Horst Gangl

Area
  - Total: 80.71 km^{2} (31.16 sq mi)
- Elevation: 293 m (961 ft)

Population (2018-01-01)
  - Total: 3,213
  - Density: 39.81/km^{2} (103.1/sq mi)
- Time zone: UTC+1 (CET)
  - Summer (DST): UTC+2 (CEST)
- Postal code: 2115
- Area code: 02576
- Website: www.ernstbrunn.gv.at

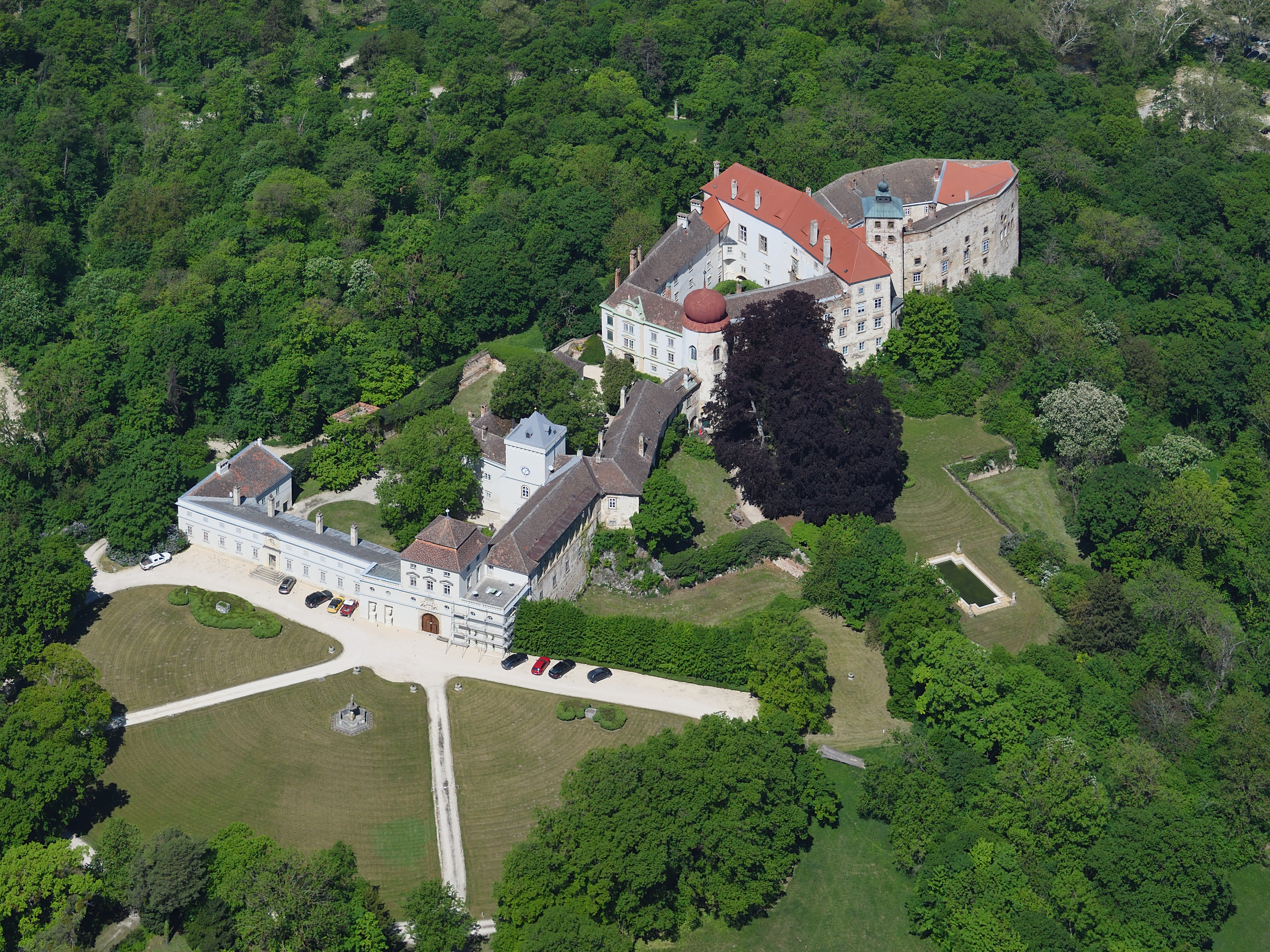
Ernstbrunn Castle

Ernstbrunn is a town in the district of Korneuburg in Lower Austria in Austria. Ernstbrunn takes up about 80.69 square kilometers, 26.99 percent of which is forest.

The castle became the seat of the Ernstbrunn branch of the Counts of Sinzendorf in 1592. After the last Sinzendorf died in 1822, it was inherited by the Köstritz branch of the ruling princely House of Reuss of whom it remains their main family seat until today.

== Population ==
Historical population
Year	Pop.	±%
1869	3,425	—
1880	3,614	+5.5%
1890	3,823	+5.8%
1900	3,073	−19.6%
1910	4,354	+41.7%
1923	4,254	−2.3%
1934	4,359	+2.5%
1939	4,204	−3.6%
1951	4,129	−1.8%
1961	3,531	−14.5%
1971	3,298	−6.6%
1981	3,000	−9.0%
1991	2,941	−2.0%
2001	3,141	+6.8%
2011	3,085	−1.8%
2021	3,272	+6.1%
