= Princess Leopoldine of Baden =

Leopoldine
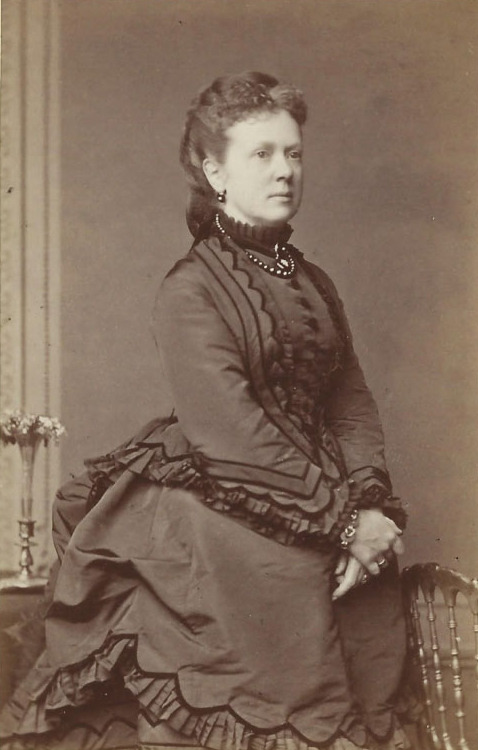

Princess consort of Hohenlohe-Langenburg
- Tenure: 24 September 1862 – 23 December 1903
- Born: 22 February 1837; Karlsruhe, Grand Duchy of Baden
- Died: 23 December 1903 (aged 66); Strasbourg, German Empire
- Burial: Langenburg
- Spouse: Hermann, Prince of Hohenlohe-Langenburg (m. 1862)
- Issue Detail: Ernst II, Prince of Hohenlohe-Langenburg; Princess Elise of Hohenlohe-Langenburg; Feodora, Princess of Leiningen
Names
- Leopoldine Wilhelmine Amalie Pauline Maximiliane
- House: Zähringen
- Father: Prince William of Baden
- Mother: Duchess Elisabeth Alexandrine of Württemberg

Princess Leopoldine of Baden (Leopoldine Wilhelmine Amalie Pauline Maximiliane; 22 February 1837, Karlsruhe – 23 December 1903, Strasbourg) was a Princess of Baden by birth and Princess of Hohenlohe-Langenburg by marriage.

== Life ==
Leopoldine was the fourth and youngest daughter of Prince William of Baden (1792–1859) and Duchess Elisabeth Alexandrine of Württemberg (1802–1864), daughter of Duke Louis of Württemberg. Her paternal grandparents were Charles Frederick of Baden, the first Grand Duke of Baden, and his second wife, Baroness Louise Caroline Geyer of Geyersberg, Countess of Hochberg. She grew up in Karlsruhe, together with her two older sisters, Sophie (1834–1904) and Elizabeth (1835–1891).

Princess Leopoldine married on 24 September 1862 in Karlsruhe, Prince Hermann of Hohenlohe-Langenburg (1832–1913), second son of Prince Ernst I, Prince of Hohenlohe-Langenburg, and Princess Feodora of Leiningen. They had three children:

- Prince Ernest William Frederick Maximilian Charles of Hohenlohe-Langenburg (1863–1950); succeeded his father as Ernst II, married in 1896 Princess Alexandra of Saxe-Coburg and Gotha (1878–1942), had issue.
- Princess Elise Victoria Feodora Sophie Adelheid of Hohenlohe-Langenburg (1864–1929); married in 1884 Heinrich XXVII, Prince Reuss Younger Line (1858–1928), had issue.
- Princess Feodora of Hohenlohe-Langenburg (1866–1932); married in 1894 Emich, 5th Prince of Leiningen (1866–1939), had issue, including Princes Karl and Hermann.

Princess Leopoldine founded the Leopoldine Association. In Strasbourg, where her husband was appointed as the Governor of Alsace-Lorraine, she took mainly ceremonial duties. She died the day before Christmas Eve 1903, after a long illness. She was buried in the family cemetery in Langenburg.

== Ancestry ==
Ancestors of Princess Leopoldine of Baden

8. Frederick, Hereditary Prince of Baden-Durlach
4. Charles Frederick, Grand Duke of Baden
9. Princess Amalia of Nassau-Dietz
2. Prince William of Baden
10. Ludwig Heinrich, Baron Geyer of Geyersberg
5. Baroness Louise Caroline Geyer of Geyersberg
11. Countess Maximiliana Christiane of Sponeck
1. Princess Leopoldine of Baden
12. Frederick II Eugene, Duke of Württemberg
6. Duke Louis of Württemberg
13. Margravine Friederike of Brandenburg-Schwedt
3. Duchess Elisabeth Alexandrine of Württemberg
14. Charles Christian, Prince of Nassau-Weilburg
7. Princess Henriette of Nassau-Weilburg
15. Princess Carolina of Orange-Nassau
