= Hermann, Prince of Hohenlohe-Langenburg =

Hermann
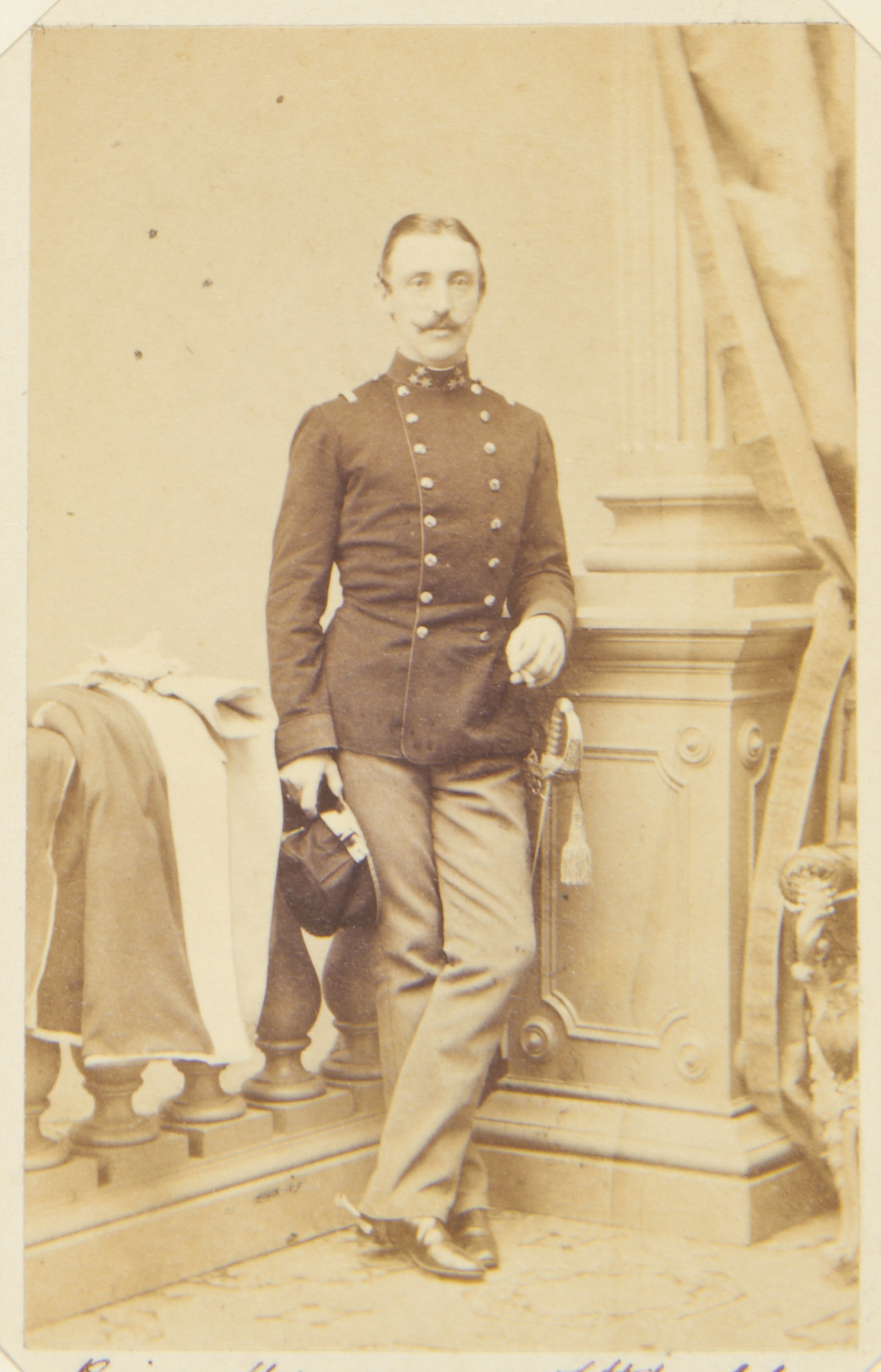
- Hermann c. 1860

Prince of Hohenlohe-Langenburg
- Tenure: 21 April 1860 – 9 March 1913
- Predecessor: Carl Ludwig II
- Successor: Ernst II
- Born: 31 August 1832; Langenburg, Kingdom of Württemberg
- Died: 9 March 1913 (aged 80); Langenburg, Kingdom of Württemberg
- Spouse: Princess Leopoldine of Baden (m. 1862; died 1903)
- Issue: Ernst II, Prince of Hohenlohe-Langenburg; Princess Elise; Feodora, Princess of Leiningen
Names
- German: Hermann Ernst Franz Bernhard
- House: Hohenlohe-Langenburg
- Father: Ernst I, Prince of Hohenlohe-Langenburg
- Mother: Princess Feodora of Leiningen

Hermann, Prince of Hohenlohe-Langenburg (Hermann Ernst Franz Bernhard; 31 August 1832 – 9 March 1913) was the 6th Prince of Hohenlohe-Langenburg and the second son of Ernst I, Prince of Hohenlohe-Langenburg, and Princess Feodora of Leiningen (half-sister of Queen Victoria).

He succeeded to the title of Prince of Hohenlohe-Langenburg (Fürst zu Hohenlohe-Langenburg) on 21 April 1860, when his elder brother signed over his rights to the throne. He died on 9 March 1913 in Langenburg, Kingdom of Württemberg (present-day Baden-Württemberg, Germany).

== Life and career ==
From 5 November 1894 to 1 October 1907 he served as Imperial Lieutenant of Alsace-Lorraine, succeeding his kinsman Prince Chlodwig of Hohenlohe-Schillingsfürst.

On 19 September 1899, he and his wife were in a saloon railway carriage at Perth Station. Lieutenant Colonel H A Yorke (RE retired), the Inspecting Officer of Railways who reported on the accident, said that they had had a miraculous escape from injury when another train collided with the stationary train in which they were standing.

== Marriage and children ==
On 24 September 1862 at Karlsruhe, he married Princess Leopoldine of Baden, daughter of Prince William of Baden.

They had three children (one son and two daughters):

- Ernst II, Prince of Hohenlohe-Langenburg (13 September 1863 – 11 December 1950) — He married Princess Alexandra of Saxe-Coburg and Gotha on 20 April 1896. They had five children.
- Princess Elise of Hohenlohe-Langenburg (4 September 1864 – 18 March 1929) — She married Heinrich XXVII, Prince Reuss Younger Line on 11 November 1884. They had five children.
- Princess Feodora Viktoria Alberta of Hohenlohe-Langenburg (23 July 1866 – 1 November 1932) — She married her second cousin (both being great-grandchildren of Princess Victoria of Saxe-Coburg-Saalfeld and her first husband Emich Karl, Prince of Leiningen), Emich, 5th Prince of Leiningen, on 12 July 1894. They had five children.

== Honours ==
He received the following orders and decorations:

- (Saxe-Coburg and Gotha) (Duchy of Saxe-Altenburg) (Saxe-Meiningen) Ernestine duchies: Grand Cross of the Saxe-Ernestine House Order, 1858
- Baden:
  - Knight of the House Order of Fidelity, 1862
  - Grand Cross of the Zähringer Lion, 1862
  - Knight of the Military Karl-Friedrich Merit Order, 1871
- Württemberg:
  - Grand Cross of the Württemberg Crown, 1867
  - Knight of the Order of Olga, 1889
- United Kingdom:
  - Honorary Grand Cross of the Bath (civil), 8 May 1867
  - Honorary Grand Cross of the Royal Victorian Order, 14 August 1907
- Kingdom of Bavaria: Knight of St. Hubert, 1868
- (Principality of Schaumburg-Lippe) Lippe: Cross of Honour of the House Order of Lippe, 1st Class
- Mecklenburg: Grand Cross of the Wendish Crown, with Crown in Ore
- Kingdom of Saxony: Knight of the Rue Crown
- Kingdom of Prussia:
  - Grand Cross of the Red Eagle, 19 February 1876
  - Knight of the Black Eagle, with Collar
  - Grand Commander's Cross of the Royal House Order of Hohenzollern
  - Iron Cross (1870), 1st Class and 2nd Class on White Band with Black Edge
  - Red Cross Medal, 1st Class
  - Commander of the Johanniter Order
- Luxembourg: Knight of the Gold Lion of Nassau, 17 February 1897

== Ancestry ==
Ancestors of Hermann, Prince of Hohenlohe-Langenburg

8. Christian Albert, 2nd Prince of Hohenlohe-Langenburg
4. Karl Ludwig, 3rd Prince of Hohenlohe-Langenburg
9. Princess Caroline of Stolberg-Gedern
2. Ernst I, 4th Prince of Hohenlohe-Langenburg
10. Johann Christian II, Count of Solms-Baruth
5. Countess Amalie Henriette of Solms-Baruth
11. Countess Friederike Reuss-Köstritz
1. Hermann, 6th Prince of Hohenlohe-Langenburg
12. Carl Friedrich Wilhelm, 1st Prince of Leiningen
6. Emich Carl, 2nd Prince of Leiningen
13. Countess Christiane of Solms-Rödelheim and Assenheim
3. Princess Feodora of Leiningen
14. Francis, Duke of Saxe-Coburg-Saalfeld
7. Princess Victoria of Saxe-Coburg-Saalfeld
15. Countess Augusta Reuss-Ebersdorf

== Literature ==
- Kurt Eißele: Fürst Hermann zu Hohenlohe-Langenburg als Statthalter im Reichsland Elsass-Lothringen 1894–1907. O.O., 1950
- Günter Richter: Hermann Fürst zu Hohenlohe-Langenburg. In: Neue Deutsche Biographie (NDB). Vol 9, Duncker & Humblot, Berlin, 1972, p. 491 et suiv.

Hermann, 6th Prince of Hohenlohe-Langenburg House of Hohenlohe-Langenburg Cadet branch of the House of Hohenlohe Born: 31 August 1832 Died: 9 March 1913
German nobility
Preceded by Carl Ludwig II	Prince of Hohenlohe-Langenburg; 21 April 1860 – 9 March 1913	Succeeded by Ernst II
