= Princess Feodora of Leiningen =

German princess (1807–1872)

Feodora of Leiningen
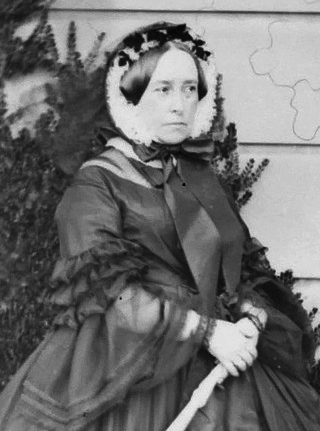
- Photograph of Princess Feodora

Princess consort of Hohenlohe-Langenburg
- Tenure: 18 February 1828 – 12 April 1860
- Born: 7 December 1807; Amorbach, Kingdom of Bavaria, Confederation of the Rhine
- Died: 23 September 1872 (aged 64); Baden-Baden, Grand Duchy of Baden, German Empire
- Spouse: Ernst I, Prince of Hohenlohe-Langenburg (m. 1828; died 1860)
- Issue: Carl Ludwig II, Prince of Hohenlohe-Langenburg; Princess Elise; Hermann, Prince of Hohenlohe-Langenburg; Prince Victor; Adelheid, Duchess of Schleswig-Holstein; Feodora, Duchess of Saxe-Meiningen
Names
- German: Anna Feodora Auguste Charlotte Wilhelmine; English: Anne Theodora Augusta Charlotte Wilhelmina
- House: Leiningen
- Father: Emich Karl, Prince of Leiningen
- Mother: Princess Victoria of Saxe-Coburg-Saalfeld

Princess Feodora of Leiningen (Anna Feodora Auguste Charlotte Wilhelmine; 7 December 1807 – 23 September 1872) was the only daughter of Emich Karl, Prince of Leiningen and Princess Victoria of Saxe-Coburg-Saalfeld, future Duchess of Kent. Feodora and her older brother Karl, Prince of Leiningen, were maternal half-siblings of Queen Victoria of the United Kingdom.

== Life ==
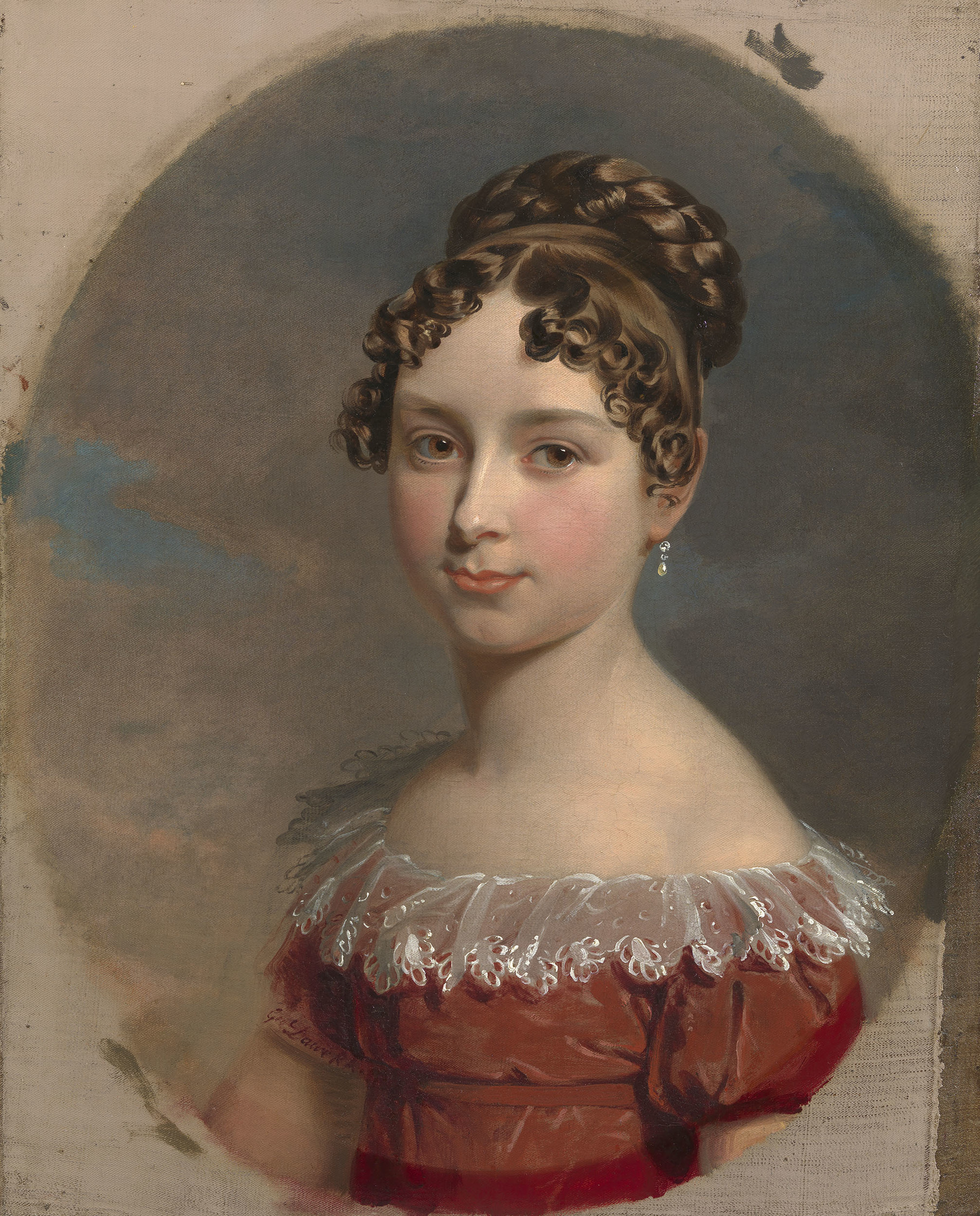
Portrait of Princess Feodora in 1818

Feodora was born in Amorbach, Bavaria, on 7 December 1807 to Princess Victoria of Saxe-Coburg-Saalfeld and her first husband, Emich Karl, Prince of Leiningen. She received her first two names from her maternal aunt, Grand Duchess Anna Feodorovna of Russia, who was born Princess Juliane of Saxe-Coburg-Saalfeld but received the name Anna Feodorovna following her conversion to Eastern Christianity, for her marriage to Grand Duke Konstantin Pavlovich of Russia in 1796. Feodora's father died in 1814.

On 29 May 1818, her mother remarried to Prince Edward Augustus, Duke of Kent and Strathearn, the fourth son of King George III. The following year, when the duchess's pregnancy was reaching full term, the household moved so that Victoria, a potential heir to the British throne, would be born in Britain.

After Victoria's birth, Feodora resided at Kensington Palace and was tutored by Victoria's governess Baroness Lehzen. Her stepfather the Duke died in January 1820, and her mother fell under the influence of John Conroy, a British army officer who administered the household. Conroy and the Duchess implemented the Kensington System which aimed to isolate Victoria from the world and influences other than them. Feodora found life there very stifling. With no friends her own age she became rebellious in her behaviour.

Feodora was generally regarded as headstrong, attractive, and well-mannered. Despite having no personal fortune, she was considered desirable for marriage due to being the sister of the future Queen.

Among her suitors was Augustus d'Este, who first proposed to her on 2 December 1825 while on a visit to Coburg. Augustus's proposal was rejected by Feodora, but he continued his attempts to court her by sending letters and a gold ring. Feodora again rejected his suit and declined the gift of the ring.

Another man who showed an interest was William, Duke of Nassau.

All these potential matches were blocked by Conroy, who found Feodora's presence a threat to the Duchess's influence over Victoria. He therefore advised that Feodora be married to a German prince of no particular importance.

Feodora enjoyed a very close relationship with her younger half-sister Victoria, who too was devoted to her, although Victoria resented the fact that Feodora was one of only a few other children with whom she was allowed regular interaction. Despite their closeness, Feodora was eager to leave their residence at Kensington Palace permanently, as her "only happy time was driving out" with Victoria and Lehzen, when she could "speak and look as she liked".

=== Marriage and later life ===
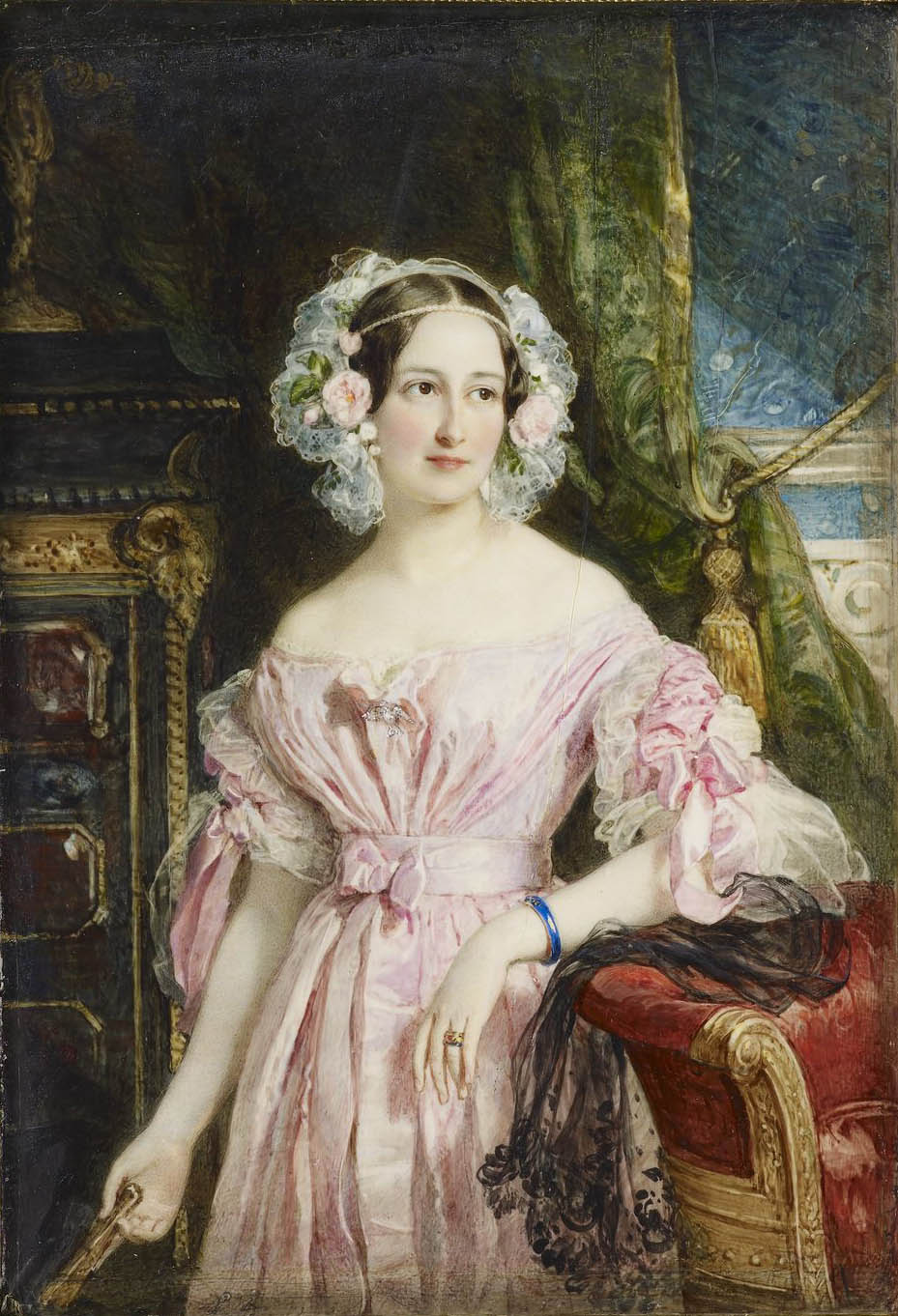
Portrait of Princess Feodora of Hohenlohe-Langenburg by William Ross c. 1838

In early 1828, Feodora married Ernst I, Prince of Hohenlohe-Langenburg (1794–1860), at Kensington Palace. The match was arranged by Queen Adelaide of Great Britain, as Prince Ernst I was her first cousin. Prior to that, she had only met him twice. After their honeymoon, she returned to the German Confederation, where she lived until her death in 1872. The prince had no domain, however, as the principality had been mediatised to Württemberg in 1806. The couple lived in a large and uncomfortable castle, Schloss Langenburg.

Feodora maintained a lifelong correspondence with her half-sister Victoria, and was granted an allowance of £300 (equivalent to £33,360 in 2024) whenever she could visit Britain. She was a member of the royal party at Victoria's coronation in 1838.

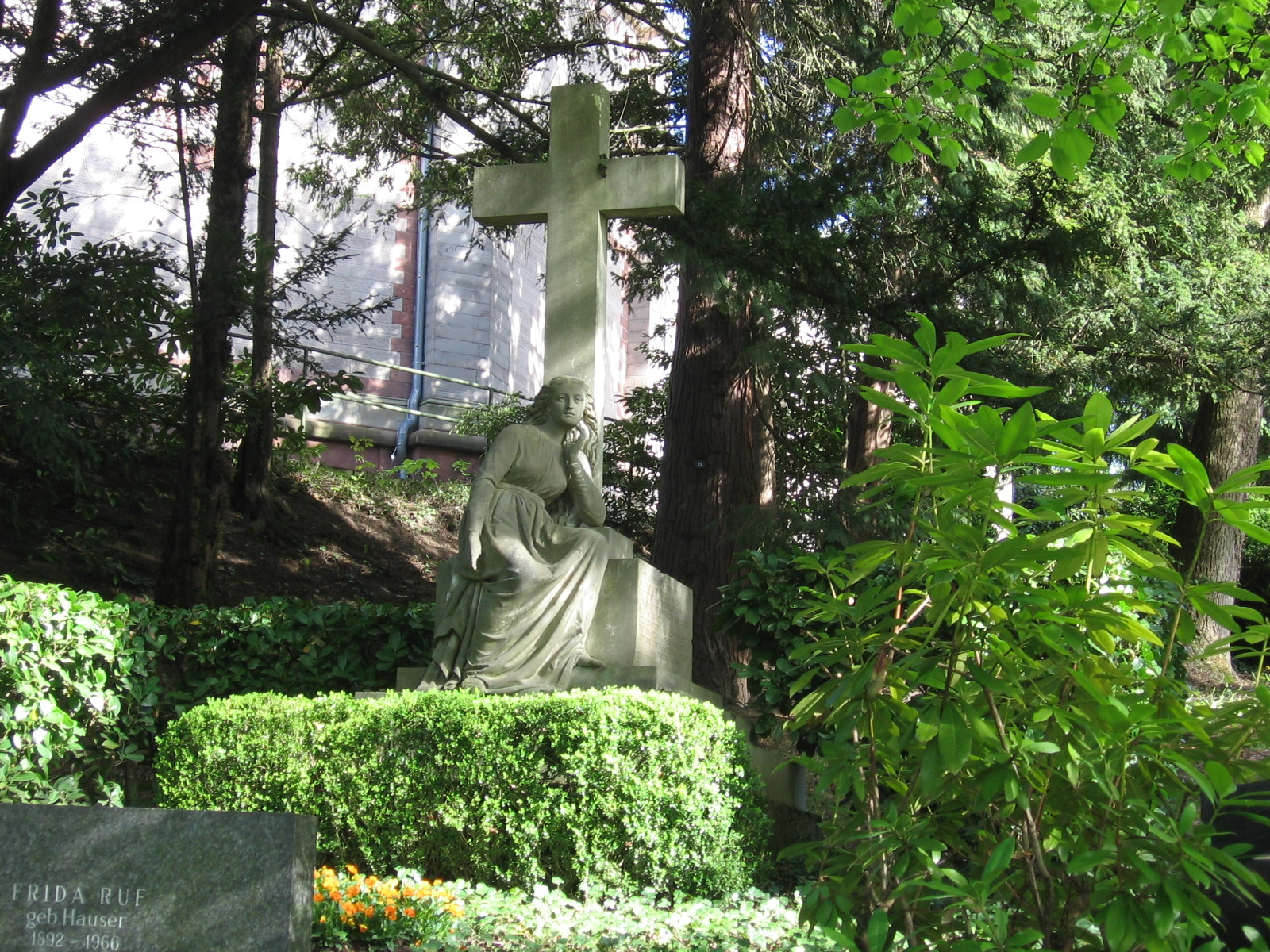
Sculpture on the tomb of Princess Feodora of Hohenlohe-Langenburg in Baden-Baden by an unknown sculptor (1872)

Feodora's youngest daughter, the Duchess of Saxe-Meiningen, died in early 1872 of scarlet fever. Feodora died later that year. On hearing of Feodora's death, Victoria wrote:

"Can I write it? My own darling, only sister, my dear excellent, noble Feodore is no more! She is at rest & in peace since 2 this morning. What a fearful loss! Darling precious sister, whom I hoped so to go & see! The kind Empress Augusta telegraphed the news to me in a most feeling manner, & I got the telegram just after I came back from Abergeldie, where I had gone to see the preparations for Bertie's welcome. This was to have been & is still a day of rejoicing for all the good Balmoral people, on account of dear Bertie's first return after his illness, & I am here in sorrow & grief, unable to join in the welcome. God's will be done, but the loss to me is too dreadful! I stand so alone now, no near & dear one nearer my own age, or older, to whom I could look up to, left! All, all gone! How good & wise, beloved Feodore was, so devoted to me, so truly pious & religious. She is gone to that world she was so fit for & entered it, just sleeping away. What a blessed end! but what a loss to those who are left! She was my last near relative on an equality with me, the last link with my childhood & youth."

— Queen Victoria in her journal (23 September 1872)

== Issue ==
Feodora and Ernest had six children, three sons, and three daughters:

- Carl Ludwig II, Prince of Hohenlohe-Langenburg (25 October 1829 – 16 May 1907), succeeded his father on 12 April 1860, but abdicated his rights on 21 April to marry unequally. He married Maria Grathwohl on 22 February 1861. They had three children. His male issue was created Prince of Weikersheim on 18 July 1911 by Emperor Franz Joseph.
- Princess Elise of Hohenlohe-Langenburg (8 November 1830 – 27 February 1850) died aged 19.
- Hermann, Prince of Hohenlohe-Langenburg (31 August 1832 – 9 March 1913) married Princess Leopoldine of Baden on 24 September 1862. They had three children.
- Prince Victor of Hohenlohe-Langenburg (11 December 1833 – 31 December 1891) married morganatically Lady Laura Seymour on 24 January 1861. They had four children.
- Princess Adelheid of Hohenlohe-Langenburg (20 July 1835 – 25 January 1900) married Frederick VIII, Duke of Schleswig-Holstein-Sonderburg-Augustenburg on 11 September 1856. They had five children.
- Princess Feodora of Hohenlohe-Langenburg (7 July 1839 – 10 February 1872) married George II, Duke of Saxe-Meiningen on 23 October 1858. They had three sons.

== In the media ==
In ITV's television programme Victoria series 3 (2018), Feodora (played by Kate Fleetwood) is portrayed as a scheming, jealous sister who has fled Langenburg and refuses to return to her home. This interpretation is not supported by the historical record.

== Ancestry ==
Ancestors of Princess Feodora of Leiningen

8. Friedrich Magnus, Count of Leiningen-Dagsburg-Hardenburg
4. Carl Friedrich Wilhelm, Prince of Leiningen
9. Countess Anna Christine Eleonore of Wurmbrand-Stuppach
2. Emich Carl, Prince of Leiningen
10. Wilhelm Karl Ludwig, Count of Solms-Rödelheim-Assenheim
5. Countess Christiane Wilhelmine of Solms-Rödelheim-Assenheim
11. Countess Maria Anna Magdalena of Wurmbrand-Stuppach
1. Princess Feodora of Leiningen
12. Ernest Frederick, Duke of Saxe-Coburg-Saalfeld
6. Francis, Duke of Saxe-Coburg-Saalfeld
13. Duchess Sophie Antoinette of Brunswick-Wolfenbüttel
3. Princess Victoria of Saxe-Coburg-Saalfeld
14. Heinrich XXIV, Count Reuss of Ebersdorf
7. Countess Augusta Reuss of Ebersdorf
15. Countess Karoline Ernestine of Erbach-Schönberg
