= Principality of Reuss-Gera =

Former sovereign state in western Europe

County of Reuss-Schleiz-Gera (1802–1802) Grafschaft Reuß-Schleiz-Gera Principality of Reuss-Schleiz-Gera (1806–1848) Fürstentum Reuß-Schleiz-Gera Principality of Reuss Junior Line (1848–1918) Fürstentum Reuß jüngerer Linie
- 1802–1918
- Flag Coat of arms
- Motto: Ich bau auf Gott (German for 'I rely on God')
- Anthem: Heil unserm Fürsten, Heil! "Hail to our Prince, Hail!" Instrumental rendition in B major
- Reuss-Gera within the German Empire

- Reuss-Gera within Thuringia
- Capital: Gera
- Government: Principality
- Prince
  - 1806–1818: Heinrich XLII
  - 1818–1854: Heinrich LXII
  - 1854–1867: Heinrich LXVII
  - 1867–1913: Heinrich XIV
  - 1913–1918: Heinrich XXVII
- Minister of State
  - 1825–1839: Gustav von Strauch (first)
  - 1918: Paul Ruckdeschel (last)
- History
  - Established: 1802
  - Raised to principality: 9 April 1806
  - Union of line of Junior Reuss: 1848
  - Disestablished: 11 November 1918
Preceded by
Reuss-Lobenstein-Ebersdorf
Reuss-Schleiz
Reuss-Gera
Succeeded by
PSR
- Today part of: Germany

The Principality of Reuss-Gera (German: Fürstentum Reuß-Gera), officially called the Principality of Reuss Junior Line (German: Fürstentum Reuß jüngerer Linie) after 1848, was a sovereign state in modern Germany, ruled by members of the House of Reuss. It was one of the successor states of the Imperial County of Reuss. The Counts Reuss, with their respective capitals and Residenzen at Gera, Schleiz, Lobenstein, Köstritz and Ebersdorf, were all elevated to the title of prince (Fürst) in 1806. Their successor branch heads shared that title, while their cadets were also each titled prince (Prinz). Thus all males of the family were properly "Prince Heinrich (Roman numeral) Reuss, J.L.", without use of a nobiliary particle, although for convenience their branch names remained in colloquial use (for example, "Prince Heinrich I Reuss of Köstritz").

== Territory ==
The territories of four separate branches of the Junior Line amalgamated between 1824 and 1848, at which time the senior branch of Gera retained sovereignty over the surviving cadet branches, which retained succession rights to the princely throne. In 1905, the principality of Reuss Junior Line had an area of 827 km^{2} (319 square miles) and a population of 145,000, with Gera as its capital.

In the aftermath of World War I, the territory of the Junior Line merged with that of the Elder Line in 1919 as the People's State of Reuss, which became part of the new state of Thuringia on 1 May 1920.

== The princely house ==
The House of Reuss practises a unique system of naming and numbering the male members of the family, every one of whom for centuries has borne the name "Heinrich", followed by a Roman numeral. While most royal and noble houses assign a regnal number only to the ruling head of the house, and that in the sequential order of their reigns, the Reuss Junior Line ("Reuss, J.L.") used a numbering sequence for all male family members which began afresh with the first son born in each century. The male children within a single nuclear family need not bear sequential numbers, as all members of the larger family share the common numbering system. For example, the sons of Prince Heinrich LXVII Reuss of Schleiz, in order of their births, were named Heinrich V, Heinrich VIII, Heinrich XI, Heinrich XIV, and Heinrich XVI, with their male-line kinsmen holding the numerals in between according to the order of their births. In consequence of this naming system, certain heads of the Reuss Junior Line have had the highest numbers attached to their name of any European ruling families. The designation of "Junior Line" was dropped in 1930; the Elder Line ("Reuss, A.L.") had become extinct as its last male member, Heinrich XXIV, renounced his rights as sovereign in 1918 and died unmarried in 1927.

In 1927 Heinrich XXIV, Prince Reuss of Greiz died and his titles passed to Heinrich XXVII, who became the 1st Prince Reuss and died the next year. His heir Heinrich XLV was arrested in August 1945 in Ebersdorf by the Soviet military and disappeared. On 5 January 1962 he was declared dead in absentia and Heinrich IV, Prince Reuss of Köstritz inherited his rights.

== Counts of Plauen ==
One of the younger sub-lines of the branch which ruled the Reuss, J.L. until 1918, includes the "Counts of Plauen" from the late 19th century. When Prince Heinrich XXVI Reuss (1857–1913) married Countess Viktoria von Fürstenstein (1863–1949) in 1885, under the strict marriage rules then enforced by the Reuss dynasty, although he was but a younger son of a minor ruling family, their children were not allowed to bear the dynasty's princely title. They were, instead, designated "Counts of Plauen", although they remained in the line of succession to the two thrones of Reuss. The Fürstensteins lacked Uradel status: Viktoria's paternal grandfather, Pierre-Alexandre Le Camus (1774–1824), son of a minor noble French notary living in Martinique, rose to become foreign minister in Jerome Bonaparte's Kingdom of Westphalia, was ennobled there in 1807 and made a count of the Kingdom of France in 1817.

When the German Empire collapsed at the end of World War I, the reigning Prince Reuss lost his crown along with all the other monarchs whose realms were within Germany. In 1927, Henrich XXVI's son, known as Count Heinrich Harry of Plauen (1890–1951), was adopted by his childless uncle, Prince Heinrich XXX (1864–1939), and the now-deposed dynasty agreed to accept him as "Prince Heinrich Harry Reuß", along with those of his male-line descendants born of unions complying with the family's 1902 rules that permitted marriages to countesses (Heinrich Harry's wife, Huberta von Tiele-Winckler was only a baroness in her own right, but belonged to a family of comital rank in Prussia). Their son Heinrich Enzio was thus accepted by the House of Reuss as a prince, but his own marriage to Baron Gustaf Peyron's daughter in 1949 occurred before the Reuss family conference of 1957 which lowered the marital standard again, allowing dynastic inter-marriage with baronial families.

In 1992, Prince Heinrich Ruzzo of Reuss, Count of Plauen, a prince of the former sovereign House of Reuss, married Anni-Frid Lyngstad, a former lead singer of the popular 1970s Swedish musical group ABBA. Since her marriage to the prince, she has held the titles of Princess Reuss and Countess of Plauen with the style of Her Serene Highness. Heinrich Ruzzo died of lymphoma on October 29, 1999, leaving her the titles of Dowager Princess and Countess. She currently resides in Genolier in the Canton of Vaud, Switzerland. She has shared a home since 2020 with her British partner, Henry Smith, 5th Viscount Hambleden.

Since 1999 the House of Reuss has recognized Prince Heinrich Ruzzo Reuss of Plauen (German: Heinrich Ruzzo, Prinz Reuß von Plauen) by his formal title, though without official membership in the dynasty or entitlement to the traditional style of Serene Highness. Under German law the title has been allowed only as part of the surname since 1919, thus the name "Heinrich Ruzzo Prinz Reuss."

=== Princes of Reuss-Gera and Counts of Plauen ===
- Heinrich I, Count of Reuss-Schleiz 1666–1692 (1639–1692)
  - Heinrich XI, Count of Reuss-Schleiz 1692–1726 (1669–1726)
    - Heinrich I, Count of Reuss-Schleiz 1726–1744 (1695–1744)
    - Heinrich XII, Count of Reuss-Schleiz 1744–1784 (1716–1784)
      - Heinrich XLII, 1st Prince of Reuss-Schleiz 1784–1818 (1752–1818), raised to princely status in 1806
        - Heinrich LXII, 2nd Prince 1818–1854 (1785–1854)
        - Heinrich LXVII, 3rd Prince 1854–1867 (1789–1867)
          - Heinrich XIV, 4th Prince 1867–1913 (1832–1913)
            - Heinrich XXVII, 1st Prince Reuss 1913–1928 (1858–1928), monarchy abolished in 1918, inherited Reuss-Greiz in 1927
              - Heinrich XLV, 2nd Prince Reuss 1928–1962 (1895–1962), went missing in 1945, declared dead in absentia in 1962
  - Heinrich XXIV, Count of Reuss-Köstritz 1692–1748 (1681–1748)
    - Heinrich VI, Count of Reuss-Köstritz 1748–1783 (1707–1783)
      - Heinrich XLIII, 1st Prince of Reuss-Köstritz 1783–1814 (1751–1814)
        - Heinrich LXI, Hereditary Prince of Reuss-Köstritz (1784–1813)
        - Heinrich LXIV, 2nd Prince of Reuss-Köstritz 1814–1856 (1787–1856)
      - Heinrich XLVIII, Prince of Reuss-Köstritz (1759–1825)
        - Heinrich LXIX, 3rd Prince of Reuss-Köstritz 1856–1878 (1792–1878)
    - Heinrich IX, Prince of Reuss-Köstritz (1711–1780)
      - Heinrich XLIV, Prince of Reuss-Köstritz (1753–1832)
        - Heinrich LXIII, Prince of Reuss-Köstritz (1786–1841)
          - Heinrich IV, 4th Prince of Reuss-Köstritz 1878–1894 (1821–1894)
            - Henry XXIV, 5th Prince of Reuss-Köstritz 1894–1910 (1855–1910)
              - Heinrich XXXIX, 6th Prince of Reuss-Köstritz 1910–1946 (1891–1946)
                - Heinrich IV, 3rd Prince Reuss 1946–2012 (1919–2012), took title in 1962
                  - Heinrich XIV, 4th Prince Reuss 2012–present (born 1955)
                    - (1) Heinrich XXIX, Hereditary Prince Reuss (born 1997)
                    - (2) Prince Heinrich V (born 2012)
                - Prince Heinrich VII (1927–2002)
                  - (3) Prince Heinrich XIX of Köstritz (born 1974)
                  - (4) Prince Heinrich XXII of Köstritz (born 1976)
          - Heinrich VII, Lord of Trebschen (1825–1906)
            - Heinrich XXXII, Lord of Trebschen (1878–1935), died childless
            - Heinrich XXXIII, Lord of Trebschen (1879–1942)
              - Heinrich II, Lord of Trebschen (1916–1993)
            - Heinrich XXXV, Lord of Trebschen (1887–1936)
              - Heinrich V, Lord of Trebschen (1921–1980)
                - (5) Prince Heinrich XXVIII Ico of Trebschen (born 1964)
          - Heinrich XII, Lord of Stonsdorf (1829–1866)
            - Heinrich XXVIII, Lord of Stonsdorf (1859–1924)
              - Heinrich XXXIV, Lord of Stonsdorf (1887–1956), line extant (6–20)
                - Heinrich I, Lord of Stonsdorf (1910–1982), line extant (6–18)
                  - (6) Heinrich VIII, Lord of Stonsdorf (born 1944), line extant (7–8)
                  - (13) Heinrich XIII, line extant (14)
          - Heinrich XIII, Lord of Baschkow (1830–1897), childless
          - Heinrich XV, Lord of Klipphausen (1834–1869), died without sons
        - Heinrich LXXIV, Lord of Jänkendorf and Neuhoff (1798–1886)
          - Heinrich IX, Lord of Jänkendorf and Neuhoff (1827–1898)
            - Heinrich XXVI, Count of Plauen (1857–1913), line extant (21–32)
          - Heinrich XXV, Lord of Groß-Krauscha (1856–1911), line extinct
    - Heinrich XXIII, Prince of Reuss-Köstritz (1722–1787), line extant (33–36)

== Other notable figures ==
=== Reuss zu Köstritz – jüngerer Linie ===
- Princess Augusta Reuss of Köstritz (1822–1862), Grand Duchess of Mecklenburg-Schwerin
- Princess Eleonore Reuss of Köstritz (1860–1917), Tsaritsa Consort of Bulgaria
- Princess Magdalena Reuss of Köstritz (1920–2009), wife of Prince Hubertus of Prussia

=== Reuss zu Greiz – ältere Linie ===
- Princess Hermine Reuss of Greiz (1887–1947), widow of Prince Johann of Schönaich-Carolath and second wife of Wilhelm II, German Emperor
