= Imperial County of Reuss =

Principality within the Holy Roman Empire (c. 1010 – 1778/1806)

Imperial County of Reuss Reichsgrafschaft Reuß (German)
- c. 1010 – 1778/1806
- Flag Coat of arms

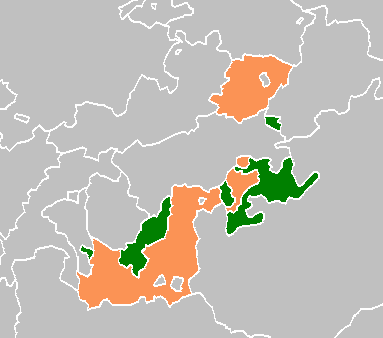
- Reuss in 1820: Elder (green) and Younger (orange) line
- Status: County
- Capital: Weida until 1531, then Plauen, Gera and Greiz
- Government: Principality
- Historical era: Middle Ages
  - Established: c. 1010
  - Partitioned to R.-Gera, R-Plauen and R-Weida: c. 1206
  - Partitioned into Elder, Middle and Younger line: 1564
  - Principality of Reuss Elder Line: 1778
  - Principality of Reuss Junior Line: 1806
Preceded by	Succeeded by
Vogtland	Principality of Reuss-Greiz; Principality of Reuss-Gera

Reuss (German: Reuß [ˈʁɔʏs]) was the name of several historical states located in present-day Thuringia, Germany. Several lordships of the Holy Roman Empire which arose after 1300 and became Imperial Counties from 1673 and Imperial Principalities in the late 18th century were ruled by the House of Reuss.

A varying number of these counties came into being by partition; they were partially merged and divided again. After the end of the empire in 1806, the principality of the elder line, as well as several of the younger, became sovereign member states of the German Confederation, with the younger ones merging into a unified principality by 1848. The two remaining territories became federal principalities of the German Empire in 1871, the Principality of Reuss Elder Line with the state capital of Greiz and the Principality of Reuss Younger Line with the state capital of Gera. Both states were ruled by the House of Reuss until the German Revolution of 1918–1919. Reuss had a non-contiguous area of 1,143 square kilometers (441 square miles) and 211,324 inhabitants in 1919. The head of each branch bore the German title Fürst (Prince, as head of a princely house) while their children and all other members of the house bore the title Prinz/Prinzessin (Prince/Princess, as agnate members of a princely house).

Since the end of the 12th century, all male members of the House of Reuss have been named Heinrich (English: Henry) in honour of Henry VI, Holy Roman Emperor (1190–1197), to whom they owed the dominions of Weida and Gera. For the purpose of differentiation, they are given ordinal numbers according to certain systems (see numbering of the Heinrichs), and in private life they are distinguished by nicknames.

== History of the various states ==
Several different principalities of the House of Reuss which had previously existed had by the time of the formation of the German Confederation become part of the two remaining lines (the Elder and the Younger lines). Before then, they had been part first of the Holy Roman Empire, and then the Confederation of the Rhine.

=== Origins ===
The region including what would become the Principality of Reuss was inhabited in early medieval times by Slavic people who were converted to Christianity by the German Emperor Otto I (936–973). In church matters the region was under the Diocese of Zeitz (founded in 968), which became a suffragan of Magdeburg. On account of the frequent inroads of the Slavs, the residence of the Bishop of Zeitz was removed to Naumburg in 1028, after which the See was called Naumburg-Zeitz.

Upon its subjection to German authority, the whole province was allotted to the March of Zeitz. As early as the year 1000, however, Emperor Otto III permitted the entire part lying on the eastern boundary of Thuringia, a wooded area, sparsely populated by the West Slavic people of the Sorbs, to be cleared for farmland and settled by German settlers. Emperor Henry IV appointed Henry the Pious of Gleissberg (c. 1040−1120) imperial vogt, or bailiff (advocatus imperii) of this settlement area, under the rule of the imperial Quedlinburg Abbey. He was a son of Erkenbert I of Weida, the oldest known ancestor of the family, who is mentioned in 1122 in the entourage of Count Adalbert of Everstein at the consecration of St John's church in Plauen. The name of the area Heinrich controlled derives from his office: Vogtland (Terra advocatorum, Land of the Bailiff). This designation has remained to this day a geographical summary for a region of 3,467 km^{2} which is located in Saxony, Thuringia and, to a lesser extent, in northern Bavaria.

=== The House of the Vogts (Bailiffs) ===
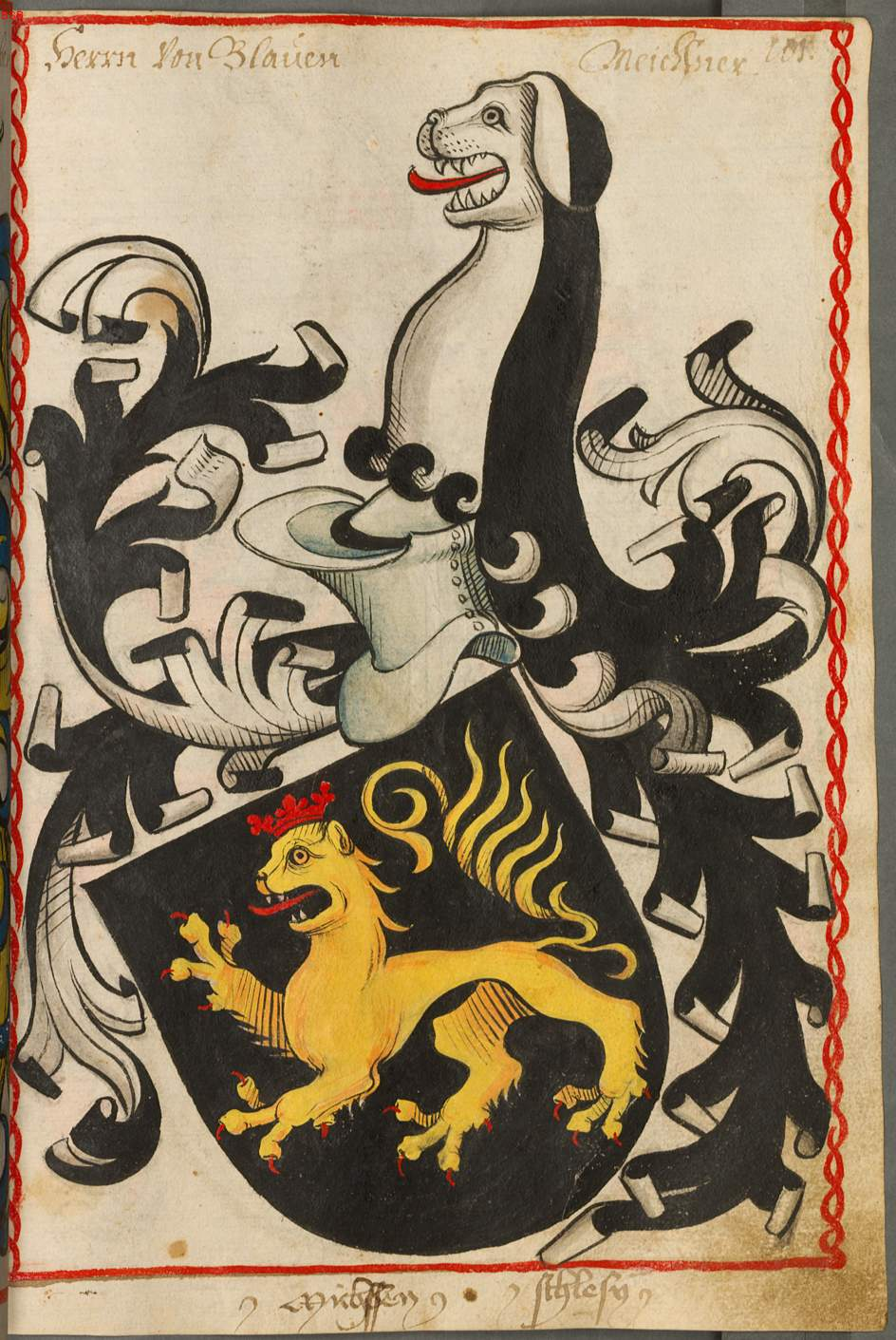
Coat-of-arms of the Vogts of Gera (1370), since the mid 15th century also of the Vogts of Plauen and the Lords Reuss of Plauen

The position of vogt (bailiff) soon became hereditary. While the dominions of Heinrich von Gleissberg included the towns Gera and Weida, his grandson Henry II the Rich (d. before 1209) also acquired Plauen. When his three sons divided their inheritance, three independent areas emerged, ruled by the branches of the bailiffs of Weida-Ronneburg, Plauen-Gera and Greiz-Reichenbach. The bailiffs, initially unfree nobles (Ministerialis), quickly rose to the rank of lords. After the division, the official title Vogt was carried on by all branches and passed on like a hereditary imperial fiefdom. When the bailiffs negotiated a treaty with Henry III, Margrave of Meissen in 1254, they acted as equal partners. In 1329 Emperor Ludwig the Bavarian confirmed the bailiffs a rank equal to Princes of the Holy Roman Empire, albeit without the title itself, they continued to use the designation Vogt.

In the 12th and 13th centuries, the bailiffs of Weida gradually became independent of the Quedlinburg Abbey on the lands they administered. Their area included what is generally understood today as Vogtland, largely in the present-day federal state of Thuringia, with a small part in the Free State of Bavaria. Over time the dominions of the bailiffs extended beyond the Vogtland into the Western Ore Mountains, with areas extending into what is now the Czech Republic. This cross-border Vogtland, as it is still called today, and whose territories ruled by the vogts fluctuated over the centuries, covers 1338 square miles.

The Weida branch was extinct in 1535, the branch of Greiz-Reichenbach was soon inherited by the branch of Plauen-Gera which then divided into Plauen (elder and younger line) and Gera-Schleiz-Lobenstein (extinct in 1550). The elder Plauen line of the vogts was extinct in 1380. The founder of the younger Plauen line was Henry (d. about 1300), who on account of his stay in Eastern European regions and his marriage to a granddaughter of King Daniel of Galicia received the surname of "der Reusse" ("the Russian"); the name became hereditary and subsequently passed to the family's holdings. His descendants were styled Lords Reuss of Plauen, Greiz and Gera. The House of Reuss is thus descended from the vogts of Plauen from whom they inherited the cities and lordships of Gera, Greiz, Schleiz and Lobenstein. However, in the fourteenth and fifteenth centuries the vogts had lost the greater part of their possessions, most of which fell to the Electorate of Saxony, including Weida in 1427 and Plauen in 1482.

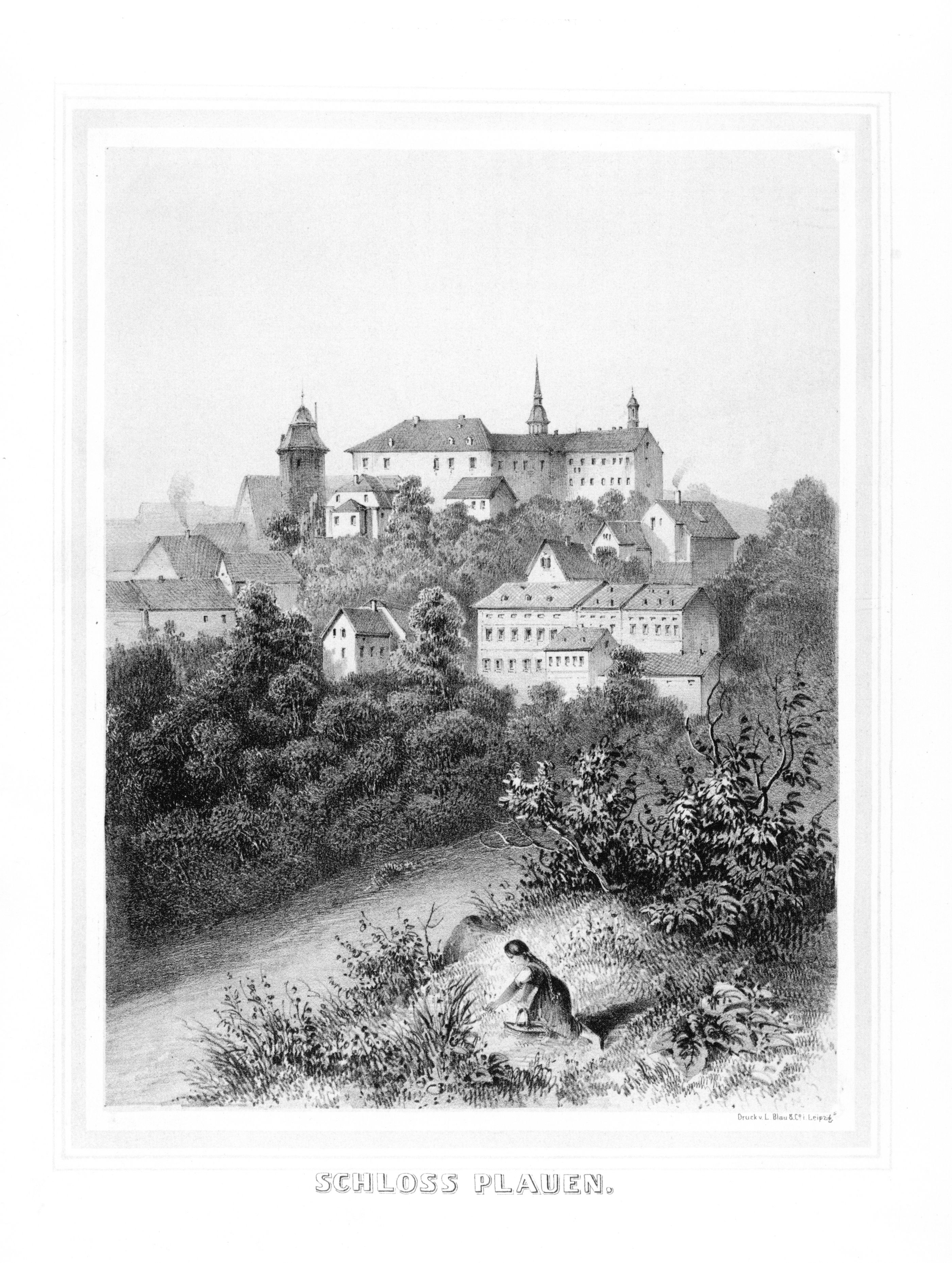
Plauen city and castle (1859)

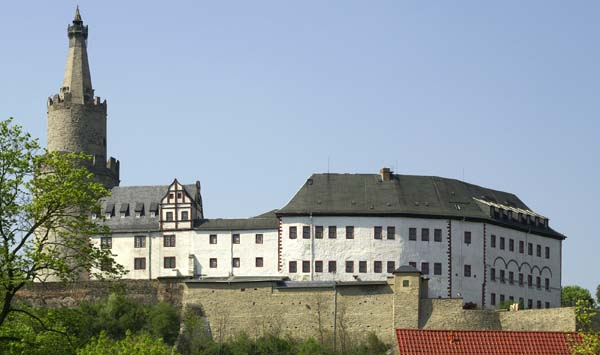
Osterburg Castle at Weida

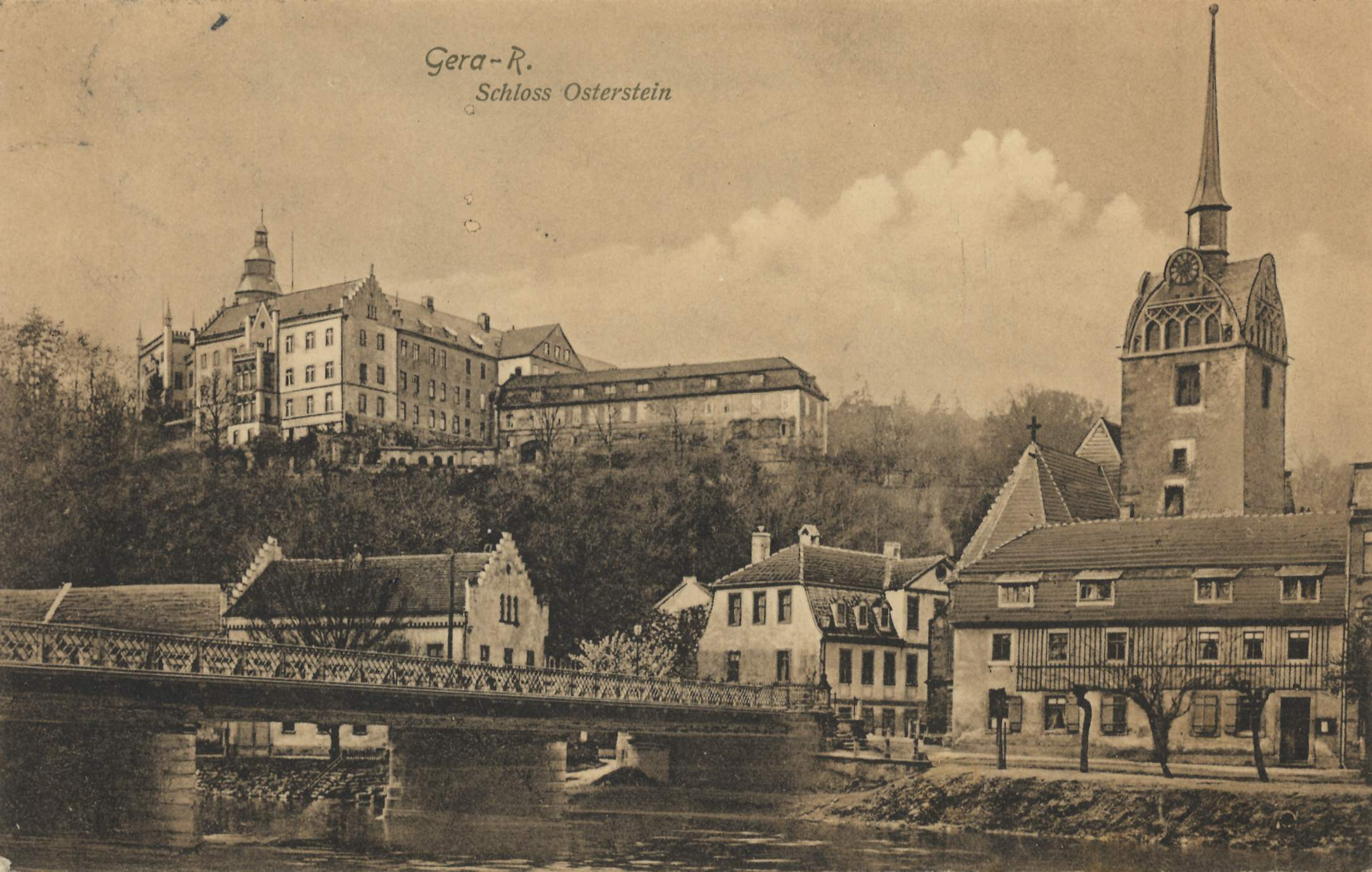
Osterstein Castle at Gera (until 1918 state capital of the Principality of Reuss Younger Line)

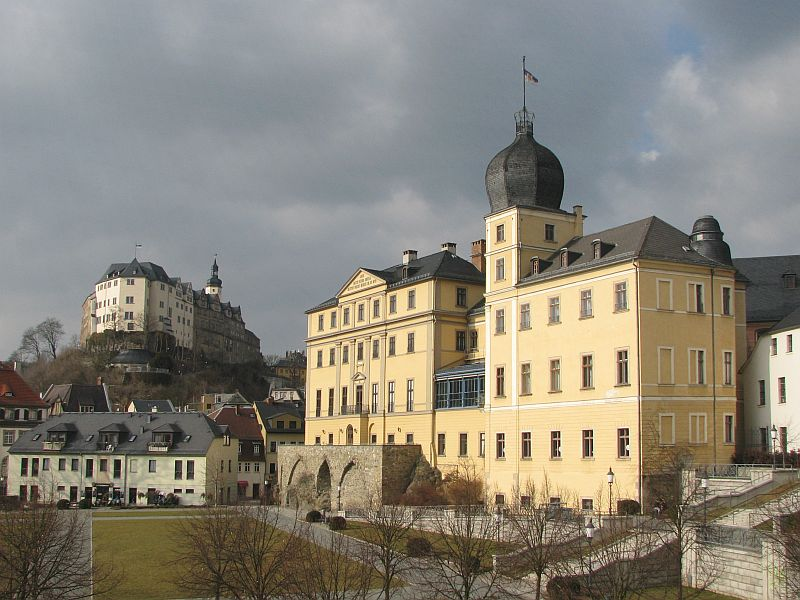
Greiz with Upper and Lower Castle (until 1918 state capital of the Principality of Reuss Elder Line)

=== House of Reuss ===
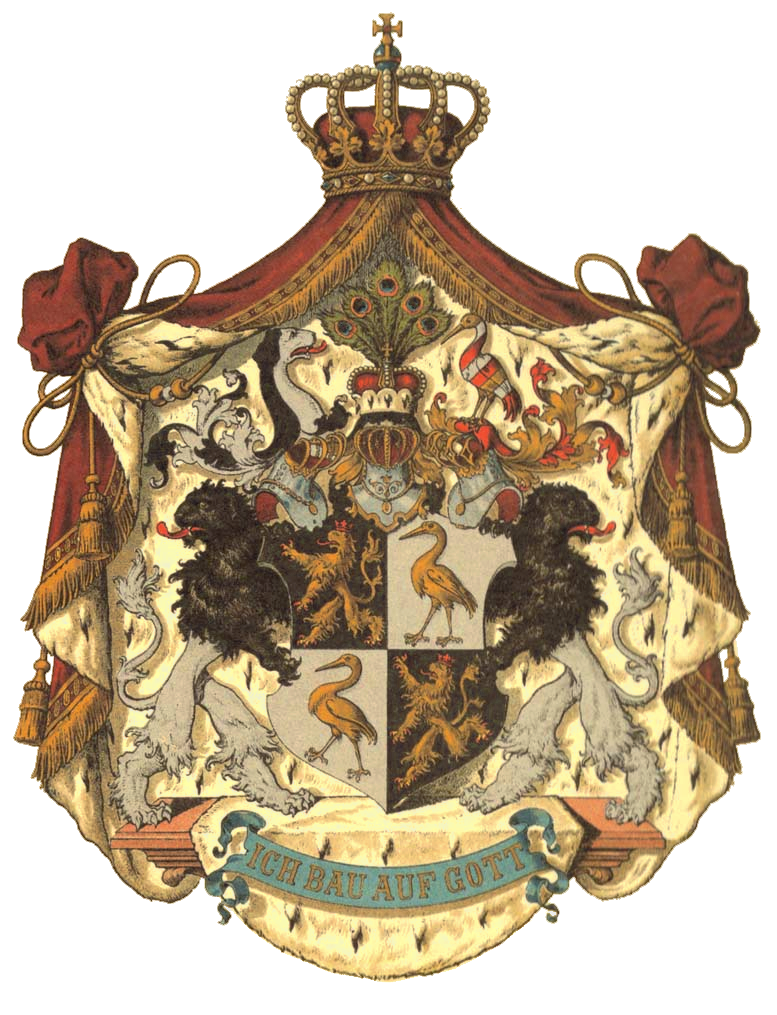
Coat-of-arms of the princely House of Reuss (younger line)

In 1306 the Plauen branch of the vogts was subdivided into an elder line (at Plauen) that died out around 1380, and a younger line (at Greiz and Reichenbach), called Reuss. In 1564 the latter was subdivided into three branches, the Elder (extinct in 1927), the Middle (extinct in 1616), and the Younger (of which the ruling line became extinct in 1945) and a side line, split off in 1692, Reuss-Köstritz, which had been raised to (however, non-ruling) princes in 1806, still exists with about 30 male relatives, all named Heinrich, as the last surviving branch of the family, with the senior of this branch, the Prince Reuss-Köstritz, as head of the entire house, hence now The Fürst Reuss, while the others hold the agnatic title of prince.

In 1673 the Lords Reuss were raised to Imperial Counts and (depending on the line) from 1778 (1790 or 1802) to Imperial Princes. The dynasty ruled divided areas in various lines and sub-lines; around 1700 there were ten Reussian counties of both main branches. The lords, counts and princes were never styled of Reuss, but rather count or prince Reuss, as Reuss was originally not the name of a town or castle, but rather a personal designation for the founder of the branch that indicated his foreign connection through marriage (Reussen is in fact an older German term for Russians), and the family is still referred to today in the plural as die Reussen.

On account of the close relations of Reuss with the neighbouring Saxon states, Lutheranism speedily gained a foothold in Reuss. The rulers joined the Schmalkaldic League against the German emperor, and forfeited their possessions, but afterwards recovered them.

=== Numbering of the Heinrichs ===
All the males of the House of Reuss are named Heinrich (Henry) plus a number. In the elder line, the numbers start again at one each time 100 is reached. In the younger line, the numbers reset at the beginning of each century.

This odd regulation was formulated as a Family Law in 1688, but the tradition of the uniformity of names goes back as far as 1200. It was seen as a way of honoring the Hohenstaufen Emperor Henry VI, who raised Heinrich der Reiche/Henry the Rich (d. 1209) to the office of provost of Quedlinburg Abbey and endowed him with the title vogt.

=== Main partition ===
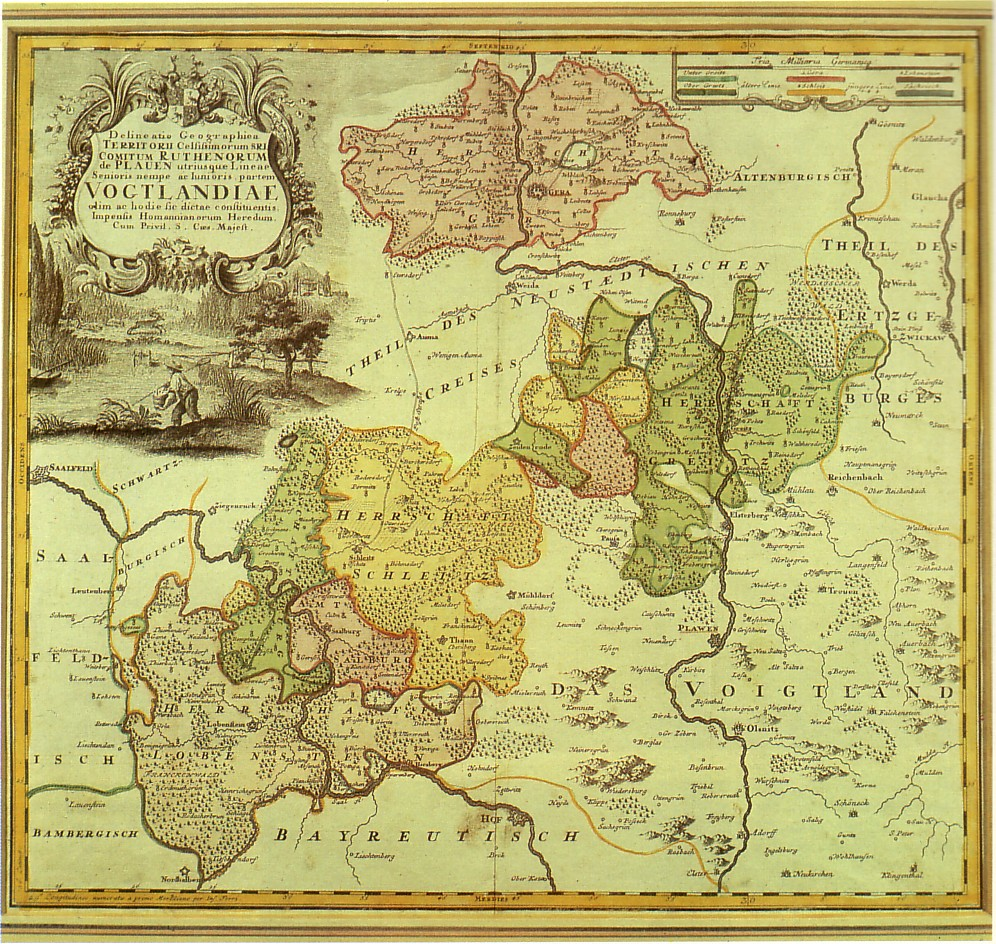
The Reuss territories in the 18th century: Green: Reuss elder line (Greiz, Burgk); Red: Reuss-Gera (with Saalburg); Yellow: Reuss-Schleiz; Brown: Reuss-Lobenstein

In 1564 the sons of Henry XIII of Reuss at Greiz divided the estates into

- Reuss at Lower Greiz, descendants of Henry XIV the Elder
- Reuss at Upper Greiz, descendants of Henry XV the Middle
- Reuss at Gera, descendants of Henry XVI the Younger.

While the Middle Reuss became extinct in 1616, the Older and Younger lines were divided again several times until in 1778 Count Henry XI united the possessions of Upper and Lower Greiz to the Principality of Reuss Elder Line. In return the remaining estates of Gera, considerably larger though, became the Principality of Reuss Younger Line in 1806. The two remaining Reuss principalities joined the German Confederation in 1815. Several subdivisions of the Younger Line merged into a unified state by 1848.

Henry XXII of Reuss Elder line is notable among the modern princes of this house for his enmity to Prussia, which he opposed in the Austro-Prussian War of 1866, when the Prussian troops occupied his domain. Henry joined the North German Confederation and the new German Empire in 1871. He alone of all the confederate princes remained until his death in 1902 an implacable adversary of the chancellor of Germany, Otto von Bismarck, and of the conditions created by the foundation of the new empire. Despite his views, his daughter Hermine Reuss of Greiz became the second wife of the exiled German Emperor and Prussian King Wilhelm II in 1922. Other daughters of the house also made important marriages: Countess Augusta Reuss of Ebersdorf, by marriage the Duchess of Saxe-Coburg-Saalfeld, was the maternal grandmother of the British Queen Victoria and the paternal grandmother of Victoria's husband, Albert, Prince Consort. Princess Augusta Reuss of Köstritz married the Grand Duke of Mecklenburg-Schwerin, Frederick Francis II, in 1849 and Eleonore Reuss of Köstritz became queen consort ("Tsaritsa") of Bulgaria in 1908 by marrying King Ferdinand I.

Heinrich XXIV, Prince Reuss of Greiz (1878–1927), was incapable of ruling and therefore the regency passed to the ruling prince of the younger line of Reuss. Since the childless Heinrich XXIV was the last of his line, it was to be expected that the principality of the elder line would fall to the younger line after his death, and that a united state of Reuss would emerge as a result. However, both lines lost their thrones in the German Revolution of 1918–19 and a united, albeit republican state, the People's State of Reuss, emerged in 1919, only to merge with the larger state of Thuringia in 1920. The unified state of Reuss had a non-contiguous area of 1,143 square kilometers and 211,324 inhabitants (1919). It still comprised about a third of the historical Vogtland, which had been ruled in the Middle Ages by the vogts (bailiffs), the ancestors of the Reuss family.

A (non-governing) side branch of the younger line had emerged in 1692 when Heinrich XXIV, Count Reuss of Köstritz, a younger son of the ruling count Heinrich I. Reuss of Schleiz, received a number of landed estates as a paréage within his eldest brother's county, with his main seat at Köstritz Castle. This branch connected through marriages with important ruling houses, did, however, not govern their own territory, but lived as landowners in the county of the Schleiz Line. Henry XLIII., count Reuss of Köstritz, was elevated to hereditary Fürst (prince) by Emperor Francis II in 1806 (however, without governmental power); the paréage of Köstritz remained within the principality of the younger line.

When the elder line died out with Heinrich XXIV in 1927 and the younger one when Heinrich XLV, son of the last ruler, died childless in 1945 as a prisoner of the communists, thus both main branches having become extinct, the dynastic succession (and the theoretical claims to their thrones) passed to the princely House Reuss of Köstritz. This side line of the Younger Line is therefore the only branch of the entire house that still exists today, but has over 30 male members, all named Heinrich. The family council decided on 5 June 1930 that all members of the remaining family should henceforth omit any line addition (Younger Line or Köstritz) from their names and call themselves Prince or Princess Reuss. This name (as well as the Heinrichs' count) was retained by a court order even in the Weimar republic. The current head of the family, Heinrich XIV, dynastic actually the Fürst (Prince) Reuss of Köstritz (b. 1952), is also styled The Fürst (Prince) Reuss, as Köstritz is no longer a side line but the only branch of the house. His main seat is Ernstbrunn Castle in Austria which his family had inherited in 1822, while Köstritz Castle was expropriated by communist East Germany in 1945 and demolished in the 1970s. In 1945, the Princes Reuss lost all of their extended possessions and castles in their ancestral homeland through expropriation. Heinrich XIV and some of his relatives regained some properties in the former Reuss states following German Reunification in 1990.

=== Aftermath ===
After World War I, the Reuss territories were unified in 1919 as the People's State of Reuss, which was incorporated into the new state of Thuringia in 1920.

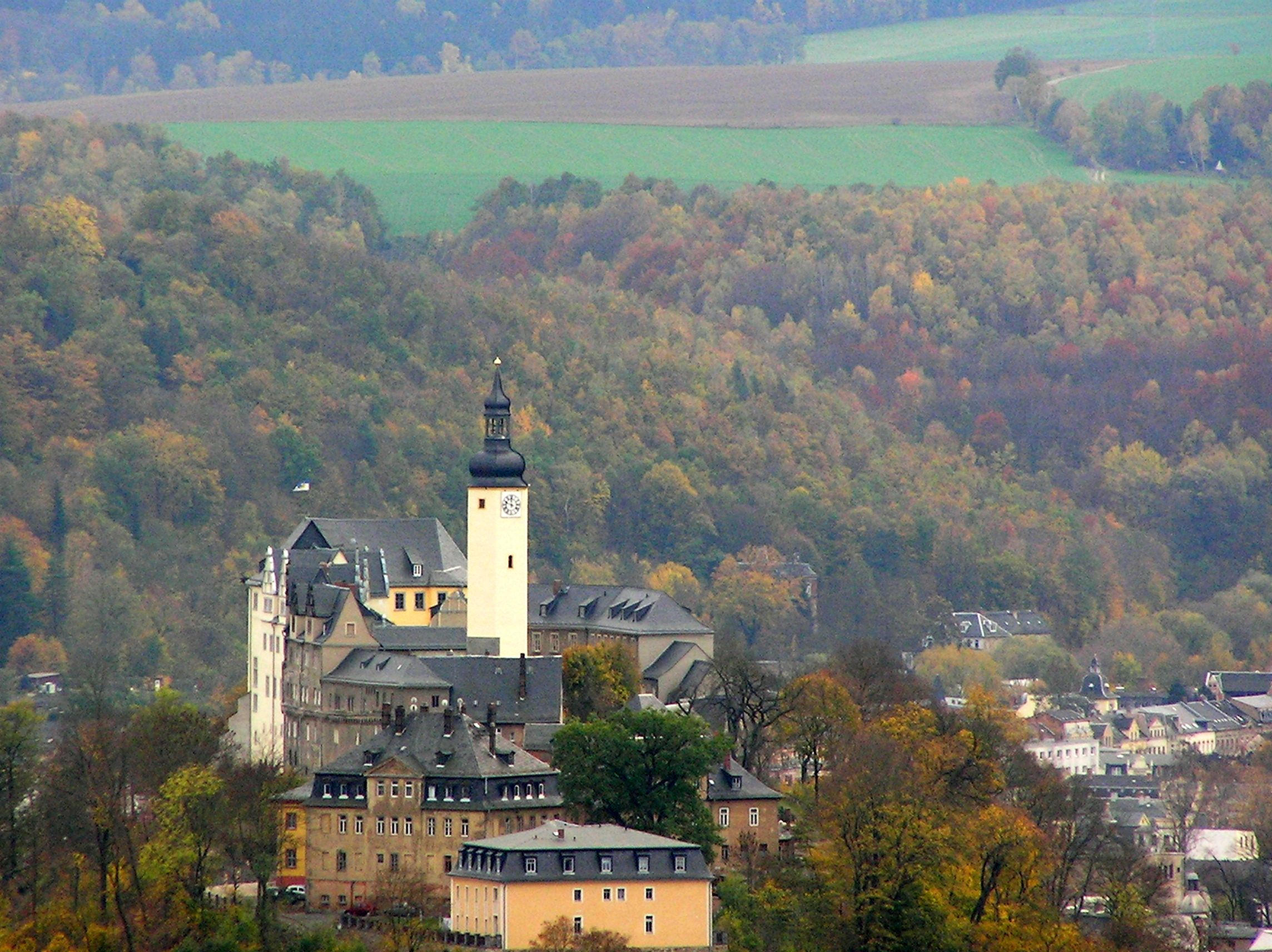
The Upper Castle at Greiz

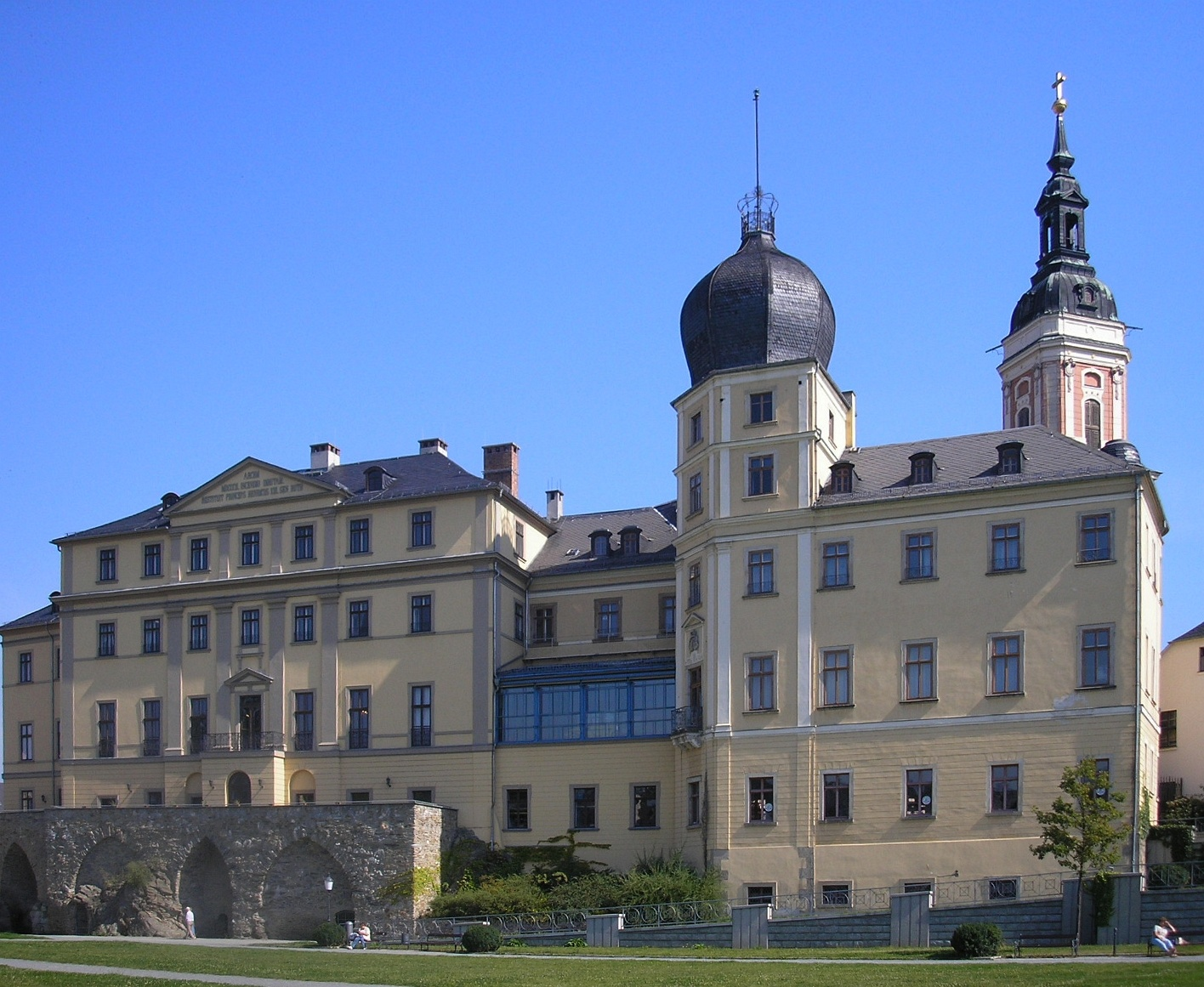
The Lower Castle at Greiz

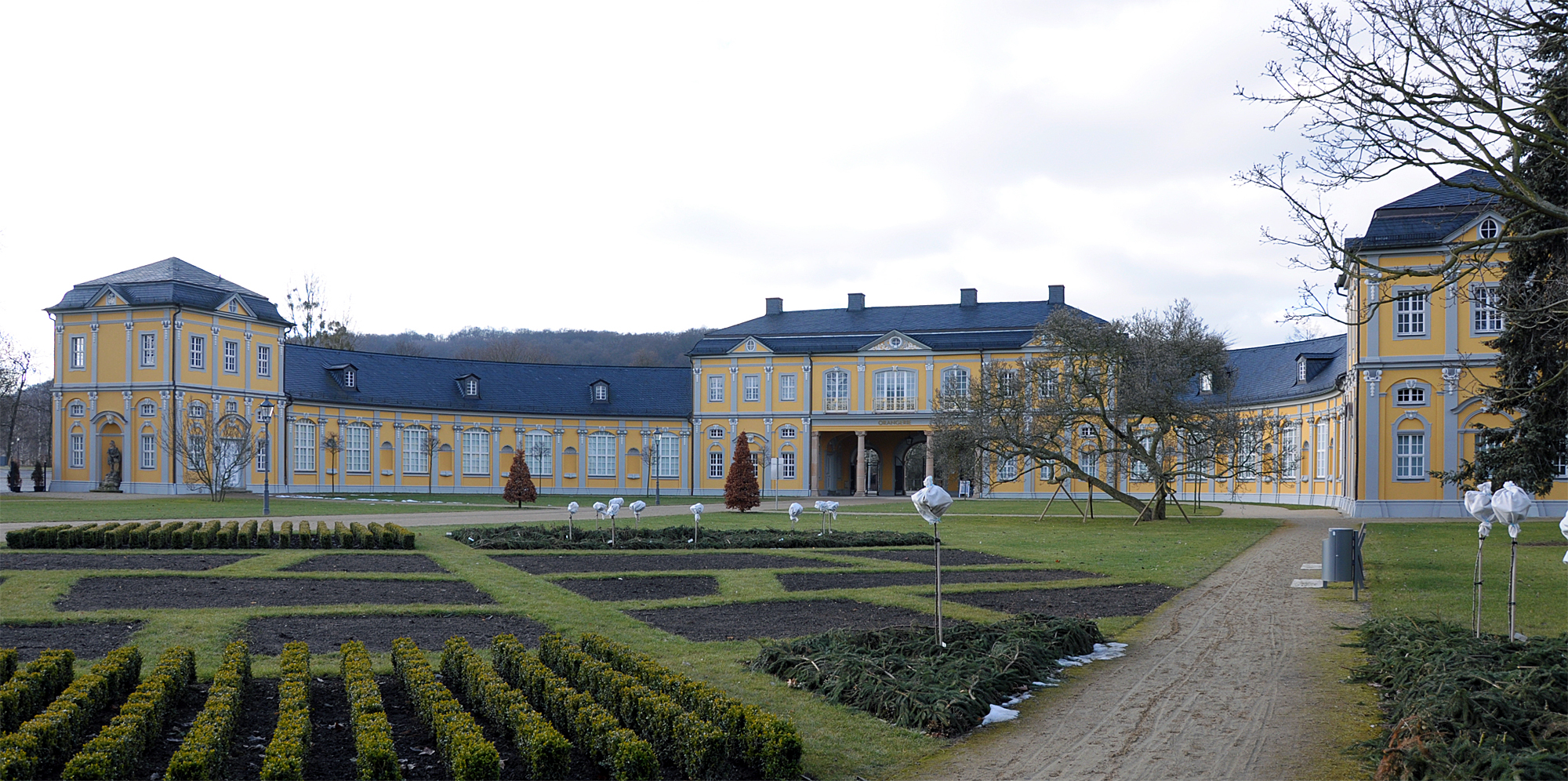
Orangery at Gera

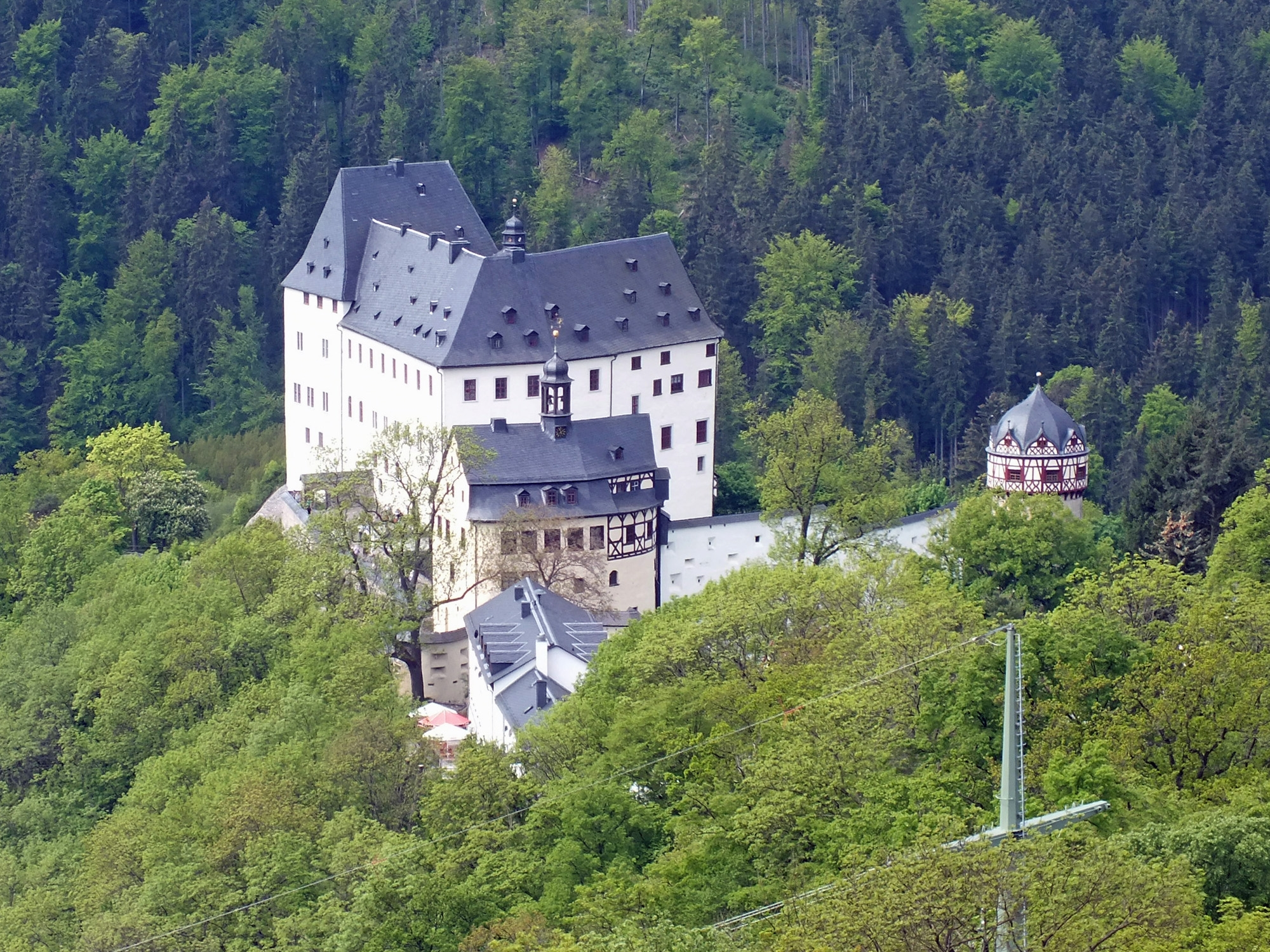
Burgk Castle

== Rulers of Reuss ==
=== House of Reuss ===
Partitions of Reuss under Reuss rule

Lordship of Weida (1122–1531)	Lordship of Plauen (1209–1572)	Lordship of Greiz (1st creation) (1209–1239)
Lordship of Greiz (2nd creation) (1274–1547)
Lordship of Lobenstein (1st creation) (1425–1489)	Lordship of Schleiz (1st creation) (1425–1547)	Lordship of Gera (1st creation) (1238–1502)
Lordship of Burgk (1578–1697)	Lordship of Gera (2nd creation) (1547–1673) Promoted to: County of Gera (1673–1802)	Lordship of Lobenstein (2nd creation) (1635–1673)	Lordship of Schleiz (2nd creation) (1635–1673)
Lordship of Greiz (1562–1673) Promoted to: County of Greiz (1673–1778) Middle Line II promoted to: Principality of Greiz (1778–1918)
Lordship of Ebersdorf (1671–1673) Promoted to: of Ebersdorf (1673–1806)	Promoted to: County of Lobenstein (1673–1806) Promoted to: Principality of Lobenstein (1806–1824)
Promoted to: County of Schleiz (1673–1848)	County of Kostritz (1692–1806) Promoted to: Principality of Kostritz (1806–1918)
Gera divided between the remnant Younger Line territories	Promoted to: Principality of Ebersdorf (1806–1848)
Principality of Gera (Reuss-Schleiz line) (1848–1918)

Table of rulers
Notes:
- The feudal table above was simplified: there were many other divisions which were omitted, but they will appear below, as short-lived separations from the more important ones.
- The consistent use of the name Henry is a tribute to Henry VI, Holy Roman Emperor. Every male member of the family has this name since the third generation of the family.
- The numbering of the rulers explained above, are as follows:
  - Prior to the annexation of Greiz and Gera to Plauen (1547–62), the numberings attributed are sequential. Please bear in mind that there are other sequences besides the one proposed.
  - After the liberation of Plauen control (1547–62), the Reuss states divided between Elder, Middle and Younger Lines. While the Middle Line followed the sequence pre-annexation (and was the first of the three to be extinct), the other two started a very odd sequence and tradition, as follows:
    - The Elder Line numbers every male member of the family (even the stillborn sons) in sequential order of birth until 100; the numbering restarts from there.
    - The Younger Line numbers every male member of the family (even the stillborn sons) in sequential order of birth until the end of the century; the numbering restarts from the first child born in the new century.

Ruler		Born	Reign	Ruling part	Consort	Death	Notes
Erkenbert I		c.1090 Son of ?	1122 – 1 August 1163	Lordship of Weida	Jordana of Gleissberg (c.1100-27 April 1167/73); 1120 three children	1 August 1163 aged 72–73	Founder of the family.
Erkenbert II		1124; Second son of Erkenbert I and Jordana of Gleissberg	1 August 1163 – c.1175	Lordship of Weida	Jutta of Saxony two children	c.1175 aged 50–51	Children of Erkenbert I. The elder two ruled jointly.
Henry I the Just		1122; First son of Erkenbert I and Jordana of Gleissberg	1 August 1163 – 1193	Lordship of Weida	Lukardis of Lautenberg (1126–1162); 1143/55 two children Juliane of Schwarzburg (1127-?); 1163 one child	1193 aged 70–71	Children of Erkenbert I. The elder two ruled jointly.
Otto		c.1125 Third son of Erkenbert I and Jordana of Gleissberg	1 August 1163 – 1171	Lordship of Weida (in Osterode)	Unmarried	1171 aged 46/7	Children of Erkenbert I. The elder two ruled jointly.
Henry II the Rich		1164; Son of Henry I and Juliane of Schwarzburg	1193 – 3 August 1209	Lordship of Weida	Bertha of Vohburg (c.1160-bef. 24 September 1209); 1187 five children	3 August 1209 aged 44–45	
Henry III the Elder		c.1180 First son of Henry II and Bertha of Vohburg	3 August 1209 – 1219	Lordship of Weida	Unknown three children	9 July 1224	Children of Henry II, divided the Reuss lands for the first time. Henry III abdicated to his own son to join the Teutonic Order.
Henry IV the Middle		1182; Second son of Henry II and Bertha of Vohburg	3 August 1209 – 1249	Lordship of Plauen	Jutta of Altenburg (1186-Aft. 1 May 1268); 1225 (annulled 8 September 1238) three children	1249 aged 66–67	Children of Henry II, divided the Reuss lands for the first time. Henry III abdicated to his own son to join the Teutonic Order.
Henry V the Younger		1184; Third son of Henry II and Bertha of Vohburg	3 August 1209 – 1239	Lordship of Greiz	Isengard of Waldenburg (d.13 March 12??) no children	1239 aged 54–55	Children of Henry II, divided the Reuss lands for the first time. Henry III abdicated to his own son to join the Teutonic Order.
Greiz annexed to Plauen
Regency (1219–1224)							
Henry VI the Peppersack		1210; Son of Henry III	1219 – 23 September 1258	Lordship of Weida	Heilika of Hardegg (1214-?); 1235 two children	23 September 1258 aged 47–48	
Henry I		1226; First son of Henry IV and Jutta of Altenburg	1249–1303	Lordship of Plauen	Adelaide of Lobdeburg-Lichtenburg (1228–1253); 1247; Leuchtenburg two children ? of Everstein (1230-bef.1253); 1250 no children Kunigunde of Lützelstein (1234-Bef.23 April 1302); 1253; Lützelstein five children	1303 aged 76–77	Henry of Plauen and Henry of Gera were sons of Henry IV. Henry I of Plauen associated his eldest son (Henry the Bohemian) to the government, and gave Greiz to his second son, Henry the Russian. The lord of Greiz's surname, the Russian is said to have originated the family's surname, Reuss.
Henry II the Bohemian		1254; First son of Henry I and Adelaide of Lobdeburg-Lichtenburg	1274–1302	Lordship of Plauen	Catherine of Riesenburg; Duchcov three children	1302 aged 47–48	Henry of Plauen and Henry of Gera were sons of Henry IV. Henry I of Plauen associated his eldest son (Henry the Bohemian) to the government, and gave Greiz to his second son, Henry the Russian. The lord of Greiz's surname, the Russian is said to have originated the family's surname, Reuss.
Henry I the Russian		1256; Second son of Henry I and Adelaide of Lobdeburg-Lichtenburg	1274 – 12 December 1295	Lordship of Greiz	Jutta of Schwarzburg-Blankenburg (1277-Aft.10 May 1329); 30 March 1289 three children	12 December 1295 aged 38–39	Henry of Plauen and Henry of Gera were sons of Henry IV. Henry I of Plauen associated his eldest son (Henry the Bohemian) to the government, and gave Greiz to his second son, Henry the Russian. The lord of Greiz's surname, the Russian is said to have originated the family's surname, Reuss.
Henry I the Younger		1227; Second son of Henry IV and Jutta of Altenburg	1249 – 1 June 1274	Lordship of Gera	Luitgard-Irmgard of Helmerungen (1231-Aft.31 August 1279) eight children	1 June 1274 aged 46–47	Henry of Plauen and Henry of Gera were sons of Henry IV. Henry I of Plauen associated his eldest son (Henry the Bohemian) to the government, and gave Greiz to his second son, Henry the Russian. The lord of Greiz's surname, the Russian is said to have originated the family's surname, Reuss.
Henry VII the Red		1236; First son of Henry VI and Heilika of Hardegg	23 September 1258 – 1260	Lordship of Weida	Unmarried	1260 aged 23–24	Children of Henry VI, ruled jointly.
Henry VIII of Orlamünde		1238; Second son of Henry VI and Heilika of Hardegg	23 September 1258 – 17 September 1280	Lordship of Weida	Irmgard of Dewin (c.1240-?); 1248 two children Sophie of Weimar-Orlamünde; 19 July 1258 three children	17 September 1280 aged 41–42	Children of Henry VI, ruled jointly.
Henry II the Elder		1254; First son of Henry I and Luitgard-Irmgard of Helmerungen	1 June 1274 – 1310	Lordship of Gera	Irmgard of Weimar-Orlamünde (1264–1318); 27 March 1276 eight children	c.1310 aged 55–56	Children of Henry I, ruled jointly.
Henry III the Younger		1256; Second son of Henry I and Luitgard-Irmgard of Helmerungen	1 June 1274 – 3 August 1311	Lordship of Gera	Unknown three children	3 August 1311 aged 54–55	Children of Henry I, ruled jointly.
Henry IX the Elder		1260; First son of Henry VIII and Sophie of Weimar-Orlamünde	17 September 1280 – 1320	Lordship of Weida	? of Lobdeburg eight children	1320 aged 59–60	Children of Henry VIII, ruled jointly.
Henry X the Younger		1264; Second son of Henry VIII and Sophie of Weimar-Orlamünde	17 September 1280 – 1293	Lordship of Weida	Hedwig two children	1293 aged 28–29	Children of Henry VIII, ruled jointly.
Regency of Jutta of Schwarzburg-Blankenburg (1295–1306)							
Henry II		1289; Son of Henry I and Jutta of Schwarzburg-Blankenburg	12 December 1295 – 18 December 1350	Lordship of Greiz	Sophie of Beichlingen (1288–1335); 1306 two children Salomea of Żagań (1319-Aft.12 June 1359); 1335 ten children	18 December 1350 aged 60–61	
Henry III the Tall		1284; Son of Henry II and Catherine of Riesenburg	1303–1348	Lordship of Plauen	Margaret of Seberg (1288-bef.20 February 1322); Bef. 1302 six children	1348 aged 63–64	Father and son. Henry IV received from his father the lordship of Mühltroff. They either died in the same year, or Henry IV predeceased his father.
Henry IV the Younger		1308; Son of Henry III and Margaret of Seberg	1317–1348	Lordship of Plauen (at Mühltroff)	Agnes of Schlüsselberg (1312–17 August 1354) two children	1348 aged 39–40	Father and son. Henry IV received from his father the lordship of Mühltroff. They either died in the same year, or Henry IV predeceased his father.
Regency of Irmgard of Weimar-Orlamünde (1311–1314)							Had no heirs, and was succeeded by his brother Henry V.
Henry IV the Elder		1305; First son of Henry II and Irmgard of Weimar-Orlamünde	1310 – 14 September 1343	Lordship of Gera	Sophia Schenk of Dornburg (d. Aft. 1331); 24 June 1324 no children	14 September 1343 aged 37–38	Had no heirs, and was succeeded by his brother Henry V.
Henry XI the Elder		1289; Son of Henry IX and ? of Lobdeburg	1320–1366	Lordship of Weida	Catherine Reuss of Plauen (1310-Bef.1 March 1336); Bef.16 September 1323 four children	1366 aged 76–77	Cousins, ruled jointly. Henry XII abdicated in 1324.
Henry XII the Younger		1288; Son of Henry X and Hedwig	1320–1324	Lordship of Weida	Unknown two children	c.1350 aged c.61-62	Cousins, ruled jointly. Henry XII abdicated in 1324.
Henry V the Elder		1322; First son of Henry IV and Agnes of Schlüsselberg	1348–1357	Lordship of Plauen (at Mühltroff)	Irmgard of Orlamünde (1326-Aft.5 May 1388); 1345 five children	1364 aged 41–42	Children of Henry IV, divided their inheritance: Henry V inherited the property of his father at Mühltroff, and Henry VI received the main lands of his grandfather in Plauen. In 1357 Henry V abdicated to his son, Henry VII.
Henry VI the Younger		1324; Second son of Henry IV and Agnes of Schlüsselberg	1348–1370	Lordship of Plauen	Luitgard of Kranichfeld (1334-Aft.30 March 1376); 1353 three children	c.1370 aged 45–46	Children of Henry IV, divided their inheritance: Henry V inherited the property of his father at Mühltroff, and Henry VI received the main lands of his grandfather in Plauen. In 1357 Henry V abdicated to his son, Henry VII.
Henry V		1308; Second son of Henry II and Irmgard of Weimar-Orlamünde	14 September 1343 – 8 December 1377	Lordship of Gera	Matilda of Schwarzburg-Käfernburg (1313–1375/76); Bef. 20 July 1328 seven children	8 December 1377 aged 68–69	Henry V associated his eldest son, Henry VI, to the co-rulership, but he predeceased him.
Henry VI		1322; Gera; First son of Henry V and Matilda of Schwarzburg-Käfernburg	14 September 1343 – 1350	Lordship of Gera	Jutta Reuss of Plauen (1331-Aft. 1344); 1344 no children	c.1350 aged c.27-28?	Henry V associated his eldest son, Henry VI, to the co-rulership, but he predeceased him.
Henry III the Elder		1333; Plauen; First son of Henry II and Salomea of Żagań	18 December 1350 – 1368	Lordship of Greiz	Jutta of Hackeborn (1343-?) three children Agnes of Leisnig-Penig (d.Aft.6 December 1359); Bf. 4 March 1355 three children	1368 aged 34–35	Children of Henry II. Henry IV and Henry V, the younger brothers, co-ruled at Ronneburg. After their deaths, Ronneburg was reabsorbed by Greiz.
Henry IV the Middle		1335; Plauen; Second son of Henry II and Salomea of Żagań	18 December 1350 – 1370	Lordship of Greiz (at Ronneburg)	Unmarried	1370 aged 34–35	Children of Henry II. Henry IV and Henry V, the younger brothers, co-ruled at Ronneburg. After their deaths, Ronneburg was reabsorbed by Greiz.
Henry V the Younger		1337; Plauen; Third son of Henry II and Salomea of Żagań	18 December 1350 – 1398	Lordship of Greiz (at Ronneburg)	Dorothea Reuss of Gera (1377-Bef.12 February 1410); Bef.20 December 1387 no children Sophie Reuss of Gera (1339-Bef.12 February 1411) no children	1398 aged 60–61	Children of Henry II. Henry IV and Henry V, the younger brothers, co-ruled at Ronneburg. After their deaths, Ronneburg was reabsorbed by Greiz.
Ronneburg annexed to Greiz
Regency of Irmgard of Orlamünde (1357–1364)							Inherited his father's part of the inheritance in Mühltroff, but, despite having heirs, Mühltroff was recovered by Plauen after his death. Henry of Plauen I, Grand Master of the Teutonic Order, was his son.
Henry VII		1348; Son of Henry V and Irmgard of Orlamünde	1357–1380	Lordship of Plauen (at Mühltroff)	? Reuss of Weida (Aft.1346–1363/66); Bef.28 Jul 1362 three children	1380 aged 31–32	Inherited his father's part of the inheritance in Mühltroff, but, despite having heirs, Mühltroff was recovered by Plauen after his death. Henry of Plauen I, Grand Master of the Teutonic Order, was his son.
Mühltroff annexed to Plauen
Henry XIII the Knight		1338; First son of Henry XI and Catherine Reuss of Plauen	1366 – 1 June 1373	Lordship of Weida	Elsa Reuss of Gera (1335-Aft.3 June 1371) no children	1 June 1373 aged 34–35	Sons of Henry XI, ruled jointly, after a period of co-rulership with their father (since 1351).
Henry XIV the Red		1342; Second son of Henry XI and Catherine Reuss of Plauen	1366 – 13 March 1389	Lordship of Weida	Margaret of Uttenhofen (1346-Bef.7 September 1376) two children	13 March 1389 aged 46–47	Sons of Henry XI, ruled jointly, after a period of co-rulership with their father (since 1351).
Henry VI the Elder		1355; First son of Henry III and Jutta of Hackeborn	1368–1445	Lordship of Greiz (at Inner Greiz)	Gaudentia of Lobdeburg-Elsterburg (1359-Aft. 28 November 1395); Aft.14 February 1375 three children	c.1445 aged 89–90	Children of Henry III, Henry VI and Henry VII divided Greiz: Henry VI took Inner Greiz (Hintergreiz), and Henry VII took Outer Greiz (Vordergreiz). Henry VI associated his son, Henry VIII, to his rule, but he predeceased him.
Henry VIII		1382; Son of Henry VI and Gaudentia of Lobdeburg-Elsterburg	1398–1436	Lordship of Greiz (at Inner Greiz)	Unmarried	1436 aged 53–54	Children of Henry III, Henry VI and Henry VII divided Greiz: Henry VI took Inner Greiz (Hintergreiz), and Henry VII took Outer Greiz (Vordergreiz). Henry VI associated his son, Henry VIII, to his rule, but he predeceased him.
Henry VII the Younger		c.1360 Second son of Henry III and Jutta of Hackeborn	1368 – 16 June 1426	Lordship of Greiz (at Outer Greiz)	Matilda of Schönburg-Crimmitschau (1380-?); Bef. 14 March 1398 two children Irmgard of Kirchberg-Kranichfeld (d.aft.18 June 1462); Bef.3 June 1414 five children	16 June 1426; Ústí nad Labem aged 65–66	Children of Henry III, Henry VI and Henry VII divided Greiz: Henry VI took Inner Greiz (Hintergreiz), and Henry VII took Outer Greiz (Vordergreiz). Henry VI associated his son, Henry VIII, to his rule, but he predeceased him.
Inner Greiz annexed to Outer Greiz
Regency of Luitgard of Kranichfeld (1370–1387)							Also Lord of Königswart. In 1357 absorbed Mühltroff.
Henry VIII the Younger		1362; Son of Henry VI and Luitgard of Kranichfeld	1370–1413	Lordship of Plauen	Anna of Riesenburg (1366-Aft.1411); 1383/86 two children	1413 aged 50–51	Also Lord of Königswart. In 1357 absorbed Mühltroff.
Henry VII		3 May 1341; First son of Henry V and Matilda of Schwarzburg-Käfernburg	8 December 1377 – 1420	Lordship of Gera	Elisabeth of Schwarzburg-Blankenburg (1341–1399/1401); 4 December 1367 two children Lutrud of Hohnstein-Heringen (1372-24 April 1446); 23 October 1401; Eltville six children	1420 aged 78–79	Brother of Henry VI, succeeded his father.
Henry XV		1366; Son of Henry XIV and Margaret of Uttenhofen	13 March 1389 – 1404	Lordship of Weida	Anna (d.c.1415) four children	1404 aged 37–38	Son of Henry XIV, co-ruled with his father since his uncle's death in 1373.
Henry XVI the Elder		1390; First son of Henry XV and Anna	1404–1454	Lordship of Weida	Anna (1396-Aft.14 April 1442); Bef.1415 no children	1454 aged 63–64	Children of Henry XV, ruled jointly.
Henry XVII the Middle		c.1395 Second son of Henry XV and Anna	1404–1426	Lordship of Weida	Anna of Dahme (1396-3 October 1414); 1405/06 no children	1426 aged 30–31	Children of Henry XV, ruled jointly.
Henry XVIII the Younger		1396; Third son of Henry XV and Anna	1404 – 27 June 1462	Lordship of Weida	Elisabeth of Dahme (1410-?) four children	27 June 1462 aged 65–66	Children of Henry XV, ruled jointly.
Henry I		c.1380 Son of Henry VIII and Anna of Riesenburg	1413 – 28 December 1446	Lordship of Plauen (with Burgraviate of Meissen)	Margaret of Dahme (1390-Aft.2 September 1412); Bef.3 July 1410 four children Katharina of Sternberg (1400-?) no children Anna Holitz of Sternberg (1413-?); 8 January 1441 no children	28 December 1446; Eger aged 65–66	Received the title of Burgrave of Meissen, which motivated a new restart on the Plauen line numbering of rulers.
Henry VIII the Elder		2 March 1404; First son of Henry VII and Lutrud of Hohnstein-Heringen	1420–1426	Lordship of Gera (at Burgk from 1425)	Margaret of Wertheim (d. Bef. 23 October 1424); 30 August 1412; Kronach no children Williburg of Schwarzburg-Leutenberg (d. Aft. 1426); Bef.2 May 1426 no children	16 June 1426; Ústí nad Labem aged 22	Children of Henry VII, ruled jointly until 1425, dividing then the land, but it was quickly reunited under Henry IX. His sons would officially divide the land.
Henry IX the Middle		14 January 1406; Second son of Henry VII and Lutrud of Hohnstein-Heringen	1420–1452	Lordship of Lobenstein	Matilda of Schwarzburg-Wachsenburg (1409-Aft.4 August 1456); 1435/39 eight children	1482 aged 75–76	Children of Henry VII, ruled jointly until 1425, dividing then the land, but it was quickly reunited under Henry IX. His sons would officially divide the land.
Henry IX the Middle		14 January 1406; Second son of Henry VII and Lutrud of Hohnstein-Heringen	1452–1482	Lordship of Gera	Matilda of Schwarzburg-Wachsenburg (1409-Aft.4 August 1456); 1435/39 eight children	1482 aged 75–76	Children of Henry VII, ruled jointly until 1425, dividing then the land, but it was quickly reunited under Henry IX. His sons would officially divide the land.
Henry X the Younger		11 October 1415; Third son of Henry VII and Lutrud of Hohnstein-Heringen	1420–1452	Lordship of Schleiz	Anna of Henneberg-Römhild (1424-Aft.16 November 1467); 1439/40 five children	1452; Prague aged 36–37	Children of Henry VII, ruled jointly until 1425, dividing then the land, but it was quickly reunited under Henry IX. His sons would officially divide the land.
Lobenstein and Schleiz briefly annexed to Gera
Henry IX the Elder		1410; Son of Henry VII and Matilda of Schönburg-Crimmitschau	1455–1476	Lordship of Greiz	Magdalena of Schwarzenberg (1277-Aft.10 May 1329); 1443 ten children	1476 aged 65–66	Children of Henry VII, ruled jointly.
Henry X the Younger		1424; Son of Henry VII and Irmgard of Kirchberg-Kranichfeld	1455 – 17 March 1462	Lordship of Greiz (at Kranichfeld)	Unmarried	17 March 1462 aged 37–38	Children of Henry VII, ruled jointly.
Kranichfeld reabsorbed into Greiz
Henry II		1417; Son of Henry I and Margaret of Dahme	28 December 1446 – 1484	Lordship of Plauen (with Burgraviate of Meissen)	Anna-Agnes of Anhalt-Zerbst (1433-8 April 1492); 1456/61 (annulled bef.1467) no children Anna of Bünau (1430-Aft.1480) seven children	1484 aged 66–67	Children of Henry I, divided their inheritance. In 1466, part of lordship of Plauen (the part over the Ämter of Plauen and Voigtsberg), was given to the Saxon elector, Ernest as a Bohemian enfeoffment. However, Henry II still retained a part of Plauen.
Margaret		1419; Daughter of Henry I and Margaret of Dahme	28 December 1446 – 1466	Lordship of Plauen (in Königswart)	Heinrich Kruschina of Schwamberg (d.1479) c.1435 no children	1466 aged 46–47	Children of Henry I, divided their inheritance. In 1466, part of lordship of Plauen (the part over the Ämter of Plauen and Voigtsberg), was given to the Saxon elector, Ernest as a Bohemian enfeoffment. However, Henry II still retained a part of Plauen.
Königswart inherited by the Schwamberg family
Henry XIX		c.1440? Son of Henry XVIII and Elisabeth of Dahme	27 June 1462 – 1512	Lordship of Weida	Agnes Schenk of Landsberg (d.1512) five children	1512 aged 71–72?	From 1480, Henry XIX associated his sons in a co-rulership.
Henry XX the Elder		1466; First son of Henry XIX and Agnes Schenk of Landsberg	1480 – 2 May 1507	Lordship of Weida	Unmarried	2 May 1507 aged 40–41	From 1480, Henry XIX associated his sons in a co-rulership.
Henry XXI the Middle		1468; Second son of Henry XIX and Agnes Schenk of Landsberg	1480–1510	Lordship of Weida	Unmarried	1510 aged 41–42	From 1480, Henry XIX associated his sons in a co-rulership.
Henry XI the Elder		1455; First son of Henry IX and Magdalena of Schwarzenberg	1476–1502	Lordship of Greiz	Catherine of Gera (1475-Aft.23 May 1505); 2 July 1496 two children	1502 aged 46–47	Children of Henry IX, ruled jointly. Henry XIII dropped the co-rulership in 1485, but returned to rule alone in 1529, after the death of Henry XI and abdication of Henry XII.
Henry XII the Middle		1459; Second son of Henry IX and Magdalena of Schwarzenberg	1476–1529	Lordship of Greiz (at Kranichfeld until 1502)	Catherine of Gleichen-Remda (d. Aft.1509); 5 February 1488 two children	1539 aged 79–80	Children of Henry IX, ruled jointly. Henry XIII dropped the co-rulership in 1485, but returned to rule alone in 1529, after the death of Henry XI and abdication of Henry XII.
Henry XIII the Silent		1464; Third son of Henry IX and Magdalena of Schwarzenberg	1476–1485 1529 – 8 June 1535	Lordship of Greiz	Anna Dorothea of Colditz (1484-?); Bef.14 February 1506 two children Amalia of Outer Mansfeld (1506-Aft.1557) seven children	8 June 1535; Greiz aged 70–71	Children of Henry IX, ruled jointly. Henry XIII dropped the co-rulership in 1485, but returned to rule alone in 1529, after the death of Henry XI and abdication of Henry XII.
Kranichfeld reabsorbed in Greiz
Henry XI the Elder		1436; First son of Henry IX and Matilda of Schwarzburg-Wachsenburg	1482–1502	Lordship of Gera	Unmarried	25 September 1508; Gera aged 71–72	Children of Henry IX, divided the land. However, Henry XIII died soon after and Henry XII acquired his land. Henry XI would sell his part to his nephews Henry XIV and Henry XV in 1502.
Henry XII the Middle		1438; Second son of Henry IX and Matilda of Schwarzburg-Wachsenburg	1482 – 26 August 1500	Lordship of Schleiz	Hedwig of Mansfeld-Rammelburg five children	26 August 1500 aged 61–62	Children of Henry IX, divided the land. However, Henry XIII died soon after and Henry XII acquired his land. Henry XI would sell his part to his nephews Henry XIV and Henry XV in 1502.
Henry XIII the Younger		1439; Third son of Henry IX and Matilda of Schwarzburg-Wachsenburg	1482 – 1489	Lordship of Lobenstein	Unmarried	1489 aged 49–50	Children of Henry IX, divided the land. However, Henry XIII died soon after and Henry XII acquired his land. Henry XI would sell his part to his nephews Henry XIV and Henry XV in 1502.
Gera and Lobenstein annexed to Schleiz
Henry III		1453; Son of Henry II and Anna of Bünau	1484 – 28 August 1519	Lordship of Plauen (with Burgraviate of Meissen in 1484)	Matilda of Schwarzburg-Leutenberg (1457–1492); 18 February 1478; Königswart two children Barbara of Anhalt-Köthen (1485–1532/33); 25 November 1503; Waldmünchen three children	28 August 1519 aged 34–35	Finally renounced his claims in favour of the House of Wettin, but still retained the right for himself and his descendants to bear the title of Burgrave of Meissen, which conferred on him a voice at the Imperial Diet. This was confirmed to him by Emperor Frederick III in a 1490 document.
Henry XIV the Elder		1471; First son of Henry XII and Hedwig of Mansfeld-Rammelburg	26 August 1500 – 12 April 1538	Lordship of Schleiz	Magdalena of Minitz-Lischkow (1469/74–1510/15); Bef. 19 September 1502 three children Anna of Beichlingen (d. 30 July 1571); 1515 no children	12 April 1538; Bad Lobenstein aged 66–67	Children of Henry XII, ruled jointly. They bought Gera from his uncle in 1502, but lost it in 1547 to Plauen. Both left no heirs, and their remaining domains were also absorbed by Plauen.
Henry XV the Younger		1476; Second son of Henry XII and Hedwig of Mansfeld-Rammelburg	26 August 1500 – 17 August 1550	Lordship of Schleiz	Ludmilla of Lobkowicz-Hassenstein (d.1532); 24 October 1510 no children Margaret (d.Bef. 11 September 1549) no children Margaret of Schwarzburg-Leutenberg (1530–18 March 1559); 6 May 1550 no children	17 August 1550; Burgk aged 73–74	Children of Henry XII, ruled jointly. They bought Gera from his uncle in 1502, but lost it in 1547 to Plauen. Both left no heirs, and their remaining domains were also absorbed by Plauen.
Schleiz annexed to Plauen (1550–1562)
Henry XXII the Younger		1470; Third son of Henry XIX and Agnes Schenk of Landsberg	1512 – 5 March 1531	Lordship of Weida	Margaret, Countess of Mansfeld-Aseleben (1458-20 February 1531) bef.1493 one child	5 March 1531; Wildenfels aged 60–61	Co-ruled with his father and brothers since 1480.
Weida (with exceptions) annexed to Plauen
Regencies of Barbara of Anhalt-Köthen (1519-21) and Zdenko Leo Rosenthal, High Burgrave of Bohemia (1521-24)							
Henry IV		24 August 1510; Burg Hartenštejn; Son of Henry III and Barbara of Anhalt-Köthen	28 August 1519 – 19 May 1554	Lordship of Plauen	Margaret of Salm-Neuburg (1517–19 March 1573); 29 August 1532 two children	19 May 1554; Stadtsteinach aged 43	
Margaret		c.1500 Daughter of Henry XXII and Margaret, Countess of Mansfeld-Aseleben	5 March 1531 – 1569	Lordship of Weida (at Wildenfels)	John Henry, Count of Schwarzburg-Leutenberg; 13 January 1527 nine children	1569 aged 60–61	Inherited Wildenfels from her father, which passed through her inheritance to the House of Schwarzburg.
Wildenfels annexed to Schwarzburg-Leutenberg
Henry XIV / I the Elder		1506; Son of Henry XIII and Anna Dorothea of Colditz	8 June 1535 – 1547 1562 – 22 March 1572	Lordship of Greiz Lordship of Lower Greiz (Elder Line)	Barbara of Matsch (1507-April 1580); 10 June 1524 eleven children	22 March 1572; Greiz aged 65–66	Children of Henry XIII, ruled jointly. After recovering the Reuss territories from their cousins from Plauen (who would eventually annex in 1572), the brothers divided the land. Henry XIV became the progenitor of the Reuss Elder Line, Henry XV the forefather the Reuss Middle Line and Henry XVI as founder of the Reuss Younger Line. The Elder and Younger Lines restarted their numberings.
Henry XV the Middle		8 November 1525; Plauen; First son of Henry XIII and Amalia of Outer Mansfeld	8 June 1535 – 1547 1562 – 22 June 1578	Lordship of Greiz Lordship of Upper Greiz (Middle Line I)	Maria Salomea of Oettingen-Oettingen; 27 October 1560; Weimar four children	22 June 1578; Greiz aged 52	Children of Henry XIII, ruled jointly. After recovering the Reuss territories from their cousins from Plauen (who would eventually annex in 1572), the brothers divided the land. Henry XIV became the progenitor of the Reuss Elder Line, Henry XV the forefather the Reuss Middle Line and Henry XVI as founder of the Reuss Younger Line. The Elder and Younger Lines restarted their numberings.
Henry XVI / I the Younger		29 November 1530; Second son of Henry XIII and Amalia of Outer Mansfeld	8 June 1535 – 1547	Lordship of Greiz	Elisabeth Brigitte of Schwarzburg-Leutenberg (1534-23 June 1564); 1556 three children Dorothea of Solms-Laubach; 6 January 1566; Zeitz three children	6 April 1572; Schleiz aged 41	Children of Henry XIII, ruled jointly. After recovering the Reuss territories from their cousins from Plauen (who would eventually annex in 1572), the brothers divided the land. Henry XIV became the progenitor of the Reuss Elder Line, Henry XV the forefather the Reuss Middle Line and Henry XVI as founder of the Reuss Younger Line. The Elder and Younger Lines restarted their numberings.
Henry XVI / I the Younger		29 November 1530; Second son of Henry XIII and Amalia of Outer Mansfeld	1562 – 6 April 1572	Lordship of Gera (Younger Line)	Elisabeth Brigitte of Schwarzburg-Leutenberg (1534-23 June 1564); 1556 three children Dorothea of Solms-Laubach; 6 January 1566; Zeitz three children	6 April 1572; Schleiz aged 41	Children of Henry XIII, ruled jointly. After recovering the Reuss territories from their cousins from Plauen (who would eventually annex in 1572), the brothers divided the land. Henry XIV became the progenitor of the Reuss Elder Line, Henry XV the forefather the Reuss Middle Line and Henry XVI as founder of the Reuss Younger Line. The Elder and Younger Lines restarted their numberings.
Greiz annexed to Plauen (1547–1562)
Henry V the Elder		9 October 1533; Andělská Hora; First son of Henry IV and Margaret of Salm-Neuburg	19 May 1554 – 24 December 1568	Lordship of Plauen	Dorothea Catherine of Brandenburg-Ansbach; 2 February 1556; Gera or Ansbach four children	24 December 1568; Hof aged 35	Children of Henry IV, ruled jointly. After Henry VI's death, the Plauen line went extinct, as the children of Henry V died all in infancy. The land of Plauen was annexed to Greiz.
Henry VI the Younger		29 December 1536; Meissen; Second son of Henry IV and Margaret of Salm-Neuburg	19 May 1554 – 22 January 1572	Lordship of Plauen	Catherine of Brunswick-Gifhorn; 9 April 1564; Fallersleben no children Anna of Pomerania-Stettin; 27 August 1566; Stettin no children	22 January 1572; Schleiz aged 36	Children of Henry IV, ruled jointly. After Henry VI's death, the Plauen line went extinct, as the children of Henry V died all in infancy. The land of Plauen was annexed to Greiz.
Plauen (with exceptions) annexed to Greiz
Anna of Pomerania-Stettin		5 February 1531; Stettin; Daughter of Barnim IX, Duke of Pomerania-Stettin and Anna of Brunswick-Lüneburg	22 January 1572 – 1590	Lordship of Plauen (at Schleiz, Saalburg and Burgk)	Karl I, Prince of Anhalt-Zerbst; 16 May 1557; Zerbst no children Henry VI; 27 August 1566; Stettin no children Jobst III, Count of Barby-Mühlingen (8 May 1544 - 9 August 1609); 23 September 1576; Schleiz no children	13 October 1592; Groß Rosenburg aged 61	Widow of Henry VI, got involved in a conflict with her husband's family concerning her widow lands. The dispute lasted until 1590, when she finally agreed in returning the properties, in exchange of a sum of 42 250 guilders.
Schleiz, Saalburg and Burgk redivided between Reuss lines
From this point on, numerals are no longer sequential (if we exclude the Middle Line I, the first to be extinct). Remember the numberings once more: The Elder Line numbers every male member of the family (even the stillborn sons) in sequential order of birth until 100; the numbering restarts from there.; The Younger Line numbers every male member of the family (even the stillborn sons) in sequential order of birth until the end of the century; the numbering restarts from the first child born in the new century.; Given these implications, a male ruler that succeeds his father and wasn't the first son skips numerals; that's why numerals are not sequential from this point on.
Henry II the Tall		12 December 1543; Second son of Henry XIV / I and Barbara of Matsch	22 March 1572 – 1596	Lordship of Lower Greiz (Elder Line)	Judith of Oettingen-Oettingen (3 October 1544 – 4 November 1600); 21 September 1573; Oettingen eight children Anna of Middle Mansfeld (1563-21 December 1636); 7 November 1601; Burgk no children	24 May 1608; Burgk aged 64	Children of Henry XIV/I, divided the land. The younger two ruled jointly.
Henry II the Tall		12 December 1543; Second son of Henry XIV / I and Barbara of Matsch	1596 – 24 May 1608	Lordship of Burgk	Judith of Oettingen-Oettingen (3 October 1544 – 4 November 1600); 21 September 1573; Oettingen eight children Anna of Middle Mansfeld (1563-21 December 1636); 7 November 1601; Burgk no children	24 May 1608; Burgk aged 64	Children of Henry XIV/I, divided the land. The younger two ruled jointly.
Henry III		1546; Third son of Henry XIV / I and Barbara of Matsch	22 March 1572 – 1582	Lordship of Lower Greiz (Elder Line), (at Kranichfeld and Bad Lobenstein)	Unmarried	1582 aged 35–36	Children of Henry XIV/I, divided the land. The younger two ruled jointly.
Henry V		4 November 1549; Zwickau; Fifth son of Henry XIV / I and Barbara of Matsch	22 March 1572 – 9 October 1604	Lordship of Lower Greiz (Elder Line)	Maria of Schönburg-Waldenburg (29 August 1565 – 9 March 1628); 25 November 1583; Waldenburg eleven children	9 October 1604; Greiz aged 54	Children of Henry XIV/I, divided the land. The younger two ruled jointly.
Kranichfeld and Lobenstein returned to Lower Greiz
Regency of Dorothea of Solms-Laubach (1572–1586)							Born two months after his father's death.
Henry II the Posthumous		10 June 1572; Gera; Son of Henry XVI / I and Dorothea of Solms-Laubach	10 June 1572 – 23 December 1635	Lordship of Gera (Younger Line)	Magdalena of Hohenlohe-Weikersheim-Langenburg (28 December 1572 – 2 April 1596); 7 February 1594; Weikersheim one child Magdalena of Schwarzburg-Rudolstadt; 22 May 1597; Rudolstadt seventeen children	23 December 1635; Gera aged 63	Born two months after his father's death.
Henry XVII the Elder		25 July 1561; Glauchau; First son of Henry XV and Maria Salomea of Oettingen-Oettingen	22 June 1578 – 8 February 1607	Lordship of Upper Greiz (Middle Line I)	Jutta of Waldeck-Eisenberg (12 November 1560 – 23 May 1621); 28 May 1583; Eisenberg no children	8 February 1607; Greiz aged 45	Children of Henry XV, ruled jointly. Henry XVIII dropped the co-rulership, but returned to government after the death of his brother.
Henry XVIII the Middle		28 February 1563; Weida; Second son of Henry XV and Maria Salomea of Oettingen-Oettingen	22 June 1578 – 1597 8 February 1607 – 16 January 1616	Lordship of Upper Greiz (Middle Line I)	Agnes Maria of Erbach; 5 May 1593; Greiz no children	16 January 1616; Schleiz aged 52	Children of Henry XV, ruled jointly. Henry XVIII dropped the co-rulership, but returned to government after the death of his brother.
Upper Greiz (Middle Line I) annexed to Lower Greiz (Elder Line)
Regency of Maria of Schönburg-Waldenburg (1604–1616)							Children of Henry V, divided their inheritance. Henry IV took the land of Upper Greiz (which was ruled by the original Middle Line (I) descended from Henry XV) and founded a new Reuss Middle Line (II). Henry V took over the entire Upper Greiz following is elder brother Henry III's death in 1609.
Henry III		12 December 1594; Third son of Henry V and Maria of Schönburg-Waldenburg	9 October 1604 – 12 September 1609	Lordship of Lower Greiz (Elder Line)	Unmarried	12 September 1609; Jena aged 14	Children of Henry V, divided their inheritance. Henry IV took the land of Upper Greiz (which was ruled by the original Middle Line (I) descended from Henry XV) and founded a new Reuss Middle Line (II). Henry V took over the entire Upper Greiz following is elder brother Henry III's death in 1609.
Henry IV the Middle		11 March 1597; Dolau; Fourth son of Henry V and Maria of Schönburg-Waldenburg	9 October 1604 – 25 August 1629	Lordship of Upper Greiz (Middle Line II)	Elisabeth Juliane of Salm-Neufville (1602–14 May 1653); May 1624; Arolsen four children	25 August 1629; Greiz aged 32	Children of Henry V, divided their inheritance. Henry IV took the land of Upper Greiz (which was ruled by the original Middle Line (I) descended from Henry XV) and founded a new Reuss Middle Line (II). Henry V took over the entire Upper Greiz following is elder brother Henry III's death in 1609.
Henry V		4 December 1602; Greiz; Fifth son of Henry V and Maria of Schönburg-Waldenburg	9 October 1604 – 7 March 1667	Lordship of Lower Greiz (Elder Line)	Anna Marie of Salm-Neufville (10 August 1606 – 20 November 1651); 28 November 1630; Greiz eight children	7 March 1667; Greiz aged 64	Children of Henry V, divided their inheritance. Henry IV took the land of Upper Greiz (which was ruled by the original Middle Line (I) descended from Henry XV) and founded a new Reuss Middle Line (II). Henry V took over the entire Upper Greiz following is elder brother Henry III's death in 1609.
Henry II		30 December 1575; Greiz; Second son of Henry II and Judith of Oettingen-Oettingen	24 May 1608 – 6 September 1639	Lordship of Burgk (Elder Line)	Magdalene of Putbus (21 February 1590 – 12 January 1665); 29 September 1609; Burgk nine children	6 September 1639; Burgk aged 63	Children of Henry II the Tall, divided the land. Henry III joined Henry II in a co-rulership, while Henry IV ruled from Dolau.
Henry III		22 December 1578; Greiz; Third son of Henry II and Judith of Oettingen-Oettingen	24 May 1608 – 24 January 1616	Lordship of Burgk (Elder Line)	Anna Magdalena von Schönburg-Waldenburg (1 February 1582 – 7 January 1615); 21 February 1602; Gera three children	24 January 1616; Gefel aged 37	Children of Henry II the Tall, divided the land. Henry III joined Henry II in a co-rulership, while Henry IV ruled from Dolau.
Henry IV		9 December 1580; Greiz; Fourth son of Henry II and Judith of Oettingen-Oettingen	24 May 1608 – 3 January 1636	Lordship of Burgk (at Dolau) (Elder Line)	Anna Genoveva of Stolberg-Stolberg (3 February 1580 – 18 December 1635); 1626 no children	3 January 1636; Dolau aged 55	Children of Henry II the Tall, divided the land. Henry III joined Henry II in a co-rulership, while Henry IV ruled from Dolau.
Dolau annexed to Upper Greiz
Regency of Elisabeth Juliane of Salm-Neufville (1629–1641)							In 1673 he was elevated to Count.
Henry I the Elder		3 May 1627; Greiz; Son of Henry IV and Elisabeth Juliane of Salm-Neufville	25 August 1629 – 8 March 1681	Lordship of Upper Greiz (1629–73) County of Upper Greiz (1673–81) (Middle Line II)	Sibylle Magdalene of Kirchberg (24 July 1624 – 24 February 1667); 10 August 1648; Schleiz eleven children Sibylle Juliane of Schwarzburg-Arnstadt (20 July 1646 – 5 April 1698); 2 April 1688; Greiz eight children	8 March 1681; Greiz aged 53	In 1673 he was elevated to Count.
Henry II the Other	´	14 August 1602; Gera; Second son of Henry II and Magdalena of Schwarzburg-Rudolstadt	23 December 1635 – 28 May 1670	Lordship of Gera (Younger Line)	Catherine Elisabeth of Schwarzburg-Sondershausen (28 August 1617 – 17 January 1701); 23 November 1642; Gera eight children	28 May 1670; Gera aged 67	Children of Henry II the Posthumous, ruled jointly until 1647, and then divided the land. Henry IX left no heirs and was succeeded by Henry III's sons.
Henry III		31 October 1603; Gera; Third son of Henry II and Magdalena of Schwarzburg-Rudolstadt	23 December 1635 – 12 July 1640	Lordship of Gera (at Saalburg) (Younger Line)	Elisabeth Juliane of Salm-Neufville (1602 - 14 May 1653); 23 November 1642; Gera eight children	12 July 1640; Karlsbad aged 36	Children of Henry II the Posthumous, ruled jointly until 1647, and then divided the land. Henry IX left no heirs and was succeeded by Henry III's sons.
Henry IX		22 May 1616; Schraplau; Ninth son of Henry II and Magdalena of Schwarzburg-Rudolstadt	23 December 1635 – 9 January 1666	Lordship of Schleiz (Younger Line)	Unmarried	9 January 1666; Schleiz aged 49	Children of Henry II the Posthumous, ruled jointly until 1647, and then divided the land. Henry IX left no heirs and was succeeded by Henry III's sons.
Henry X		9 September 1621; Gera; Tenth son of Henry II and Magdalena of Schwarzburg-Rudolstadt	23 December 1635 – 25 January 1671	Lordship of Lobenstein (Younger Line)	Maria Sibylle Reuss of Upper Greiz; 24 October 1647; Schleiz four children	25 January 1671; Bad Lobenstein aged 49	Children of Henry II the Posthumous, ruled jointly until 1647, and then divided the land. Henry IX left no heirs and was succeeded by Henry III's sons.
Schleiz absorbed into Saalburg
Henry III		15 September 1616; Hof; Son of Henry II and Magdalene of Putbus	6 September 1639 – 7 June 1640	Lordship of Burgk (Elder Line)	Unmarried	7 June 1640; Burgk aged 23	Left no heirs. Burgk returned briefly to Lower Greiz.
Burgk annexed to Lower Greiz
Regency of Elisabeth Juliane of Salm-Neufville and Henry II, Lord of Gera (1640–1653)							Received Saalburg from his father, and inherited Schleiz in 1666. In 1673 he was elevated to Count.
Henry I		26 March 1639; Schleiz; Son of Henry III, Lord of Gera and Elisabeth Juliane of Salm-Neufville	12 July 1640 – 9 January 1666	Lordship of Gera (at Saalburg) (Younger Line)	Esther of Hardegg-Glatz-Machlande (6 December 1634 – 21 September 1676); 9 February 1662; Vienna eight children Maximiliane of Hardegg-Glatz-Machlande (16 March 1644 – 27 August 1678); 22 October 1677; Regensburg one child Anna Elisabeth of Sinzendorf (12 May 1659 – 8 October 1683); 16 May 1680; Asch three children	18 March 1692; Bad Köstritz aged 52	Received Saalburg from his father, and inherited Schleiz in 1666. In 1673 he was elevated to Count.
Henry I		26 March 1639; Schleiz; Son of Henry III, Lord of Gera and Elisabeth Juliane of Salm-Neufville	9 January 1666 –18 March 1692	Lordship of Schleiz (1666–73) County of Schleiz (1673–92) (Younger Line)	Esther of Hardegg-Glatz-Machlande (6 December 1634 – 21 September 1676); 9 February 1662; Vienna eight children Maximiliane of Hardegg-Glatz-Machlande (16 March 1644 – 27 August 1678); 22 October 1677; Regensburg one child Anna Elisabeth of Sinzendorf (12 May 1659 – 8 October 1683); 16 May 1680; Asch three children	18 March 1692; Bad Köstritz aged 52	Received Saalburg from his father, and inherited Schleiz in 1666. In 1673 he was elevated to Count.
Henry II		8 January 1634; Greiz; Second son of Henry V and Anna Marie of Salm-Neufville	7 March 1667 – 5 October 1697	Lordship of Burgk (1667–73) County of Burgk (1673–97) (Elder Line)	Elisabeth Sibylle Reuss of Burgk (15 September 1627 – 9 January 1703); 8 January 1655; Greiz three children	5 October 1697; Gera aged 63	Children of Henry V, divided the land. This division saw a brief reappearance of Burgk, before being definitively annexed to Greiz.
Henry IV		5 August 1638; Greiz; Fourth son of Henry V and Anna Marie of Salm-Neufville	7 March 1667 – 21 February 1675	Lordship of Lower Greiz (1667–73) County of Lower Greiz (1673–75) (Elder Line)	Anna Dorothea of Ruppa (3 October 1651 – 17 June 1698); 31 October 1671; Greiz eleven children	21 February 1675; Hechingen aged 36	Children of Henry V, divided the land. This division saw a brief reappearance of Burgk, before being definitively annexed to Greiz.
Henry V		19 April 1645; Greiz; Fifth son of Henry V and Anna Marie of Salm-Neufville	7 March 1667 – 12 February 1698	Lordship of Lower Greiz (at Rothenthal) (1667–73) County of Lower Greiz (at Rothenthal) (1673–98) (Elder Line)	Angelique Desmier d'Olbreuse (1637-5 October 1688); 15 February 1678; Celle no children Christiane of Sayn-Wittgenstein-Homburg (10 January 1680 – 17 September 1724); 5 June 1697; Frankfurt am Main no children	12 February 1698; Greiz aged 52	Children of Henry V, divided the land. This division saw a brief reappearance of Burgk, before being definitively annexed to Greiz.
Burgk and Rothenthal annexed to Lower Greiz
Henry IV		13 March 1650; Gera; Son of Henry II and Catherine Elisabeth of Schwarzburg-Sondershausen	28 May 1670 – 13 March 1686	Lordship of Gera (1670–73) County of Gera (1673–86) (Younger Line)	Anna Dorothea of Schwarzburg-Sondershausen (18 August 1645 – 1 July 1716); 20 June 1672; Gera eight children	13 March 1686; Gera aged 36	
Henry III		16 December 1648; Bad Lobenstein; First son of Henry X and Maria Sibylle Reuss of Upper Greiz	5 January 1671 – 24 May 1710	Lordship of Lobenstein (Younger Line)	Marie Christiane of Leiningen-Westerburg; 22 October 1673; Bad Lobenstein fourteen children	24 May 1710; Gera aged 61	Children of Henry X, divided once more the land.
Henry V		18 May 1650; Bad Lobenstein; Second son of Henry X and Maria Sibylle Reuss of Upper Greiz	5 January 1671 – 31 May 1672	Lordship of Lobenstein (Younger Line)	Unmarried	31 May 1672; Wechselburg aged 22	Children of Henry X, divided once more the land.
Henry VIII		20 May 1652; Bad Lobenstein; Fourth son of Henry X and Maria Sibylle Reuss of Upper Greiz	5 January 1671 – 29 October 1711	Lordship of Lobenstein (at Hirschberg) (Younger Line)	Elisabeth of Bodenhausen (27 June 1650 – 7 May 1687); 3 March 1679; Muhldorf no children Sophia Juliane Reuss of Upper Greiz (25 December 1670 – 23 August 1696); 19/26 July 1688; Schleiz no children	29 October 1711; Hirschberg aged 59	Children of Henry X, divided once more the land.
Henry X		29 November 1662; Bad Lobenstein; Sixth son of Henry X and Maria Sibylle Reuss of Upper Greiz	25 January 1671 – 10 June 1711	Lordship of Ebersdorf (1671–73) County of Ebersdorf (1673–1711) (Younger Line)	Erdmuthe Benigna of Solms-Laubach; 20 November 1694; Laubach eight children	10 June 1711; Saalburg-Ebersdorf aged 48	Children of Henry X, divided once more the land.
Hirschberg reabsorbed into Lobenstein
Regency of Anna Dorothea of Ruppa (1675–1686)							Children of Henry IV, ruled jointly.
Henry XIII		29 September 1672; Oppurg; First son of Henry IV and Anna Dorothea of Ruppa	21 February 1675 – 14 April 1733	County of Lower Greiz (Elder Line)	Sophie Elisabeth of Stolberg-Wernigerode (6 February 1676 – 14 November 1729); 14 August 1697; Ilsenburg thirteen children	14 April 1733; Greiz aged 60	Children of Henry IV, ruled jointly.
Henry XIV		14 January 1674; Burgk; Second son of Henry IV and Anna Dorothea of Ruppa	21 February 1675 – 20 January 1682	County of Lower Greiz (Elder Line)	Unmarried	20 January 1682; Lüneburg aged 8	Children of Henry IV, ruled jointly.
Henry VI		7 August 1649; Greiz; Son of Henry I and Sibylle Magdalene of Kirchberg	8 March 1681 – 11 October 1697	County of Upper Greiz (Middle Line II)	Amalie Juliane Reuss of Lower Greiz (4 October 1636 – 25 December 1688); 29 July 1674; Forst one child Henriette Amalie of Friesen; 3 May 1691; Leipzig three children	11 October 1697; Szeged aged 48	Children of Henry I, divided their inheritance; Henry VI and Henry XV formed a co-rulership in Greiz, while Henry XVI ruled from Dolau. The latter left no heirs, and Dolau was reabsorbed in Greiz.
Henry XV		2 January 1676; Greiz; Second son of Henry I and Sibylle Juliane of Schwarzburg-Arnstadt	8 March 1681 – 29 September 1690	County of Upper Greiz (Middle Line II)	Unmarried	29 September 1690; Greiz aged 14	Children of Henry I, divided their inheritance; Henry VI and Henry XV formed a co-rulership in Greiz, while Henry XVI ruled from Dolau. The latter left no heirs, and Dolau was reabsorbed in Greiz.
Henry XVI		3 November 1678; Arnstadt; Third son of Henry I and Sibylle Juliane of Schwarzburg-Arnstadt	8 March 1681 – 24 April 1698	County of Upper Greiz (at Dolau) (Middle Line II)	Unmarried	24 April 1698; Greiz aged 19	Children of Henry I, divided their inheritance; Henry VI and Henry XV formed a co-rulership in Greiz, while Henry XVI ruled from Dolau. The latter left no heirs, and Dolau was reabsorbed in Greiz.
Dolau annexed to Upper Greiz
Regency of Anna Dorothea of Schwarzburg-Sondershausen and Henry I, Count of Reuss-Schleiz (1686-1691)							Left no heirs. He was succeeded by his brother.
Henry XVIII		21 March 1677; Gera; Fourth son of Henry IV and Anna Dorothea of Schwarzburg-Sondershausen	13 March 1686 – 25 November 1735	County of Gera (Younger Line)	Unmarried	25 November 1735; Gera aged 58	Left no heirs. He was succeeded by his brother.
Henry XI		12/29 April 1669; Schleiz; Son of Henry I and Esther of Hardegg-Glatz-Machlande	18 March 1692 – 28 July 1726	County of Schleiz (Younger Line)	Johanna Dorothea of Tattenbach-Geilsdorf (13 March 1675 – 26 October 1714); 1 September 1692; Geilsdorf one child Augusta Dorothea of Hohenlohe-Langenburg (2/3 January 1678 – 9 May 1740); 8 May 1715; Langenburg two children	28 July 1726; Schleiz aged 57	Children of Henry I of Schleiz, divided their inheritance.
Henry XXIV		26 July 1681; Schleiz; Son of Henry I and Anna Elisabeth of Sinzendorf	18 March 1692 – 24 July 1748	County of Köstritz (Younger Line)	Emilia Eleonora of Promnitz-Dittersbach; 6 May 1704; Wrocław twelve children	24 July 1748; Greiz aged 66	Children of Henry I of Schleiz, divided their inheritance.
Regency of Henriette Amalie of Friesen (1697–1707)							Left no heirs, and died young. He was succeeded by his brother.
Henry I		29 December 1693; Dresden; First son of Henry VI and Henriette Amalie of Friesen	11 October 1697 – 7 September 1714	County of Upper Greiz (Middle Line II)	Unmarried	7 September 1714; Paris aged 20	Left no heirs, and died young. He was succeeded by his brother.
Henry XV		24 September 1674; Bad Lobenstein; First son of Henry III and Marie Christiane of Leiningen-Westerburg	24 May 1710 – 12 May 1739	County of Lobenstein (Younger Line)	Ernestine Eleonore von Schönburg-Waldenburg (2 November 1677 – 2 August 1741); 21 July 1701; Waldenburg fourteen children	12 May 1739; Bad Lobenstein aged 64	Children of Henry III of Lobenstein, divided the land.
Henry XXVI		16 September 1681; Bad Lobenstein; Fifth son of Henry III and Marie Christiane of Leiningen-Westerburg	24 May 1710 – 21 June 1730	County of Lobenstein (at Selbitz) (Younger Line)	Juliane Rebecca of Tattenbach-Selbitz (31 August 1692 – 10 September 1739); 31 March 1715; Selbitz twelve children	21 June 1730; Selbitz aged 48	Children of Henry III of Lobenstein, divided the land.
Regency of Erdmuthe Benigna of Solms-Laubach (1711–1713)							
Henry XXIX		21 July 1699; Saalburg-Ebersdorf; Son of Henry X and Erdmuthe Benigna of Solms-Laubach	10 June 1711 – 22 May 1747	County of Ebersdorf (Younger Line)	Sophie Theodora of Castell-Remlingen; 7 September 1721; Castell thirteen children	22 May 1747; Herrnhaag aged 47	
Henry II		4 February 1696; Dresden; Second son of Henry VI and Henriette Amalie of Friesen	7 September 1714 – 17 November 1722	County of Upper Greiz (Middle Line II)	Charlotte Sophie of Bothmer; 22 October 1715; Dresden five children	17 November 1722; Greiz aged 26	
Regency of Charlotte Sophie of Bothmer (1722–1723)							Died as a child, and left no heirs. He was succeeded by his brother.
Henry IX		31 December 1718; Greiz; Second son of Henry II and Charlotte Sophie of Bothmer	17 November 1722 – 17 November 1723	County of Upper Greiz (Middle Line II)	Unmarried	17 March 1723; Greiz aged 5	Died as a child, and left no heirs. He was succeeded by his brother.
Regency of Charlotte Sophie of Bothmer (1723–1734)							He was elevated to princely status in 1778.
Henry XI		18 March 1722; Greiz; Fourth son of Henry II and Charlotte Sophie of Bothmer	17 November 1723 – 28 June 1800	County of Upper Greiz (1723–78) Principality of Greiz (1778–1800) (Middle Line II)	Conradine Eleonore Reuss of Köstritz (22 December 1719 – 2 February 1770); 4 April 1743; Köstritz eleven children Christine Albertine of Leiningen-Dagsburg-Falkenburg (25 November 1732 – 4 October 1809); 25 October 1770; Frankfurt am Main no children	28 June 1800; Greiz aged 78	He was elevated to princely status in 1778.
Henry I		10 March 1695; Schleiz; Son of Henry XI and Johanna Dorothea of Tattenbach-Geilsdorf	28 July 1726 – 6 December 1744	County of Schleiz (Younger Line)	Juliane Dorothea of Löwenstein-Virneburg (8 July 1694 – 15 February 1734); 7 March 1721; Gaildorf three children	6 December 1744; Schleiz aged 49	Left no heirs. He was succeeded by his brother.
Henry XI		31 December 1715; Selbitz; First son of Henry XXVI and Juliane Rebecca of Tattenbach-Selbitz	21 June 1730 – 22 August 1745	County of Lobenstein (at Selbitz) (Younger Line)	Unmarried	22 August 1745; Saalburg-Ebersdorf aged 29	Left no descendants. He was succeeded by his brother.
Henry III		26 January 1701; Greiz; Son of Henry XIII and Sophie Elisabeth of Stolberg-Wernigerode	14 April 1733 – 17 March 1768	County of Lower Greiz (Elder Line)	Unmarried	17 March 1768; Greiz	Left no descendants. After his death, the Lower Greiz Elder line went extinct.
Lower Greiz annexed to Upper Greiz
Henry XXV		27 August 1681; Gera; Seventh son of Henry IV and Anna Dorothea of Schwarzburg-Sondershausen	25 November 1735 – 13 March 1748	County of Gera (Younger Line)	Justine Eleonore Sophie of Giech-Thurnau (12 December 1698 - 1 February 1718); 21 February 1717; Thurnau no children Sophia Marie of the Palatinate-Gelnhausen (5 April 1702 – 13 November 1761); 24 August 1722; Sondershausen four children	13 March 1748; Gera aged 66	
Henry II		19 July 1702; Bad Lobenstein; Son of Henry XV and Ernestine Eleonore von Schönburg-Waldenburg	12 May 1739 – 6 May 1782	County of Lobenstein (Younger Line)	Juliane Dorothea Charlotte of Hochberg-Fürstenstein (10 June 1713 – 22 May 1757); 23 November 1735; Fürstenstein two children	6 May 1782; Bad Lobenstein aged 79	
Henry XII		15 May 1716; Schleiz; Son of Henry XI and Augusta Dorothea of Hohenlohe-Langenburg	6 December 1744 – 25 January 1784	County of Schleiz (Younger Line)	Christine of Erbach-Schönberg (5 May 1721 – 26 November 1769); 2 October 1742; Schönberg five children Christiane Ferdinandine of Isenburg-Philippseich (24 August 1740 – 7 December 1822); 13 July 1770; Philippseich two children	25 January 1784; Kirschkau aged 67	
Henry XIX		16 October 1720; Selbitz; Third son of Henry XXVI and Juliane Rebecca of Tattenbach-Selbitz	22 August 1745 – 1778	County of Lobenstein (at Selbitz) (Younger Line)	Unmarried	30 November 1783; Selbitz aged 53	Abdicated of Selbitz, giving it to his nephew Henry LIV, who became ruler of Lobenstein.
Selbitz annexed to Lobenstein
Henry XXIV		22 January 1724; Saalburg-Ebersdorf; Son of Henry XXIX and Sophie Theodora of Castell-Remlingen	22 May 1747 – 13 May 1779	County of Ebersdorf (Younger Line)	Caroline Ernestine of Erbach-Schönberg; 28 June 1754; Thurnau seven children	13 May 1779; Saalburg-Ebersdorf aged 55	
Henry XXX		24 April 1727; Gera; Son of Henry XXV and Sophia Marie of the Palatinate-Gelnhausen	13 March 1748 – 26 April 1802	County of Gera (Younger Line)	Louise Christiane of the Palatinate-Gelnhausen; 28 October 1773; Hungen no children	26 April 1802; Gera aged 75	Left no descendants. His property got divided between the other territories of the Younger Reuss line.
Gera divided between the other Younger Line territories
Henry VI		1 July 1707; Dürrröhrsdorf-Dittersbach; Second son of Henry XXIV and Emilia Eleonora of Promnitz-Dittersbach	24 July 1748 – 1 May 1783	Elder County of Köstritz (Younger Line)	Henrietta Juana Francisca Susanna Casado y Huguetan (2 May 1725 – 6 January 1761); 16 September 1746; Copenhagen seven children	1 May 1783; Bad Köstritz aged 75	Children of Henry XXIV, divided their inheritance and founded new lines: Henry VI founded the Elder County; Henry IX the Middle County and Henry XXIII the Younger County.
Henry IX		15 September 1711; Bad Köstritz; Fifth son of Henry XXIV and Emilia Eleonora of Promnitz-Dittersbach	24 July 1748 – 16 September 1780	Middle County of Köstritz (Younger Line)	Amalie Esperance of Wartensleben-Flodroff (17 March 1715 – 22 April 1787); 7 June 1743; Dorth (near Deventer) nine children	16 September 1780; Berlin aged 69	Children of Henry XXIV, divided their inheritance and founded new lines: Henry VI founded the Elder County; Henry IX the Middle County and Henry XXIII the Younger County.
Henry XXIII		9 December 1722; Bad Köstritz; Ninth son of Henry XXIV and Emilia Eleonora of Promnitz-Dittersbach	24 July 1748 – 3 September 1787	Younger County of Köstritz (Younger Line)	Ernestine Henriette of Schönburg-Forderglauchau (2 December 1736 – 10 December 1768); 13 February 1754; Bad Köstritz five children Friederike Dorothea of Brandenstein (7 December 1727 – 6 July 1807); 5 February 1780; Pölzig no children	3 September 1787; Bad Köstritz aged 64	Children of Henry XXIV, divided their inheritance and founded new lines: Henry VI founded the Elder County; Henry IX the Middle County and Henry XXIII the Younger County.
Henry LI		16 May 1761; Saalburg-Ebersdorf; Son of Henry XXIV and Caroline Ernestine of Erbach-Schönberg	13 May 1779 – 10 July 1822	County of Ebersdorf (1779–1806) Principality of Ebersdorf (1806–22) (Younger Line)	Louise Henriette of Hoym (30 March 1772 – 19 April 1832); 16 August 1791; Gera three children	10 July 1822; Saalburg-Ebersdorf aged 61	In 1806 he was elevated to princely status.
Henry XXXVIII		9 October 1748; Berlin; Son of Henry IX and Amalie Esperance of Wartensleben-Flodroff	16 September 1780 – 10 April 1835	Middle County of Köstritz (Younger Line) (until 1806) Middle Principality of Köstritz (Younger Line) (from 1806)	Henriette Friederike Ottilie of Schmettow-Stonsdorf (23 July 1753 – 19 August 1786); 17 July 1784; Wolfshagen one child Johanne Friederike Fletscher (24 March 1756 – 28 June 1815); 13 February 1792; Schloss Baruth no children	10 April 1835; Jänkendorf aged 86	Left no heirs, and was succeeded by his nephew.
Henry XXXV		19 November 1738; Bad Lobenstein; Son of Henry II and Juliane Dorothea Charlotte of Hochberg-Fürstenstein	6 May 1782 – 30 March 1805	County of Lobenstein (Younger Line)	Unmarried	30 March 1805; Paris aged 66	After his death the county fell to the dispossessed Selbitz line (since the loss of Selbitz in 1778).
Henry XLIII		12 April 1752; Copenhagen; Son of Henry VI and Henrietta Juana Francisca Susanna Casado y Huguetan	1 May 1783 – 22 September 1814	Elder County of Köstritz (Younger Line) (until 1806) Elder Principality of Köstritz (Younger Line) (from 1806)	Louise Christine Reuss of Ebersdorf (2 June 1759 – 5 December 1840); 1 June 1781; Ebersdorf five children	22 September 1814; Mannheim aged 62	
Henry XLII		27 February 1752; Löhma; Son of Henry XII and Christine of Erbach-Schönberg	25 January 1784 – 1806	County of Schleiz (Younger Line)	Caroline Henriette of Hohenlohe-Kirchberg (11 June 1761 – 22 December 1849); 10 June 1779; Kirchberg an der Jagst eight children	17 April 1818; Schleiz aged 66	One of the inheritors of Gera, in 1806 moved his capital there, and founded the Principality of Gera, being given the princely status in 1806.
Henry XLII		27 February 1752; Löhma; Son of Henry XII and Christine of Erbach-Schönberg	1806 – 17 April 1818	Principality of Gera (Younger Line)	Caroline Henriette of Hohenlohe-Kirchberg (11 June 1761 – 22 December 1849); 10 June 1779; Kirchberg an der Jagst eight children	17 April 1818; Schleiz aged 66	One of the inheritors of Gera, in 1806 moved his capital there, and founded the Principality of Gera, being given the princely status in 1806.
Henry XLVII		27 February 1756; Bad Köstritz; First son of Henry XXIII| and Ernestine Henriette of Schönburg-Forderglauchau	3 September 1787 – 7 March 1833	Younger County of Köstritz (Younger Line) (until 1806) Younger Principality of Köstritz (Younger Line) (from 1806)	Unmarried	7 March 1833; Lichtenstein aged 77	Left no heirs and was succeeded by his brother.
Henry XIII		16 February 1747; Greiz; Son of Henry XI and Conradine Eleonore Reuss of Köstritz	28 June 1800 – 29 January 1817	Principality of Greiz (Middle Line II)	Louise Wilhelmine of Nassau-Weilburg; 9 January 1786; Kirchheimbolanden four children	29 January 1817; Greiz aged 69	
Henry LIV		8 October 1767; Herrnhut; Son of Prince Henry (XXV) Reuss of Selbitz and Maria Elisabeth Reuss of Ebersdorf	30 March 1805 – 17 May 1824	County of Lobenstein (1805–06) Principality of Lobenstein (1806–22) (Younger Line)	Marie of Stolberg-Wernigerode (4 May 1774 – 16 June 1810); 20 June 1803; Wernigerode no children Franziska Reuss of Köstritz (7 December 1788 – 17 June 1843); 31 May 1811; Mannheim no children	17 May 1824; Bad Lobenstein aged 56	Nephew of Henry XIX of Selbitz, became the heir of the main Lobenstein branch. He was elevated to princely status in 1806. Left no heirs.
Lobenstein annexed to Ebersdorf
Henry LXIV		31 March 1787; Bad Köstritz; Son of Henry XLIII and Louise Christine Reuss of Ebersdorf	22 September 1814 – 15 September 1856	Elder Principality of Köstritz (Younger Line)	Unmarried	15 September 1856; Ernstbrunn aged 69	Left no heirs, and was succeeded by his cousin.
Henry XIX		1 March 1790; Offenbach; Second son of Henry XIII and Louise Wilhelmine of Nassau-Weilburg	29 January 1817 – 31 October 1836	Principality of Greiz (Middle Line II)	Gasparine of Rohan-Rochefort; 7 January 1822; Prague two children	31 October 1836; Greiz aged 46	Left no male heirs, and was succeeded by his brother.
Henry LXII		31 May 1785; Schleiz; First son of Henry XLII and Caroline Henriette of Hohenlohe-Kirchberg	17 April 1818 – 19 June 1854	Principality of Gera (Reuss Younger Line)	Unmarried	19 June 1854; Schleiz aged 69	From 1848 onwards the Principality would be alternatively called Principality of the Reuss Younger Line, as it reunited most of the Reuss Younger Line lands. Left no heirs. He was succeeded by his brother.
Henry LXXII		27 March 1797; Saalburg-Ebersdorf; Son of Henry LI and Louise Henriette of Hoym	10 July 1822 – 1848	Principality of Ebersdorf (Younger Line)	Unmarried	17 February 1853; Saalburg-Ebersdorf aged 55	Abdicated in 1848, due to civil unrest in connection with the revolutions that spread through Germany and elsewhere in Europe that year.
Ebersdorf annexed to Schleiz
Henry XLIX		16 October 1759; Bad Köstritz; Second son of Henry XXIII and Ernestine Henriette of Schönburg-Forderglauchau	7 March 1833 – 29 February 1840	Younger Principality of Köstritz (Younger Line)	Unmarried	29 February 1840; Ichtershausen	Left no heirs and was succeeded by his brother.
Henry LXIII		18 June 1786; Berlin; Son of Prince Henry (XLIV) Reuss of Middle Köstritz and Wilhelmine Friederike von Geuder	10 April 1835 – 27 September 1841	Middle Principality of Köstritz (Younger Line)	Eleonore of Stolberg-Wernigerode (26 September 1801 – 14 March 1827); 21 February 1819; Wernigerode Castle six children Caroline of Stolberg-Wernigerode (16 December 1806 – 26 August 1896); 11 May 1828; Wernigerode Castle six children	27 September 1841; Stonsdorf aged 55	Nephew of Henry XXXVIII.
Henry XX		29 June 1794; Offenbach; Third son of Henry XIII and Louise Wilhelmine of Nassau-Weilburg	32 October 1836 – 8 November 1859	Principality of Greiz (Middle Line II)	Sophia Maria Theresa of Löwenstein-Wertheim-Rosenberg (18 September 1809 – 21 July 1838); 25 November 1834; Prague no children Caroline of Hesse-Homburg; 1 October 1839; Bad Homburg five children	8 November 1859; Greiz aged 65	
Henry LII		21 September 1763; Bad Köstritz; Third son of Henry XXIII and Ernestine Henriette of Schönburg-Forderglauchau	29 February 1840 – 23 February 1851	Younger Principality of Köstritz (Younger Line)	Unmarried	23 February 1851; Munich aged 87	Left no heirs and was succeeded by his nephew.
Henry IV		26 April 1821; Son of Henry LXIII and Eleonore of Stolberg-Wernigerode	27 September 1841 – 25 July 1894	Middle Principality of Köstritz (Younger Line)	Louise Caroline Reuss of Greiz; 27 December 1854; Greiz nine children	25 July 1894 aged 73	
Henry LXXIII		31 July 1798; London; Son of Prince Henry (LV) Reuss of Younger Köstritz and Marie Justine of Watteville	23 February 1851 – 16 January 1855	Younger Principality of Köstritz (Younger Line)	Unmarried	16 January 1855; London aged 56	Nephew of Henry LII; Left no heirs and was succeeded by his nephew.
Henry LXVII		20 October 1789; Schleiz; Second son of Henry XLII and Caroline Henriette of Hohenlohe-Kirchberg	19 June 1854 – 11 July 1867	Principality of Gera (Reuss Younger Line)	Sophie Adelaide Reuss of Ebersdorf; 18 April 1820; Ebersdorf eight children	Brother of Henry LXII.	11 July 1867; Gera aged 77
Henry XVIII		14 May 1847; Leipzig; Son of Prince Henry (II) Reuss of Younger Köstritz and Clothilde Charlotte Sophie of Castell-Castell	18 January 1855 – 15 August 1911	Younger Principality of Köstritz (Younger Line)	Friederike Wilhelmine Charlotte of Mecklenburg-Schwerin; 17 November 1886; Schwerin three children	15 August 1911 between Schweinfurt and Würzburg aged 64	Nephew of Henry LXXIII.
Henry LXIX		19 May 1792; Son of Prince Henry Reuss of Elder Köstritz and Henrietta Antonia of Schönburg-Forderglauchau	15 September 1856 – 1 February 1878	Elder Principality of Köstritz (Younger Line)	Matilda Harriet Elizabeth Locke (12 May 1804 – 29 December 1877); 5 November 1834; Florence no children	1 February 1878 aged 85	Nephew of Henry XLIII and cousin of Henry LXIV. The line went extinct after his death.
Elder Principality of Köstritz annexed to the Middle Principality of Köstritz
Regency of Caroline of Hesse-Homburg (1859–1867)							
Henry XXII		28 March 1846; Greiz; Son of Henry XX and Caroline of Hesse-Homburg	8 November 1859 – 19 April 1902	Principality of Greiz (Middle Line II)	Ida of Schaumburg-Lippe; 8 October 1872; Bückeburg six children	19 April 1902; Greiz aged 56	
Henry XIV		28 May 1832; Coburg; Son of Henry LXVII and Sophie Adelaide Reuss of Ebersdorf	11 July 1867 – 29 March 1913	Principality of Gera (Reuss Younger Line)	Agnes of Württemberg; 6 February 1858; Karlsruhe two children Friederike Gratz (28 February 1851 – 22 May 1907); 14 February 1890; Gera (morganatic) one child	29 March 1913; Schleiz aged 80	
Henry XXIV		8 December 1855; Trebschen; Son of Henry IV and Louise Caroline Reuss of Greiz	25 July 1894 – 2 October 1910	Middle Principality of Köstritz (Younger Line)	Emma Elisabeth Reuss of Middle Köstritz (10 July 1860 – 2 December 1931); 27 May 1884; Jänkendorf five children		2 October 1910; Ernstbrunn aged 54
Henry XXIV		20 March 1878; Greiz; Son of Henry XXII and Ida of Schaumburg-Lippe	19 April 1902 – 22 November 1918	Principality of Greiz (Middle Line II)	Unmarried	13 October 1927; Greiz aged 49	Abolition of the monarchy in 1918. He remained as head of his branch of the family until his death. As he left no heirs, his titles passed to the Prince of Gera, Henry XXVII.
Henry XXXIX		23 July 1891; Ernstbrunn; Son of Henry XXIV and Emma Elisabeth Reuss of Middle Köstritz	2 October 1910 – 22 November 1918	Middle Principality of Köstritz (Younger Line)	Antonia Emma Elisabeth of Castell-Castell (18 April 1896 – 4 May 1971); 7 August 1918; Castell six children	24 February 1946; Salzburg aged 54	Abolition of the monarchy in 1918. He remained as head of his branch of the family until his death.
Henry XXXVII		1 November 1888; Ludwigslust; Son of Henry XVIII and Friederike Wilhelmine Charlotte of Mecklenburg-Schwerin	15 August 1911 – 22 November 1918	Younger Principality of Köstritz (Younger Line)	Frieda Mijotki (25 September 1891 – 2 October 1957); 14 November 1922; Berlin (morganatic, annulled 21 February 1930) no children Stephanie Clemm of Hohenberg (25 December 1900 – 10 February 1990); 7 August 1933; Garmisch-Partenkirchen two children	9 February 1964; Garmisch-Partenkirchen	Abolition of the monarchy in 1918. He remained as head of his branch of the family until his death.
Henry XXVII		10 November 1858; Gera; Son of Henry XIV and Agnes of Württemberg	29 March 1913 – 22 November 1918	Principality of Gera (Reuss Younger Line)	Elise of Hohenlohe-Langenburg; 11 November 1884; Langenburg five children	21 November 1928; Gera	Abolition of the monarchy in 1918. He remained as head of his branch of the family until his death.

== Side branch member's links to Reichsbürger movement ==
On 7 December 2022, German police conducted an operation which resulted in the arrest of 25 alleged members of the far-right group Reichsbürger, including a member of the Köstritz branch of the House of Reuss, identified as Heinrich XIII Prince Reuss. The suspects arrested in the operation were allegedly planning to overturn the existing German government, and instate Heinrich XIII as the new German de facto leader. His distant cousin Heinrich XIV Prince Reuss, the head and speaker of the House of Reuss and its family association, had previously referred to Heinrich XIII as "a confused old man who had been radicalised through disappointments". On behalf of the family association, which Heinrich XIII had left years ago, Heinrich XIV sharply distanced himself from him again after he was arrested, saying that "30 years ago he was a modern businessman, but nowadays he is fooled by all sorts of conspiracy theories". In the line of succession to the House of Reuss, Heinrich XIII only ranked 17th, and the head of the house called him "a marginal figure". He said his behaviour was a "catastrophe" for the family, whose heritage as tolerant and cosmopolitan rulers was now associated with "terrorists and reactionaries". He believes Reuss' anti-government views derive from his resentment at the German judicial system for its failure to recognize his claims to family properties expropriated at the end of World War II.

== In fiction ==
A young Reuss count, sent to the 1815 Congress of Vienna, is the protagonist of the 1899 operetta Wiener Blut and the 1942 film based on it. Much of the hilarity of the film centers around his impossible name of "Reuss-Schleiz-Greiz".

== See also ==
- List of the burgraves of Meissen
- Ríos (disambiguation)

== Sources ==
- Thomas Gehrlein: Das Haus Reuß (The House of Reuss), volumes I-IV. Publisher: Börde-Verlag, Werl 2015, ISBN 978-3-9815864-6-6 or ISBN 978-3-9815864-7-3.
- Friedrich Majer: Chronik des Fürstlichen Hauses der Reussen von Plauen. (Chronicle of the Princely House Reuss of Plauen), Weimar and Leipzig 1811 (online version).
- Sigismund Stucke: Die Reußen und ihr Land. Die Geschichte einer süddeutschen Dynastie. (The Reuss and their country. The history of a southern German dynasty), St. Michael 1984, ISBN 3-7053-1954-X. reissue: publisher Arnshaugk Verlag, Neustadt 2022, ISBN 978-3-95930-252-4.
- Almanach de Gotha:
  - Gothaischer Hofkalender 1781, Gotha 1780 (first publication).
  - Gothaischer Hofkalender zum Nutzen und Vergnügen auf das Jahr 1792, C. W. Ettinger, Gotha 1791. online version
  - Gothaischer Hofkalender 1877, Gotha 1876. online version
  - Gothaischer Hofkalender 1894, Gotha 1893. online version
- Gothaisches Genealogisches Handbuch, Fürstliche Häuser (Gotha Genealogical Handbook −german article−, Princely Houses), 2015, 1. Abteilung (first department), vol 1 of the complete series of the GGH books, publisher: Verlag des Deutschen Adelsarchivs (Publisher of the German Nobility Archive), Marburg 2015, pp. 227–247; 628–634. ISBN 978-3-9817243-0-1.
