= Heinrich IX, Count Reuss of Köstritz =

- Born: 15 September 1711; Köstritz
- Died: 16 September 1780 (aged 69); Berlin
- Buried: Garrison Church in Berlin
- Noble family: House of Reuss
- Spouses: Countess Amalie of Wartensleben and Flodroff
- Father: Heinrich XXIV, Count Reuss of Köstritz
- Mother: Baroness Eleonore of Promnitz-Dittersbach

Henry IX Reuss, Count of Köstritz (15 September 1711 in Köstritz – 16 September 1780 in Berlin) was a member of the House of Reuss. Henry IX was the founder of the middle branch Köstritz Reuss.

== Life ==
Henry IX was a son of Count Henry XXIV and his wife, Baroness Eleonore of Promnitz-Dittersbach (1688-1776).

Henry earned a degree in Law and Political Sciences. After his grand tour, he went to the estates of his mother in Silesia, where he took up a legal office. Through his family connections he met with the future King Frederick II of Prussia. He then took up a position as councillor at the Kammergericht in Berlin. From 21 January 1752 to 1763 he was the president of the Prussian Supreme Tribunal, then the fourth senate of the Kammergericht.

From 1762 to 1769, he was Henry Royal Prussian Postmaster General and Chief of the postal system. He later rose to become directing minister, top civil servant and close personal advisor to Frederick the Great.

He died in 1780 and was buried in the Garrison Church in Berlin.

== Marriage and issue ==
Henry IX married on 7 June 1743 in Dorth, near Deventer, to Countess Amalie of Watrensleben (1715-1787), a daughter of Count Charles of Wartensleben and Flodroff and his wife Johanna Margarita Huysseman von Cattendyck. With her he had the following nine children:

- Emily (1745-1754)
- Sophie (1746-1746)
- Henry XXXVII (1747-1774)
- Henry XXXVIII (1748-1835), Count Reuss of Köstritz
- Henry XXXIX (1750-1815)
- Henry XLI (1751-1753)
- Henry XLIV (1753-1832), Prince Reuss of Köstritz
- Louise (1756-1807), married in 1792 to Baron Charles of Knobelsdorff
- Henry L (1760-1764)
