= Heinrich XXIV, Count Reuss of Köstritz =

Heinrich XXIV, Count Reuss of Köstritz (26 July 1681 in Schleiz — 24 July 1748 in Greiz) was Count Reuss of Köstritz from 1692 to his death. He was the founder of the Reuss-Köstritz line of the House of Reuss.

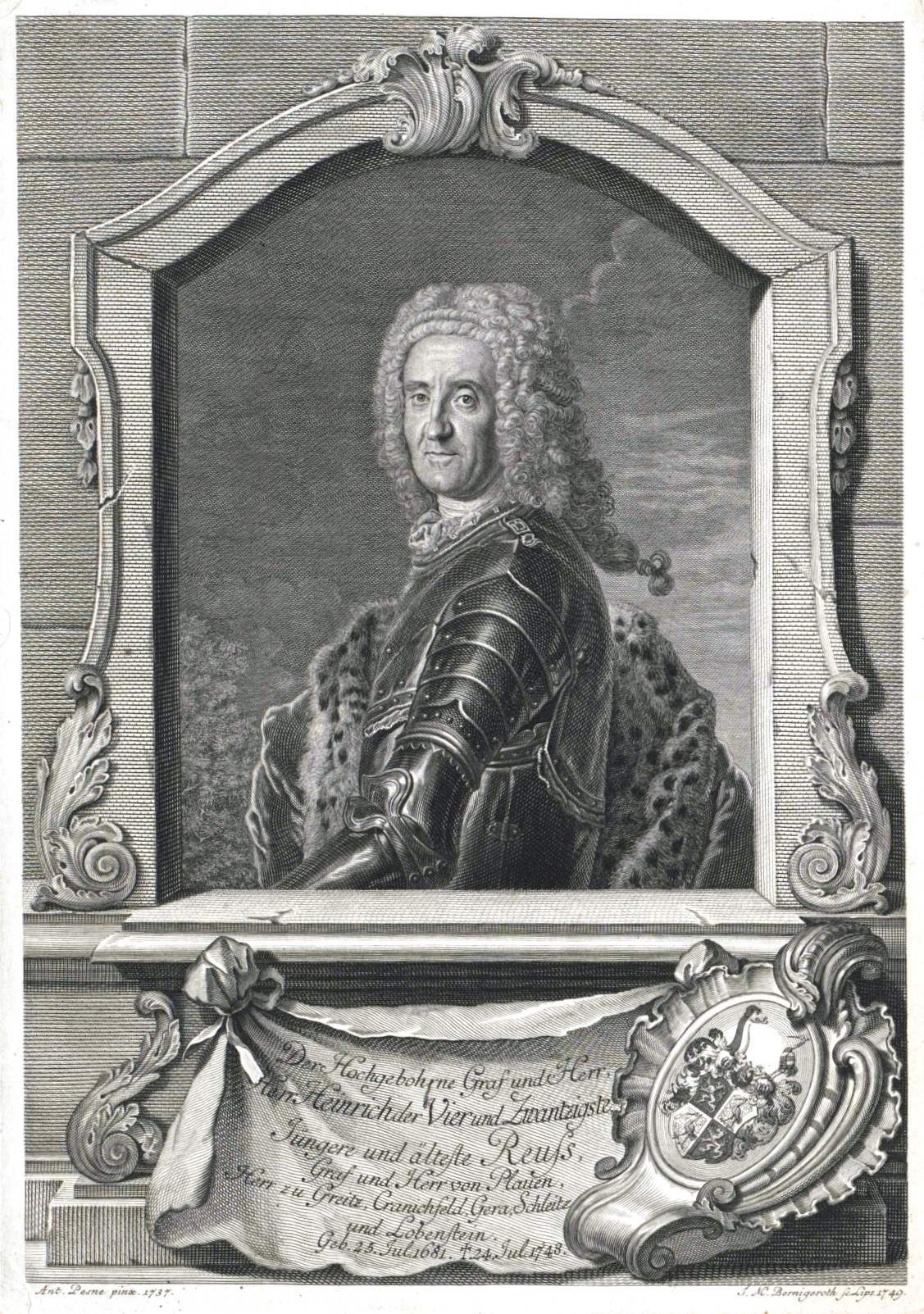
Heinrich XXIV, Count Reuss of Köstritz

== Marriage and issues ==
On 6 May 1704, Heinrich XXIV married Baroness Eleonore of Promnitz-Dittersbach. They had following children:

- Heinrich V (1706–1713)
- Heinrich VI (1707–1783)
- Heinrich VIII (1708–1710)
- Luise (1710–1756)
- Heinrich IX (1711–1780)
- Sophia (1712–1781)
- Heinrich X (1715–1741)
- Conradina Eleonora (1719–1770), married Heinrich XI of Greiz in 1743
- Heinrich XXIII (1722–1787)
