= Bertha of Vohburg =

Bertha of Vohburg (13th-century), was an Austrian noblewoman and ruling vassal.

She was a suo jure lady of Greiz, Hof, Regnitztal, Ronnenburg and Plauen (Austria) in her own right in 1200–1209.

Her father was Margrave of Vohburg. Her mother is not known to us today. Bertha was likely the eldest daughter or the only child of her parents.

She married Henry II "der Reiche" of Reuss, Weida and Gera and they had two sons, Henry III and Henry IV.
