= Henry X of Reuss-Lobenstein =

Henry X, Count of Reuss-Lobenstein
- Born: 9 September 1621; Gera
- Died: 25 January 1671 (aged 49); Lobenstein
- Noble family: Reuss-Lobenstein
- Spouse: Maria Sibylla of Reuss-Obergreiz
- Father: Henry II, Count of Reuss-Gera
- Mother: Magdalena of Schwarzburg-Rudolstadt

Henry X, Count of Reuss-Lobenstein (9 September 1621, in Gera – 25 January 1671, in Lobenstein) was a German nobleman, and rector of the University of Leipzig.

== Life ==
Henry X was the son of Henry II "the Posthumous" of Reuss-Gera by his second wife, Countess Magdalene of Schwarzburg-Rudolstadt (1580-1652). After his father died in 1635, he was raised by his elder brothers Henry II (1602–1670) and Henry III (1603–1640). He continued his education at the University of Leipzig. In the winter semester of 1641, he was elected Rector, a post he held until the summer semester of 1643.

When the Principality of Reuss Younger Line was divided in 1647, Henry X received the Lordship of Lobenstein, minus the Lordship of Saalburg, which was split off and added to Reuss-Gera. Thus he became the found of the Reuss-Lobenstein line of the Younger House of Reuss.

In 1653, he visited the Diet of Augsburg. In 1654, he purchased the Castle and Manor of Hirschberg from the von Beulwitz family. In 1666, his brother Henry IX died without an heir, and so he inherited parts of Reuss-Schleiz. In 1670, his eldest brother, Henry II, died and Henry X became the senior member of the House of Reuss.

After his death, his sons ruled Reuss-Lobenstein jointly for a few years and then divided it.

The Reuss-Lobenstein line died out in the male line in 1853.

== Marriage and issue ==
On 24 October 1647, Henry X married Maria Sibylla (4 August 1625 – 21 May 1675), the daughter of Henry IV of Reuss-Obergreiz from the Elder line. They had 12 children:

- Henry III (16 December 1648 – 24 May 1710), Count of Reuss-Lobenstein
- Henry V (18 May 1650 – 30 December 1672)
- Henry VI (20 March 1651 – 3 August 1651)
- Henry VIII (20 May 1652 – 29 October 1711), Count of Reuss-Hirschberg
- Magdalena Dorothea (29 August 1653 – 11 March 1705)
- Heinrike Juliana (30 November 1654 – 13 June 1728) married on 27 October 1686 to Count John Albert of Biberstein and Ronov
- Ernestine Sophia (1656-1656)
- Amalia Christina (15 September 1657 – 18 February 1660)
- Henry IX (18 October 1659 – 18 February 1660)
- Eleanor (7 September 1661 – 18 August 1696)
- Sibylle Friederike (7 September 1661 – 11 December 1728)
- Henry X (29 November 1662 – 10 June 1711), Count of Reuss-Ebersdorf
