= Vohburg =

Vohburg a.d.Donau
- Town
- Coat of arms

- Location of Vohburg a.d.Donau within Pfaffenhofen an der Ilm district
- Interactive map of Vohburg a.d.Donau
- Location within Germany Location within Bavaria
- Coordinates: 48°46′N 11°37′E
- Country: Germany
- State: Bavaria
- Admin. region: Oberbayern
- District: Pfaffenhofen an der Ilm
- Subdivisions: 12 Ortsteile

Government
  - Mayor (2020–26): Martin Schmid

Area
  - Total: 45.17 km^{2} (17.44 sq mi)
- Elevation: 371 m (1,217 ft)

Population (2025-12-31)
  - Total: 8,828
  - Density: 195.4/km^{2} (506.2/sq mi)
- Time zone: UTC+01:00 (CET)
  - Summer (DST): UTC+02:00 (CEST)
- Postal codes: 85088
- Dialling codes: 08457
- Vehicle registration: PAF
- Website: www.vohburg.de

Vohburg an der Donau (German pronunciation: [ˈfoːbʊʁk ʔan deːɐ̯ ˈdoːnaʊ], lit. 'Vohburg on the Danube'; Central Bavarian: Vohbuag an da Doana) is a town in the district of Pfaffenhofen, in Bavaria, Germany. It is situated on the right bank of the Danube, 14 km east of Ingolstadt.

== Famous persons ==
- Bertha of Vohburg
- Diepold III of Vohburg
