= Burgk =

- Ortsteil of Schleiz
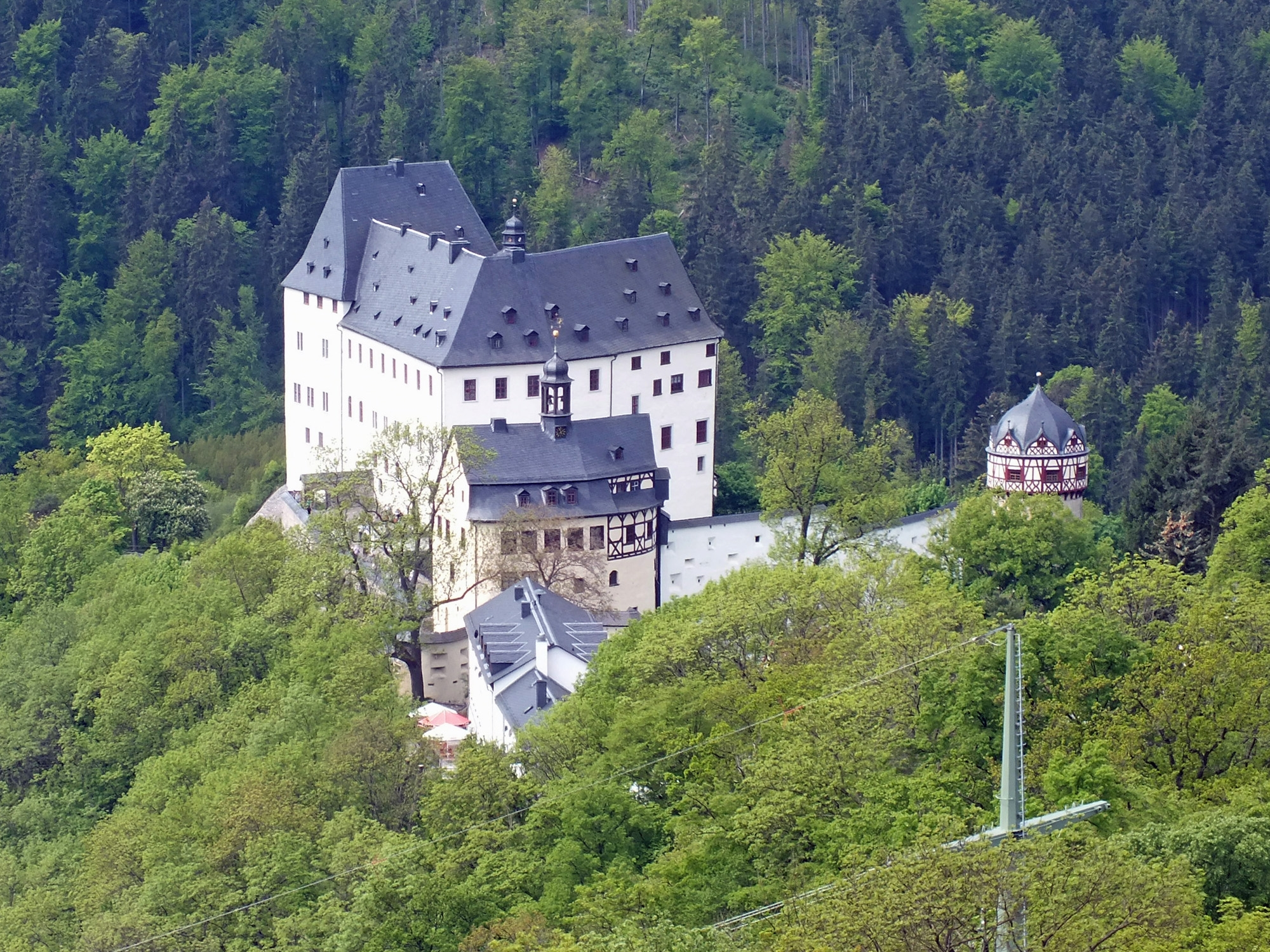
- Burgk Castle
- Interactive map of Burgk
- Location within Germany Location within Thuringia
- Coordinates: 50°33′20″N 11°43′05″E
- Country: Germany
- State: Thuringia
- District: Saale-Orla-Kreis
- Town: Schleiz

Area
  - Total: 13.65 km^{2} (5.27 sq mi)
- Elevation: 420 m (1,380 ft)

Population (2018-12-31)
  - Total: 82
  - Density: 6.0/km^{2} (16/sq mi)
- Time zone: UTC+01:00 (CET)
  - Summer (DST): UTC+02:00 (CEST)
- Postal codes: 07907
- Dialling codes: 03663
- Vehicle registration: SOK

Burgk (German pronunciation: [bʊʁk]) is a village and a former municipality in the district Saale-Orla-Kreis, in Thuringia, Germany. Since December 2019, it is part of the town Schleiz. The well preserved medieval Burgk Castle is situated near the village.
