= Selbitz =

- Town
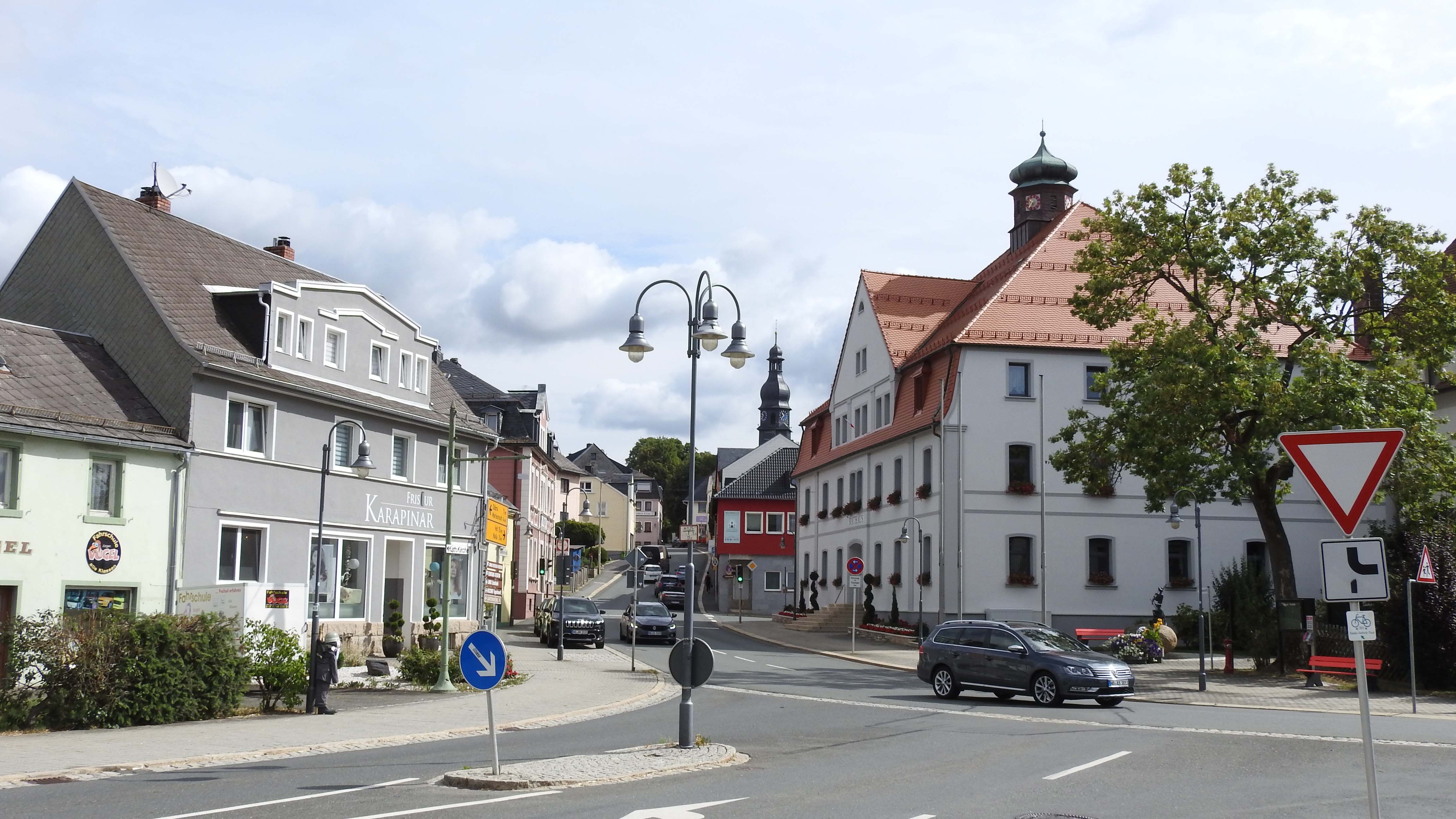
- Center of Selbitz, town hall to the right

- Coat of arms

- Location of Selbitz within Hof district
- Interactive map of Selbitz
- Location within Germany Location within Bavaria
- Coordinates: 50°19′N 11°45′E
- Country: Germany
- State: Bavaria
- Admin. region: Oberfranken
- District: Hof

Government
  - Mayor (2020–26): Stefan Busch

Area
  - Total: 27.74 km^{2} (10.71 sq mi)
- Elevation: 505–640 m (1,657–2,100 ft)

Population (2025-12-31)
  - Total: 4,131
  - Density: 148.9/km^{2} (385.7/sq mi)
- Time zone: UTC+01:00 (CET)
  - Summer (DST): UTC+02:00 (CEST)
- Postal codes: 95152
- Dialling codes: 09280
- Vehicle registration: HO
- Website: www.selbitz.de

Selbitz (German pronunciation: [ˈzɛlbɪts]) is a town in the district of Hof, in Bavaria, Germany. It is situated 12 km west of Hof.

== Sport ==
The town's association football club SpVgg Selbitz greatest success came in 2012 when it qualified for the new northern division of the expanded Bayernliga, the fifth tier of the German football league system, where it played for two seasons until 2014.
