= Knobelsdorff =

Knobelsdorff is a surname. Notable people with the surname include:

- Alexander von Knobelsdorff (1723–1799), Prussian general of the War of the First Coalition
- Elisabeth von Knobelsdorff (1877–1959), German engineer and architect
- Georg Wenzeslaus von Knobelsdorff (1699–1753), Prussian painter and architect
- Konstantin Schmidt von Knobelsdorf (1860–1936), German general and chief-of-staff of World War I
- Otto von Knobelsdorff (1886–1966), German panzer general of World War II
- Manfred von Knobelsdorff (1892–1965), SS officer
