= List of the burgraves of Meissen =

This is a list of the burgraves of Meissen.

The Burgraviate of Meissen was first mentioned in 1068, when King Henry IV installed a burgrave in the imperial castle (Reichsburg) of Meissen. The burgraves of Meissen were royal officials appointed to document the king's claims to power. They acted as a counterbalance to the margrave and bishop of Meissen and were based at a castle on the site of the Albrechtsburg at Meißen. The lordship of the burgrave included quite a few of the villages in the surrounding area. The Vogtland was not part of the burgraviate, but the two territories had the same lord. The burgraves came from the House of Meinheringer and, from 1426, the House of Plauen. The Burgraviate of Meissen should not be confused with the Bishopric of Meissen and the Margraviate of Meissen.

== List (incomplete) ==
Verifiable burgraves	from	to	Life span	Remarks
Frederick I of Wettin	before 1009	1017	d 1017	Frederick was Count of Eilenburg and was only appointed as Burgrave of Meissen at very short notice and only in emergencies in the years 1009 and 1015 (22 October to 19 November).
Burchard		1076	d 1076	Murdered
Burchard II	1114	1117		
Henry Haupt (Caput)	1116			Exchanged by Henry V for Wiprecht von Groitzsch, Louis of Thuringia and Burchard II.
Hoyer				Recorded 1180
Burgraves from the Meinheringer family	from	to	Life span	Remarks
Hermann Sterker von Wohlsbach	1170	1180	b ca. 1143; d ca. 1171	With nephew of the same name, Hermann, Count of Wolfsbach and Schaumberg (b before 1152; d after 1177)
Meinher I of Werben	1199		b before 1171; d 1217/1218	
Meinher II	1214		b 1203; d after 1250	Partly with his brother, Hermann II (I)
Meinher (III)	1243		d after 1297	Son of Meinher II.
Hermann III.			b before 1308; d after 1351	Grandson of Meinher (III)
Meinher IV (V)			b before 1308; d 1352/1355	Grandson of Meinher (III)
Hermann IV			† nach 1349	Son of Hermann III.
Meinher V (VI)			b before 1308; d 1388	Founder of the Hartenstein line
Berthold I	1388	1398	d 1398	Founder of the Frauenstein line
Meinher VI	1398	after 1401	b before 1381; d after 1403	Son of Berthold I.
Henry I of Hartenstein	1388	1423	* vor 1381; d 1423	Son of Meinher V (VI)
Henry II	1423	1426	†† ⚔ 1426	Last Meinheringer, son of Henry I.
Burgraves from the Plauen family	from	to	Life span	Remarks
Henry I of Plauen	1426 (1439)	1446	b 1387; d 1446/1447	Originally Henry X of Plauen
Henry II of Plauen	1446/1447	1482	b 1417; d 1482/1484	In 1466 the lordship of the Plauens over the Ämter of Plauen and Voigtsberg ended with the expulsion of Henry II. It was given to the Saxon elector, Ernest as a Bohemian enfeoffment.
Henry III of Plauen	1482	1519	b 1453; d 1519	In 1482 Henry III finally renounced his claims in favour of the House of Wettin, but still retained the right for himself and his descendants to bear the title of Burgrave of Meissen, which conferred on him a voice at the Imperial Diet. This was confirmed to him by Emperor Frederick III in a 1490 document.
Henry IV of Plauen	1519	1554	b 1510; d 1554	
Henry V of Plauen	1554	1568	b 1533; d 1568	
Henry VI of Plauen	1554	1572	b 1536; d 1572	

With the extinction of the Older Line of the advocates (Vögte) of Plauen in 1572 the family line of the burgraves of Meißen ended. After the Plauens had never reigned as burgraves, the title now went to the prince-electors of Saxony.

== Coat of arms ==
The coat of arms of the burgraves had a black saltire on a gold field. On the helmet is a gold rectangular shield board (Schirmbrett), on which is a cross, which is adorned at the corners with 5 peacock feathers. The mantle is gold and black. This coat of arms was also carried by the burgraves of Merseburg, Naumburg (Saale), Neuenburg near Freyburg (Unstrut) and Osterfeld.

== Literature ==
- J.C.Hasche: Versuch einer Geschichte derer Burggrafen zu Meissen, oder Diplomatische Annalen derselben, in: Magazin der sächsischen Geschichte, 1784–1791, 6th part, 1789, pages 4 – 23
- Traugott Märcker: Das Burggrafthum Meissen, in: Diplomatisch kritische Beiträge zur Geschichte und dem Staatsrechte von Sachsen, 1 vol., Leipzig, 1842
- Otto Posse: Die Markgrafen von Meissen und das Haus Wettin: bis zu Konrad dem Grossen, Leipzig, 1881
- "Elisabeth von Meißen", in: Bau- und Kunstdenkmäler Sachsens, 1919, S. 273 und Fig. 361
- Helmut Gröger: Tausend Jahre Meißen, Meißen, 1929
- Günter Naumann: Meißner Geschichte in Daten 929-1993, Meißen, 1993
- Hans-Jürgen Pohl: Geschichten und Sagen des Meißner Landes, Parts I to IV, Meißen, 1996 ff
- Hans-Jürgen Pohl: Das Burggrafschloss zu Meissen - Bauwerke des Burggrafenhofes einst und heute, Meissen, 2000, ISBN 3-9806962-0-0
- Helga Wäß: "Burggrafschaft Meißen" in: "Form und Wahrnehmung mitteldeutscher Gedächtnisskulptur im 14. Jahrhundert. Ein Beitrag zu mittelalterlichen Grabmonumenten, Epitaphen und Kuriosa in Sachsen, Sachsen-Anhalt, Thüringen, Nord-Hessen, Ost-Westfalen und Südniedersachsen" (Bd. 1), "Katalog ausgewählter Objekte vom Hohen Mittelalter bis zum Anfang des 15. Jahrhunderts" (Bd 2), Bristol u.a. 2006, see Vol. 2: pp. 403–428. - ISBN 3-86504-159-0
