= Pauline Therese of Württemberg =

Queen of Württemberg from 1820 to 1864

Pauline Therese
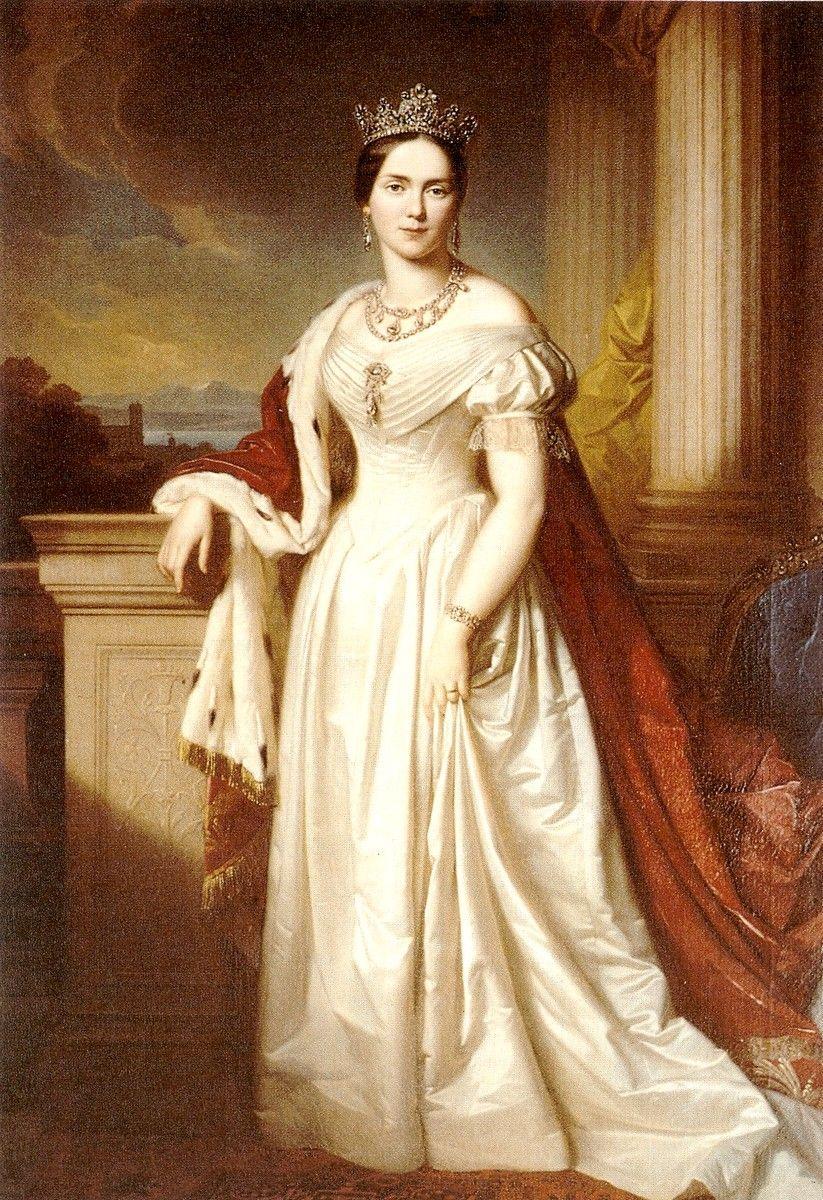
- Portrait by Georg Friedrich Erhardt, 1828

Queen consort of Württemberg
- Tenure: 15 April 1820 – 25 June 1864
- Born: 4 September 1800; Riga
- Died: 10 March 1873 (aged 72); Stuttgart
- Burial: 14 March 1873; Schlosskirche, Ludwigsburg, Germany
- Spouse: William I of Württemberg (m. 1820; died 1864)
- Issue: Princess Catherine of Württemberg; Charles I of Württemberg; Augusta, Princess of Saxe-Weimar-Eisenach
Names
- Pauline Therese Luise
- House: Württemberg
- Father: Duke Louis of Württemberg
- Mother: Princess Henriette of Nassau-Weilburg

Pauline of Württemberg (4 September 1800 – 10 March 1873) was Queen of Württemberg by marriage to her first cousin King William I of Württemberg.

== Early life ==
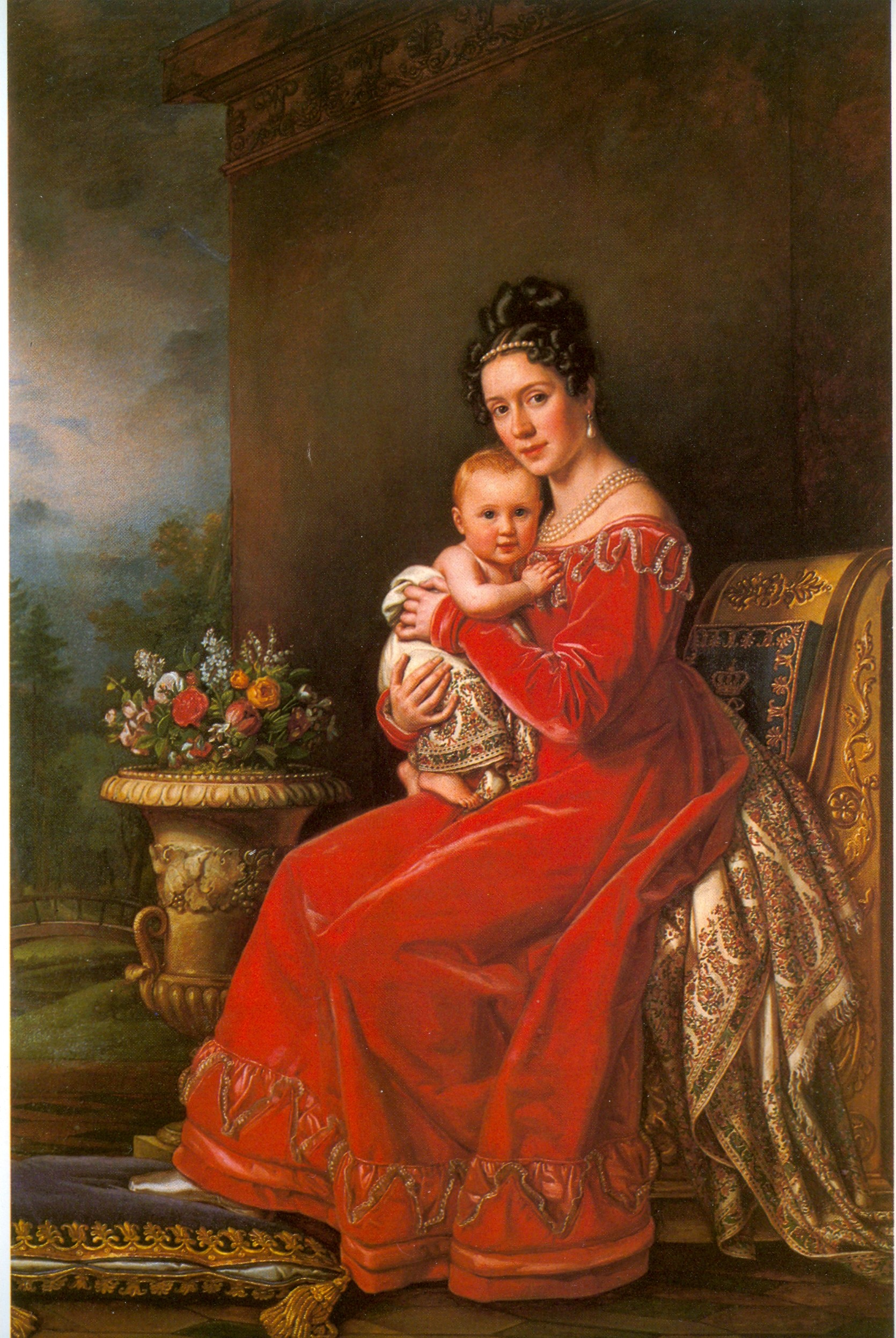
Pauline with her son, 1825

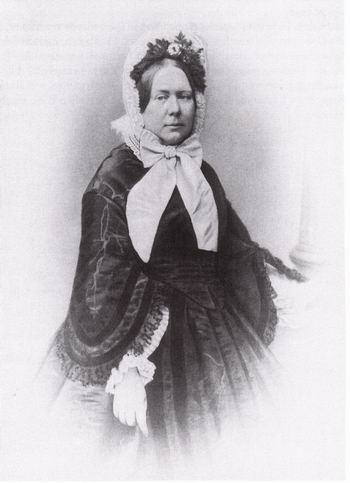
Queen Pauline of Württemberg, 1860s

Pauline Therese was born in Riga, one of the five children of Duke Louis of Württemberg and his wife, Princess Henriette of Nassau-Weilburg. Her siblings included Maria Dorothea, Archduchess of Austria; Amelia, Duchess of Saxe-Hildburghausen; Elisabeth Alexandrine, Princess of Baden, and Duke Alexander of Württemberg himself the founder of the Teck branch of the family.

Her paternal grandparents were Frederick II Eugene, Duke of Württemberg, and Friederike Dorothea of Brandenburg-Schwedt. Her maternal grandparents were Charles Christian, Prince of Nassau-Weilburg, and Princess Carolina of Orange-Nassau, a daughter of William IV, Prince of Orange.

She was tutored by her governess, the known memoirist Alexandrine des Écherolles, who described her pupils in her memoirs.

== Queen ==
On 15 April 1820 in Stuttgart, Pauline Therese married her first cousin King William I of Württemberg. Pauline thus became Queen consort of Württemberg. As his third wife, their marriage was unhappy, particularly because of the deep attachment William showed to his mistress, the actress Amalia Stubenrauch.

Nevertheless, they had three children including the future King Charles I.

Pauline also served as a stepmother to Marie and Sophie, future Queen Consort of the Netherlands; they were William's daughters from his second marriage to Grand Duchess Catherine Pavlovna of Russia. In a letter written to her friend Lady Malet, Queen Sophie would later write of the possibility of how her stepmother Queen Pauline and one of her daughters (Catherine or Augusta) would soon be taking refuge in the Netherlands, as a consequence of the events following the Revolutions of 1848 in the German states.

== Queen dowager ==
William I died at Schloss Rosenstein in Stuttgart on 25 June 1864. Upon his death, their alienation became known to the public; Pauline was completely excluded from her inheritance in his will. She died at Stuttgart, nine years later, on 10 March 1873, having lived her last years in Switzerland. Pauline had been very popular, not only for the kindness she showed to her subjects but also for the devotion she showed to the poor. Upon her death, Württemberg inhabitants gave her name to many roads and places in Stuttgart, Esslingen, and Friolzheim.

== Issue ==
- Catherine (24 August 1821 – 6 December 1898); married Prince Frederick of Württemberg and was the mother of William II of Württemberg.
- Charles I of Württemberg (6 March 1823 – 6 October 1891); married Olga Nikolaevna of Russia and had no issue.
- Augusta (4 October 1826 – 3 December 1898); married Prince Hermann of Saxe-Weimar-Eisenach and had issue.

== Ancestry ==
Ancestors of Pauline Therese of Württemberg

8. Charles Alexander, Duke of Württemberg
4. Frederick II Eugene, Duke of Württemberg
9. Princess Marie Auguste of Thurn and Taxis
2. Duke Louis of Württemberg
10. Frederick William, Margrave of Brandenburg-Schwedt
5. Princess Friederike of Brandenburg-Schwedt
11. Princess Sophia Dorothea of Prussia
1. Pauline Therese of Württemberg
12. Charles August, Prince of Nassau-Weilburg
6. Charles Christian, Prince of Nassau-Weilburg
13. Princess Auguste Friederike of Nassau-Idstein
3. Princess Henriette of Nassau-Weilburg
14. William IV, Prince of Orange
7. Princess Carolina of Orange-Nassau
15. Anne, Princess Royal

== Sources ==
- The New International Encyclopedia. Daniel Coit Gilman, Harry Thurston Peck, and Frank Moore Colby (eds). New York: Dodd, Mead, and Company. 1909.
- Sophie of Württemberg. A Stranger in The Hague: The Letters of Queen Sophie of the Netherlands to Lady Malet, 1842-1877. S.W. Jackson and Hella Haasse (eds.). Duke University Press. 1989.

Pauline Therese of Württemberg House of Württemberg Born: 4 September 1800 Died: 10 March 1873
German royalty
Preceded by Catherine Pavlovna of Russia	Queen consort of Württemberg; 1820–1864	Succeeded by Olga Nikolaevna of Russia
