= Lordship of Homole =

Coordinates: 50.4014°N 16.3475°E

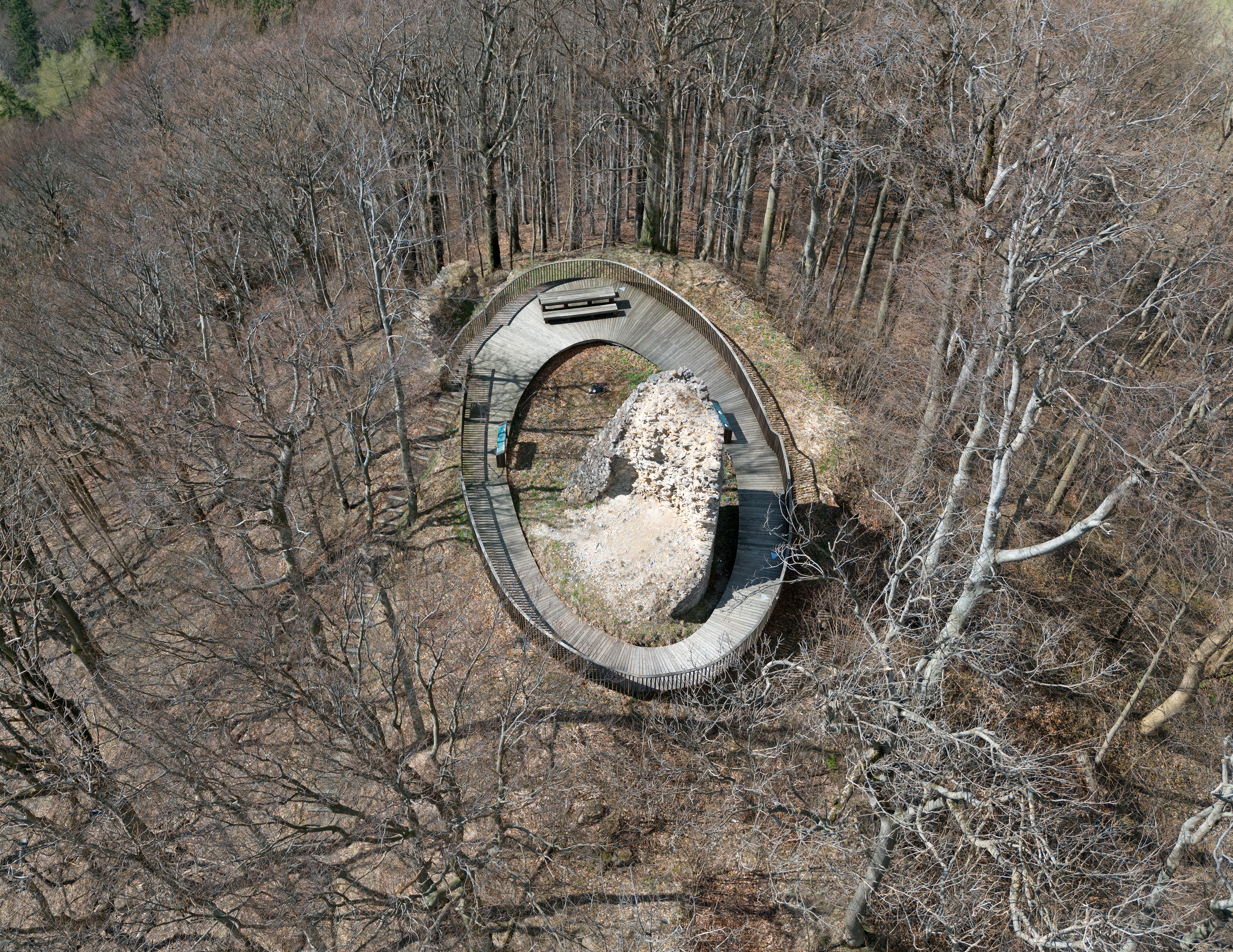
Ruins of Homole Castle

The Lordship of Homole (Polish: Homole, German: Hummel) is a historic landscape zone in the western part of Kłodzko Land in Poland, formerly part of the County of Kladsko, Bohemia.

== Homole Castle ==
The focus of the Lordship of Homole was (the no-longer existing) Homole Castle, located on a mountain above the valley of the Bystrzyca Dusznicka river, approximately 3 km west of Duszniki Zdrój (Czech: Dušníky, German: Bad Reinerz). Due to its geographical location, it secured the important road from Prague via the Homole Pass to Kłodzko (Kladsko, Glatz) and Wrocław (Vratislav, Breslau), the so-called Poland Route. Homole Castle was called in German: Landfried until the 15th century. In 1427, it was conquered by the Hussites, who used it as a base for their attacks on Kłodzko Land and neighbouring Silesia. During this period, the German name Landfried was replaced by the Czech name Homole. After 1560 the castle was uninhabited and dilapidated. Elector Palatine Otto Henry, Elector Palatine had sketches of the castle made during his journey from Neuburg an der Donau to Kraków in 1536. These sketches are the only surviving pictures of the castle before its destruction.

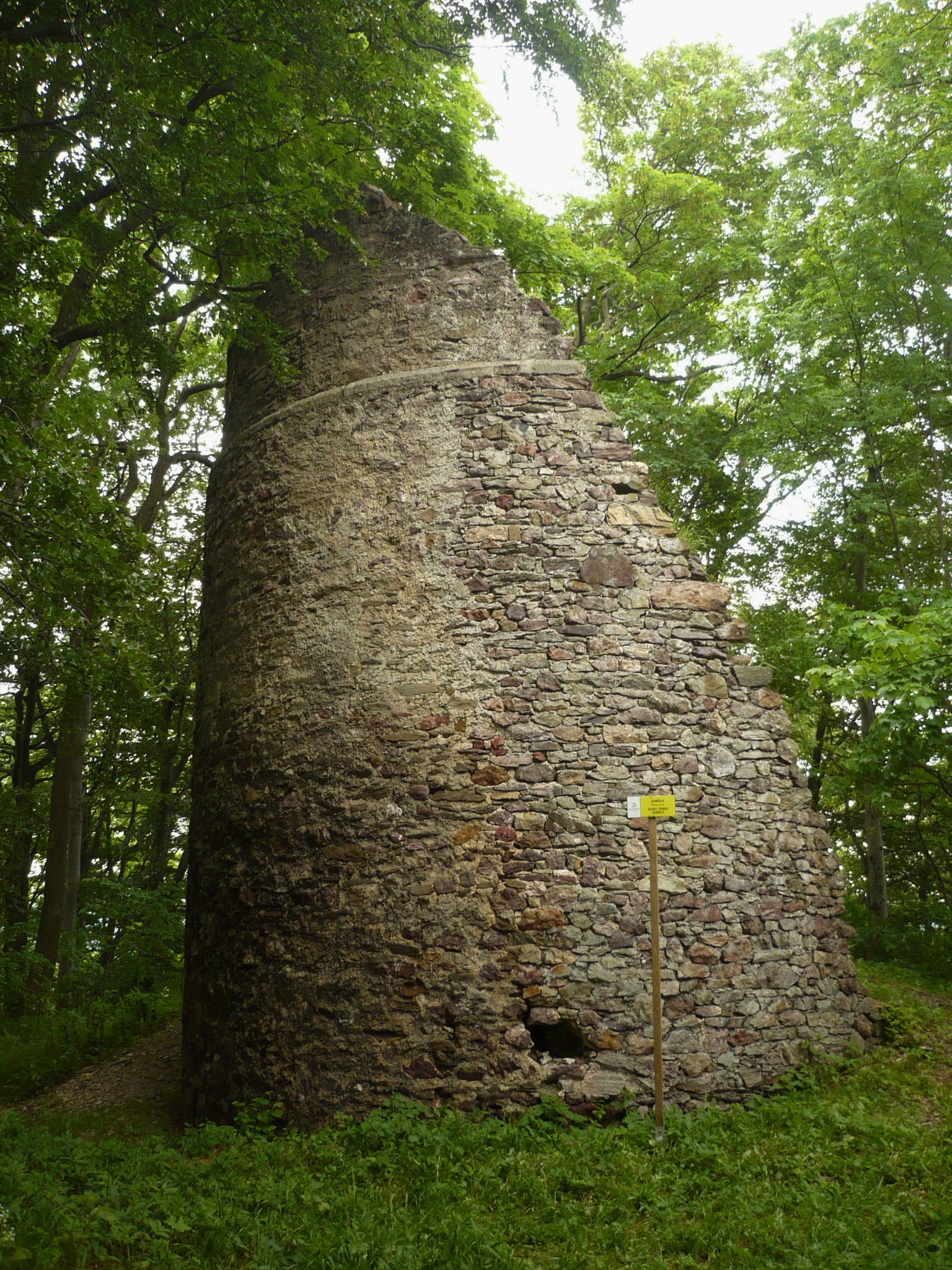
Castle tower ruins

== History of the Lordship of Homole ==
In the 10th century, Homole was part of the territory of the Slavník dynasty. In 995, it was acquired by the Přemyslid dynasty. Back then, the Lordship of Homole consisted only of the eastern part of the later Homole district, that is, the watershed of the Bystrzyca Dusznicka river, with the town of Duszniki Zdrój and a number of villages (present-day Słoszów, Ocieszów, Bystra, Łężyce, Szczytna, Kulin Kłodzki and Dolina).

In the 14th century, the Lordship was held by the Lords of Pannwitz. After the transfer to Dětřich of Janovice (1392–1411), Homole was united with the neighbouring Lordship of Náchod. In 1412, the lordships came into the possession of Henry of Lažany, who traded Homole and Náchod in 1414 with Boček II of Poděbrady (d. 1417) for the city and lordship of Bechyně in southern Bohemia. Boček's son Victor, who was a staunch supporter of the Utraquists, died in 1427. The Taborites then conquered Homole Castle, and used it as a base for their incursions into Kladsko and Silesia. The Lordship of Homole was ruled jointly by the Taborite captains Jan Holý and Mikuláš Trčka z Lípy. In 1440, the castle came into the hands of the Taborite robber baron Jan Kolda of Žampach. From 1444 to 1454, the Lordship belonged to Hynek Krušina of Lichtenburg, who was also the lien holder of the County of Kladsko. After his death, the Lordship was acquired by George of Poděbrady (later King of Bohemia), who appointed Václav Holý as Burgrave of Homole Castle. In 1458, George transferred the Lordship to his sons Boček IV (d. 1496) and Victor. After George's deaths in 1471, his sons divided the family possessions, with Henry the Elder receiving the Lordships of Homole and Náchod.

In 1477, Henry the Elder enfeoffed the Lordship to Hildebrand of Kauffung and made it administratively part of Kladsko, which had been made a County in 1459. At the same time the Bohemian parishes Lewin Kłodzki (Levín) and Czermna (Čermná, Tscherbeney) were incorporated into the Lordship of Homole. The villages of Słone and Brzesowie, that did not belong to the parish of Czermna, but to the parish of St. Lawrence in Náchod, were also incorporated into the Lordship. From this time onwards, the original, eastern part of Homole was termed the "German" side and the western part was termed the "Bohemian" side. After the devastations of the Hussite Wars, the villages of the Bohemian side were also settled anew by German-speakers, making the whole Lordship in majority German-speaking

Under Sigismund of Kauffung, the castle again became a hideout for robber barons. In 1501, Ulrich of Hardegg bought the County of Kladsko, including the Lordship of Homole. In 1537, his son pledged it to Jan IV of Pernštejn, whose son Vratislav II of Pernštejn inherited the Lordship in 1548. In 1459, the County of Kladsko, including the Lordship of Homole, was sold to Ernest of Bavaria of the House of Wittelsbach. On 10 December 1459, Ernest gave the Lordship of Homole to his illegitimate son Eustace. In 1550, Eustace was ennobled by Emperor Charles V as Eustace of Landfried. Eustace was legitimized as a noble son of Ernest by Pope Julius II. Eustace sold the Lordship after Ernest's death to Ernst Gelhorn von und zu Alten Greckau und Roge. In 1590, the Lordship was acquired by Rudolf of Stubenberg, who pledged it to the city of Reinerz (present-day Duszniki Zdrój) in 1595.

== Dissolution of the Lordship ==
The Lordship was dissolved in 1598. Rudolf of Stubenberg acquired most of the land the belonged to the castle estate. Most of the towns and villages ware assigned to the Bohemian Chamber (Treasure Office for management of royal assets). Several of them were sold to the city of Reinerz and the Lordship of Rückers by Emperor Leopold I in 1684, to defray the cost of the Great Turkish War.
