= Princess Sophie of Baden =

Sophie
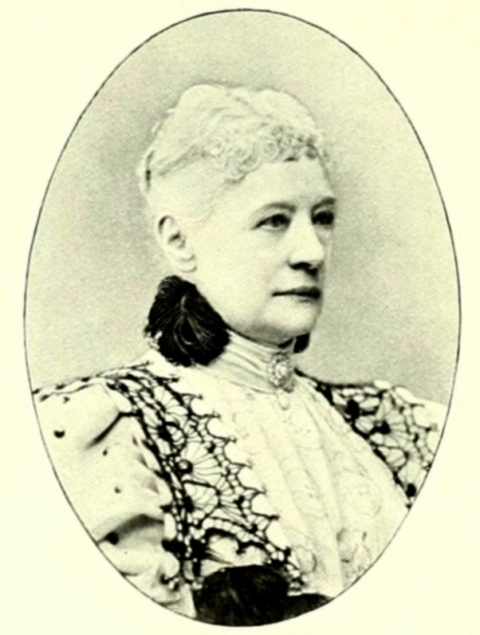

Princess consort of Lippe
- Tenure: 8 December 1875 – 20 March 1895
- Born: 7 August 1834; Karlsruhe
- Died: 6 April 1904 (aged 69); Karlsruhe
- Spouse: Woldemar, Prince of Lippe (m. 1858; died 1895)
Names
- Sophie Pauline Henriette Marie Amelie Luise
- House: Zähringen
- Father: Prince William of Baden
- Mother: Duchess Elisabeth Alexandrine of Württemberg

Princess Sophie of Baden (Sophie Pauline Henriette Marie Amelie Luise; 7 August 1834 in Karlsruhe – 6 April 1904 in Karlsruhe), was a Princess of Baden by birth and the Princess consort of Lippe by marriage.

== Life ==
Sophie was the second daughter of Prince William of Baden (1792–1859) and Duchess Elisabeth Alexandrine of Württemberg (1802–1864), daughter of Duke Louis of Württemberg. Her paternal grandparents were Charles Frederick, the first Grand Duke of Baden, and his second wife, Louise Caroline Geyer von Geyersberg, Countess of Hochberg. She grew up in Karlsruhe, together with her two younger sisters, Elizabeth (1835–1891) and Leopoldine (1837–1903).

== Marriage ==
Sophie was married to Woldemar, Prince of Lippe (1824–1895) second son of Leopold II, Prince of Lippe (1796–1851) and Princess Emilie of Schwarzburg-Sondershausen (1800–1867) on 9 November 1858 in Karlsruhe. The marriage was childless, leading to a dispute that lasted two decades between the two lines of the House of Lippe to inherit the principality after the death of Woldemar, in 1895.

== Ancestry ==
Ancestors of Princess Sophie of Baden

8. Frederick, Hereditary Prince of Baden-Durlach
4. Charles Frederick, Grand Duke of Baden
9. Princess Amalia of Nassau-Dietz
2. Prince William of Baden
10. Ludwig Heinrich, Baron Geyer von Geyersberg
5. Baroness Louise Caroline Geyer of Geyersberg
11. Countess Maximiliana Christiane von Sponeck
1. Princess Sophie of Baden
12. Frederick II Eugene, Duke of Württemberg
6. Duke Louis of Württemberg
13. Margravine Friederike of Brandenburg-Schwedt
3. Duchess Elisabeth Alexandrine of Württemberg
14. Charles Christian, Prince of Nassau-Weilburg
7. Princess Henriette of Nassau-Weilburg
15. Princess Carolina of Orange-Nassau

== Notes and references ==
Princess Sophie of Baden House of Baden Born: 7 August 1834 Died: 6 April 1904
Regnal titles
Preceded by Princess Elisabeth of Schwarzburg-Rudolstadt	Princess consort of Lippe; 8 December 1875 – 6 April 1904	Succeeded by Princess Bertha of Hesse-Philippsthal-Barchfeld
