= Hynek Boček of Poděbrady =

Bohemian-Moravian nobleman (d. 1426)

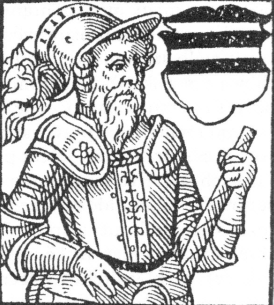
- Hynek Boček of Poděbrady
- Died: 16 October 1426
- Noble family: Poděbrady
- Father: Boček II of Poděbrady
- Mother: Anna Elisabeth of Lipá

Hynek Boček of Poděbrady (also known as: Hynek of Poděbrady or Hynek Boček of Kunštát and Poděbrady; Czech: Hynek Boček z Poděbrad or Hynek Poděbradský; died 16 October 1426 in Nymburk) was a Bohemian-Moravian nobleman and follower of the Hussites.

== Life ==
Hynek was a member of the Poděbrady family. His parents were Boček II of Poděbrady and Anna Elisabeth of Lipá (Anna Eliška z Lipé), a daughter of Henry of Lipá (Jindřich z Lipé). He often used his middle name Boček in addition to Hynek, as this name had a rich tradition with his ancestors.

Hynek was first documented in 1417 in connection with the legacy of his late father, who died that year. Hynek was the youngest among his brothers and inherited the Poděbrady headquarters with the associated Lordship. Jan, the eldest brother died between 1407 and 1409, during the lifetime of their father. The third-born son Boček III inherited together with the fourth-born Victor the Moravian estates, while Victor additionally received the Bohemian estates Náchod, Hummel and Litice Castle.

During the Hussite Wars, Hynek initially fought with the eastern Bohemian Orebites; he was their captain. During the collision with the moderate Hussites in Prague, he was taken prisoner by them. However, a year later, he entered in their service. In 1423 he participated with his brother Victor in a campaign in Moravia. In 1425 he arrested Jan Puška of Kunštát, the marshal of Nymburk at Mydlovar Castle and kept him prisoner at his own Poděbrady Castle. The reason for the arrest was probably a long-standing land dispute between the Poděbrady and the Lišice branches of the Kunštát family. After Jan Puška died in his prison, Hynek appropriate his Mydlovar Castle and the associated Lordship of Kostomlaty, and added it to his Poděbrady possessions. In 1426, he participated in the Battle of Aussig. When the Taborites besieged Poděbrady, he fled to Nymburk, where he died on 16 October 1426 of a gunshot wound. He was not married and left no descendants.
