= Náměšť =

Náměšť may refer to:

- Náměšť nad Oslavou, a town in Třebíč District, Vysočina Region, Czech Republic
- Náměšť na Hané, a market town in Olomouc District, Olomouc Region, Czech Republic
