= Boček III of Poděbrady =

- Born: before 1395
- Died: probably 1429
- Noble family: House of Poděbrady
- Father: Boček II of Poděbrady
- Mother: Anna Elisabeth of Leipa

Boček III of Poděbrady (also: Boček III of Kunštát and Poděbrady, German: Boček III. von Podiebrad, Czech: Boček III. z Poděbrad or Boček III. z Kunštátu a Poděbrad or Boček mladší z Poděbrad; died: 1429) was a Bohemian-Moravian nobleman and supporter of the Hussites.

== Life ==
Boček III was a member of the noble Poděbrady family. His parents were Boček II of Poděbrady and Anna Elisabeth of Leipa (Czech: Anna Eliška z Lipé), a daughter of Henry of Leipa (Czech: Jindřich z Lipé). In some sources he is referred to as Boček the Younger, to distinguish him from his father, who is then called Boček the Elder.

Boček III is first mentioned in a document from 1395. He and his father are named together several times, until his father's death in 1417. Boček then inherited the Moravian estates jointly with his younger brother Victor. Victor also inherited the Bohemian dominions Litice Castle and Náchod and the Lordship of Hummel, while the youngest brother Hynek Boček received the family seat at Poděbrady. John, the oldest brother, died during his father's lifetime, between 1407 and 1409. Victor and Boček III fought several legal battles about their Moravian possessions against their distant relatives Gerald Puška of Kunštát and Smil of Kunštát at Bludov. In 1417, Boček III successfully besieged Pyšolec Castle; a year later he acquired the Lordship of Vranová Lhota.

After the start of the Hussite Wars, Boček III participated in a meeting at Brno, where the nobles were forced to reject the Four Articles of Prague and to obey King Sigismund of Bohemia. A short time later, however, Boček III joined the Hussites. In 1422, he took part in the Hussite siege of Kroměříž.

Boček III lived most of his life in Moravia. He called himself "Lord of Bouzov, and after 1427, "Lord of Moravská Třebová". He was not married and left no descendants. The year of his death is not certain. It is believed that he outlived his brother Victor, who died in 1427, by one or two years. Victor, in turn, outlived Hynek, who died in 1426.

== References and sources ==
- Ondřej Felcman, Radek Fukala u. a.: Poděbradové. Rod českomoravských pánů, kladských hrabat a sleszkých knížat. Nakladatelství Lidové Noviny 2008, ISBN 978-80-7106-949-2.
