= Duchess Elisabeth Alexandrine of Württemberg =

Duchess Elisabeth Alexandrine
- Princess William of Baden
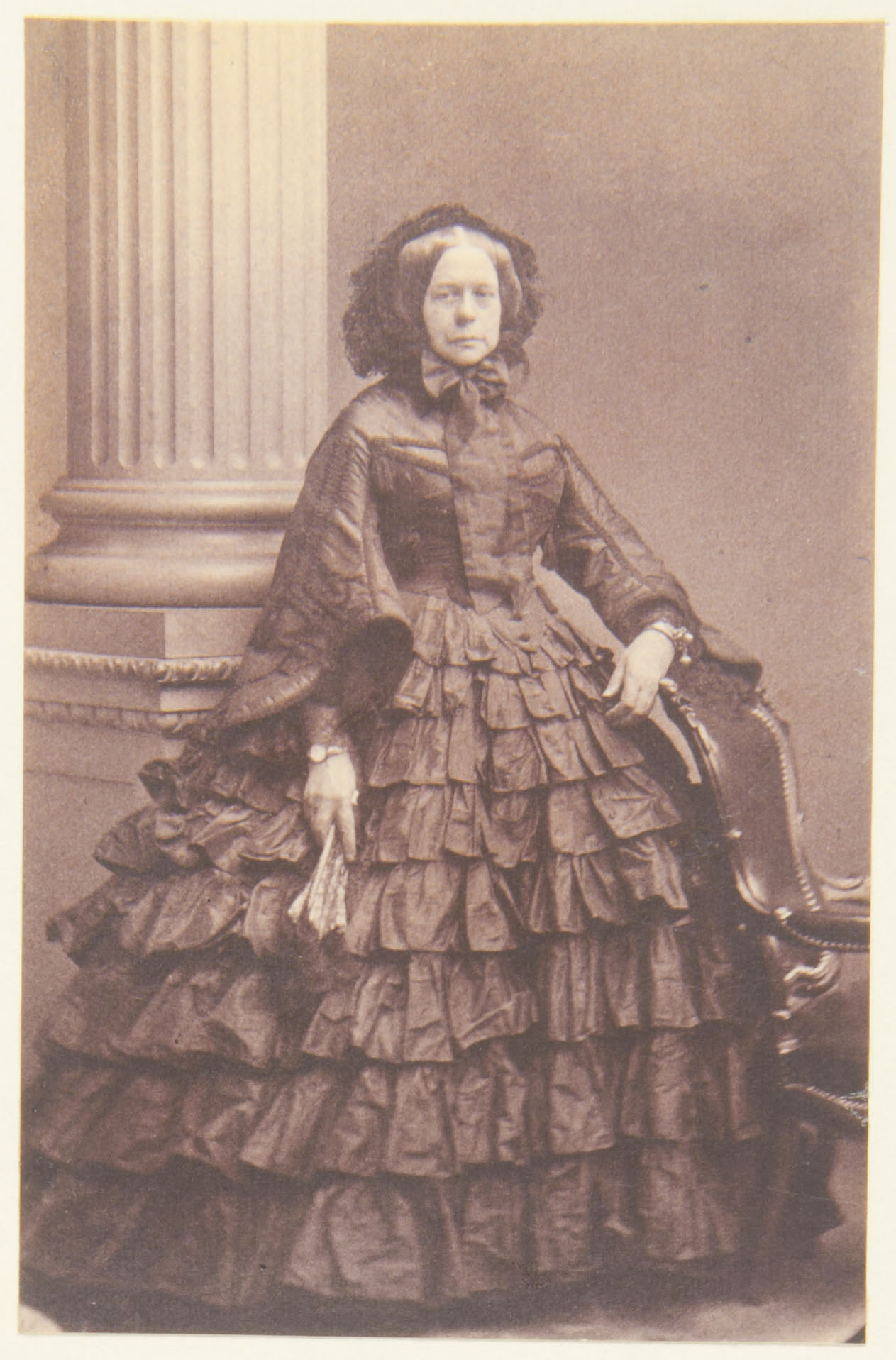
- Duchess Elisabeth in 1860
- Born: 27 February 1802; Würzau
- Died: 5 December 1864 (aged 62); Karlsruhe, Germany
- Spouse: Prince William of Baden (m. 1830; died 1859)
- Issue: Princess Henriette; Sophie, Princess of Lippe; Princess Elisabeth; Leopoldine, Princess of Hohenlohe-Langenburg
Names
- German: Elisabeth Alexandrine Konstanze
- House: Württemberg
- Father: Duke Louis of Württemberg
- Mother: Princess Henriette of Nassau-Weilburg

Duchess Elisabeth Alexandrine Constance of Württemberg (27 February 1802 – 5 December 1864) was a daughter of Duke Louis of Württemberg and Princess Henriette of Nassau-Weilburg.

== Family ==
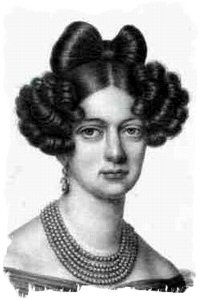
Elisabeth, aged 18.

Elisabeth was one of five children born to Duke Louis of Württemberg and his second wife Princess Henriette of Nassau-Weilburg. Her siblings included Queen Pauline of Württemberg and Duke Alexander of Württemberg, the founder of the Teck branch of the family.

She was tutored by her governess, the known memoirist Alexandrine des Écherolles, who described her pupils in her memoirs.

== Marriage and children ==
Elisabeth married Prince William of Baden on 16 October 1830. Ten years older than she was, he was the second son of Charles Frederick, Grand Duke of Baden and his second wife Luise Karoline Geyer von Geyersberg. Due to the low birth rank of his mother, William had no succession rights for a time to the Grand Duchy of Baden (until his brother succeeded as Leopold I, Grand Duke of Baden earlier that year).

Elisabeth and William had issue:

- Princess Wilhelmine Pauline Henriette Amalie Louise (May 7, 1833 – August 7, 1834).
- Princess Sophie Pauline Henriette Amalie Louise (August 7, 1834 – April 6, 1904), married Woldemar, Prince of Lippe on November 9, 1858.
- Princess Pauline Sophie Elisabeth Marie (December 18, 1835 – May 15, 1891).
- Princess Leopoldine Wilhelmine Pauline Amalie Maximiliane (February 22, 1837 – December 23, 1903), married Hermann VI, Prince of Hohenlohe-Langenburg on September 24, 1862.

== Death ==
William died on 11 October 1859. Elisabeth would die five years later, on 5 December 1864.

== Ancestry ==
Ancestors of Duchess Elisabeth Alexandrine of Württemberg

16. Frederick Charles, Duke of Württemberg-Winnental
8. Charles Alexander, Duke of Württemberg
17. Margravine Eleonore Juliane of Brandenburg-Ansbach
4. Frederick II Eugene, Duke of Württemberg
18. Anselm Franz, 2nd Prince of Thurn and Taxis
9. Princess Marie Auguste of Thurn and Taxis
19. Princess Maria Ludovika Anna Franziska of Lobkowicz
2. Duke Louis of Württemberg
20. Philip William, Margrave of Brandenburg-Schwedt
10. Frederick William, Margrave of Brandenburg-Schwedt
21. Princess Johanna Charlotte of Anhalt-Dessau
5. Margravine Friederike of Brandenburg-Schwedt
22. Frederick William I of Prussia
11. Princess Sophia Dorothea of Prussia
23. Sophia Dorothea of Hanover
1. Duchess Elisabeth Alexandrine of Württemberg
24. John Ernst, Count of Nassau-Weilburg
12. Charles August, Prince of Nassau-Weilburg
25. Maria Polyxena of Leiningen-Dagsburg-Hartenburg
6. Charles Christian, Prince of Nassau-Weilburg
26. George August, Count of Nassau-Idstein
13. Augusta Frederika Wilhelmina of Nassau-Idstein
27. Henriette Dorothea of Oettingen-Oettingen
3. Princess Henriette of Nassau-Weilburg
28. John William Friso, Prince of Orange
14. William IV, Prince of Orange
29. Landgravine Marie Louise of Hesse-Kassel
7. Princess Carolina of Orange-Nassau
30. George II of Great Britain
15. Anne, Princess Royal of Great Britain
31. Caroline of Ansbach
