= Niwa, Lower Silesian Voivodeship =

Niwa
- Village
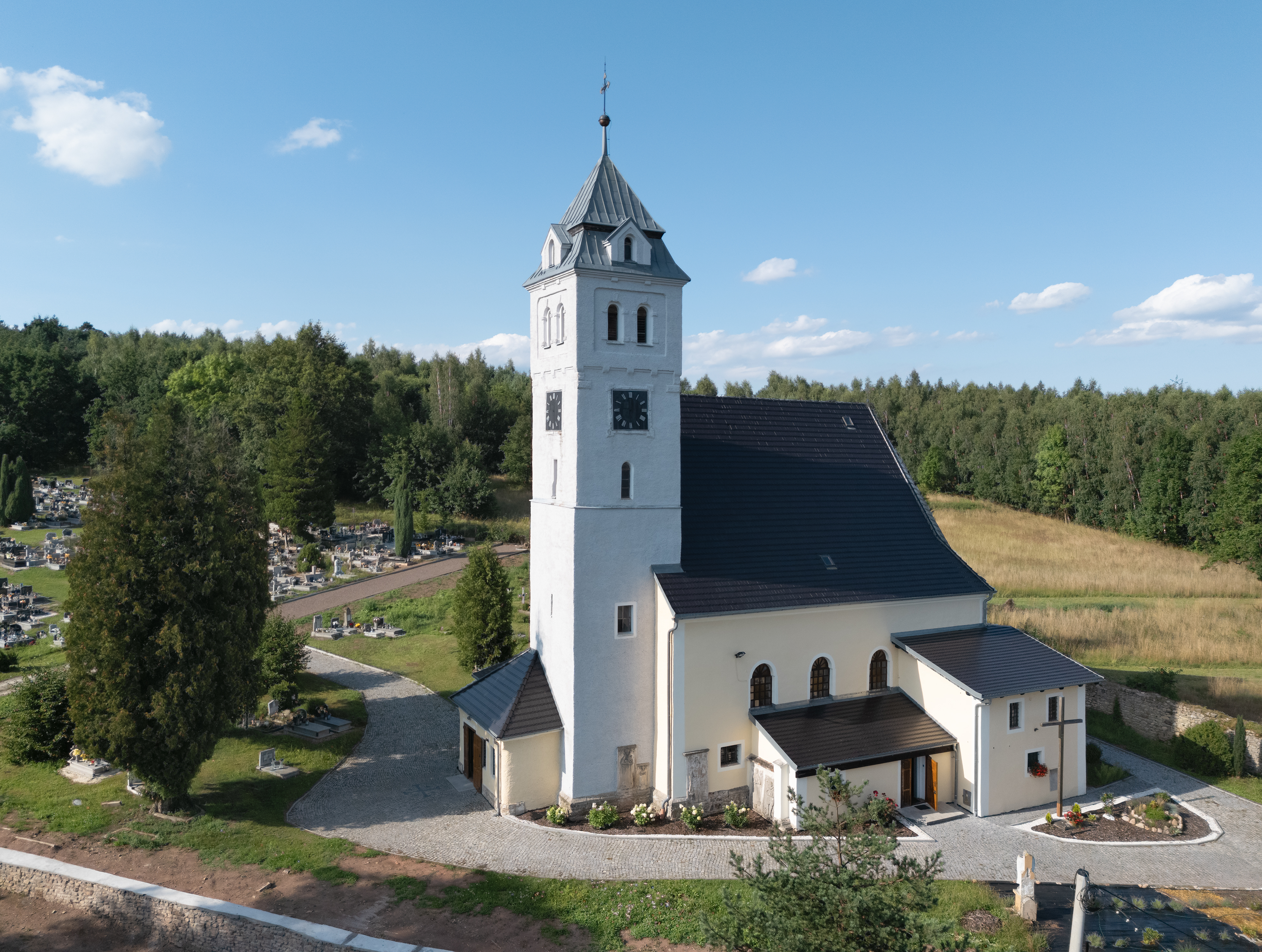

- Location within Poland
- Coordinates: 50°27′10″N 16°30′30″E
- Country: Poland
- Voivodeship: Lower Silesian
- County: Kłodzko
- Gmina: Szczytna

Niwa [ˈɲiva] is a village in the administrative district of Gmina Szczytna, within Kłodzko County, Lower Silesian Voivodeship, in south-western Poland.
