= Chocieszów =

- Village
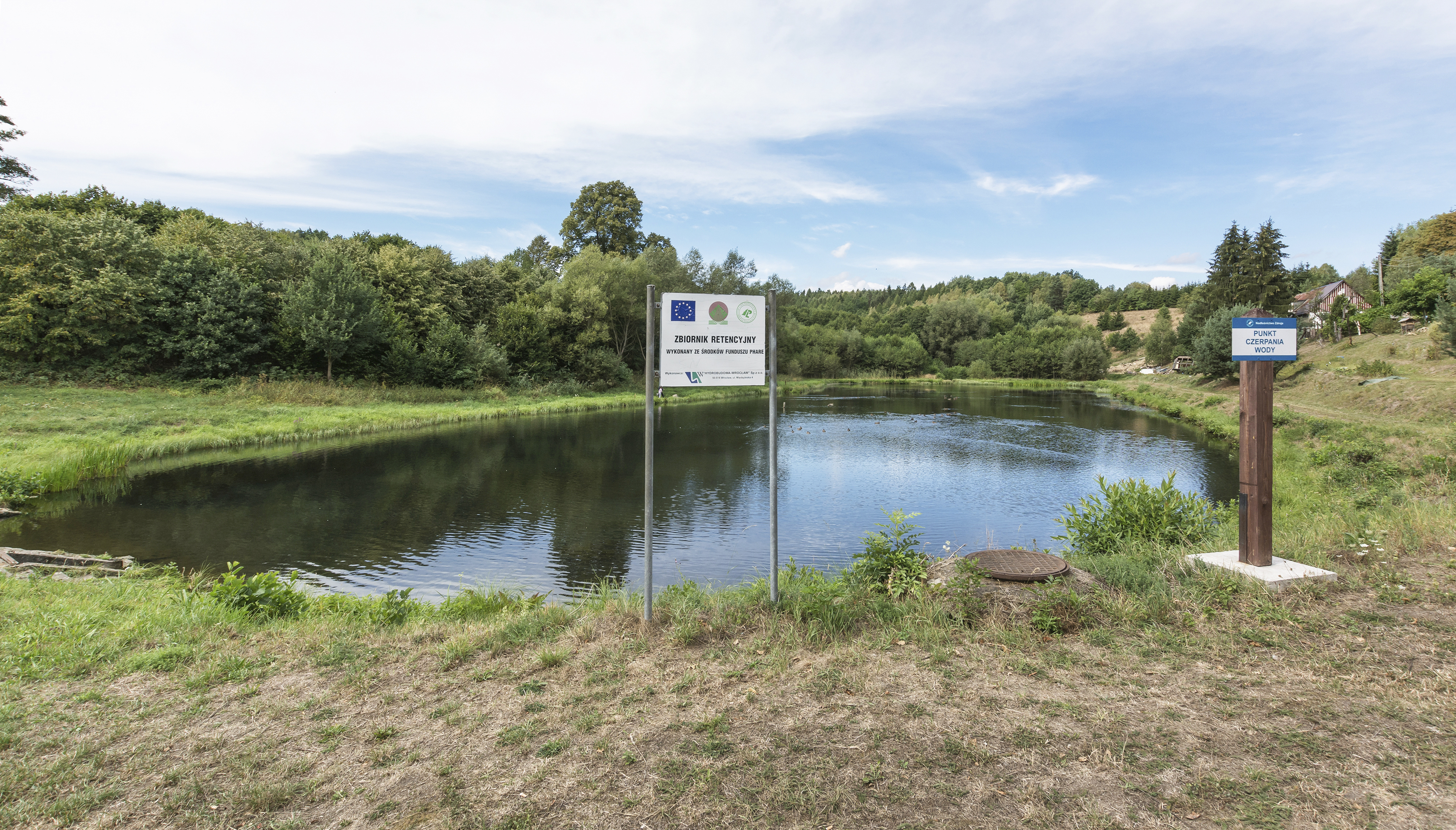

- Location within Poland
- Coordinates: 50°27′14″N 16°29′17″E
- Country: Poland
- Voivodeship: Lower Silesian
- County: Kłodzko
- Gmina: Szczytna

Chocieszów [xɔˈt͡ɕɛʂuf] is a village in the administrative district of Gmina Szczytna, within Kłodzko County, Lower Silesian Voivodeship, in south-western Poland.
