= Gmina Szczytna =

Gmina Szczytna Szczytna Commune
- Gmina
- Coat of arms
- Interactive map of Gmina Szczytna
- Coordinates (Szczytna): 50°25′N 16°26′E
- Country: Poland
- Voivodeship: Lower Silesian
- County: Kłodzko
- Seat: Szczytna
- Sołectwos: Chocieszów, Dolina, Łężyce, Niwa, Słoszów, Wolany, Złotno

Area
  - Total: 133.16 km^{2} (51.41 sq mi)

Population (2019-06-30)
  - Total: 7,276
  - Density: 54.64/km^{2} (141.5/sq mi)
- Website: http://www.szczytna.pl

Gmina Szczytna is an urban-rural gmina (administrative district) in Kłodzko County, Lower Silesian Voivodeship, in south-western Poland. Its seat is the town of Szczytna, which lies approximately 16 kilometres (10 mi) west of Kłodzko, and 90 kilometres (56 mi) south-west of the regional capital Wrocław.

The gmina covers an area of 133.16 square kilometres (51.4 sq mi), and as of 2019 its total population is 7,276.

== Neighbouring gminas ==
Gmina Szczytna is bordered by the towns of Duszniki-Zdrój and Kudowa-Zdrój, and the gminas of Bystrzyca Kłodzka, Kłodzko, Lewin Kłodzki and Radków. It also borders the Czech Republic.

== Villages ==
Apart from the town of Szczytna, the gmina contains the villages of Chocieszów, Dolina, Łężyce, Niwa, Słoszów, Studzienno, Wolany and Złotno.

== Twin towns – sister cities ==
Gmina Szczytna is twinned with:

- Międzychód, Poland
- Náměšť na Hané, Czech Republic
- Tegernheim, Germany
- Velké Poříčí, Czech Republic
