= Studzienno =

Studzienna
- Village
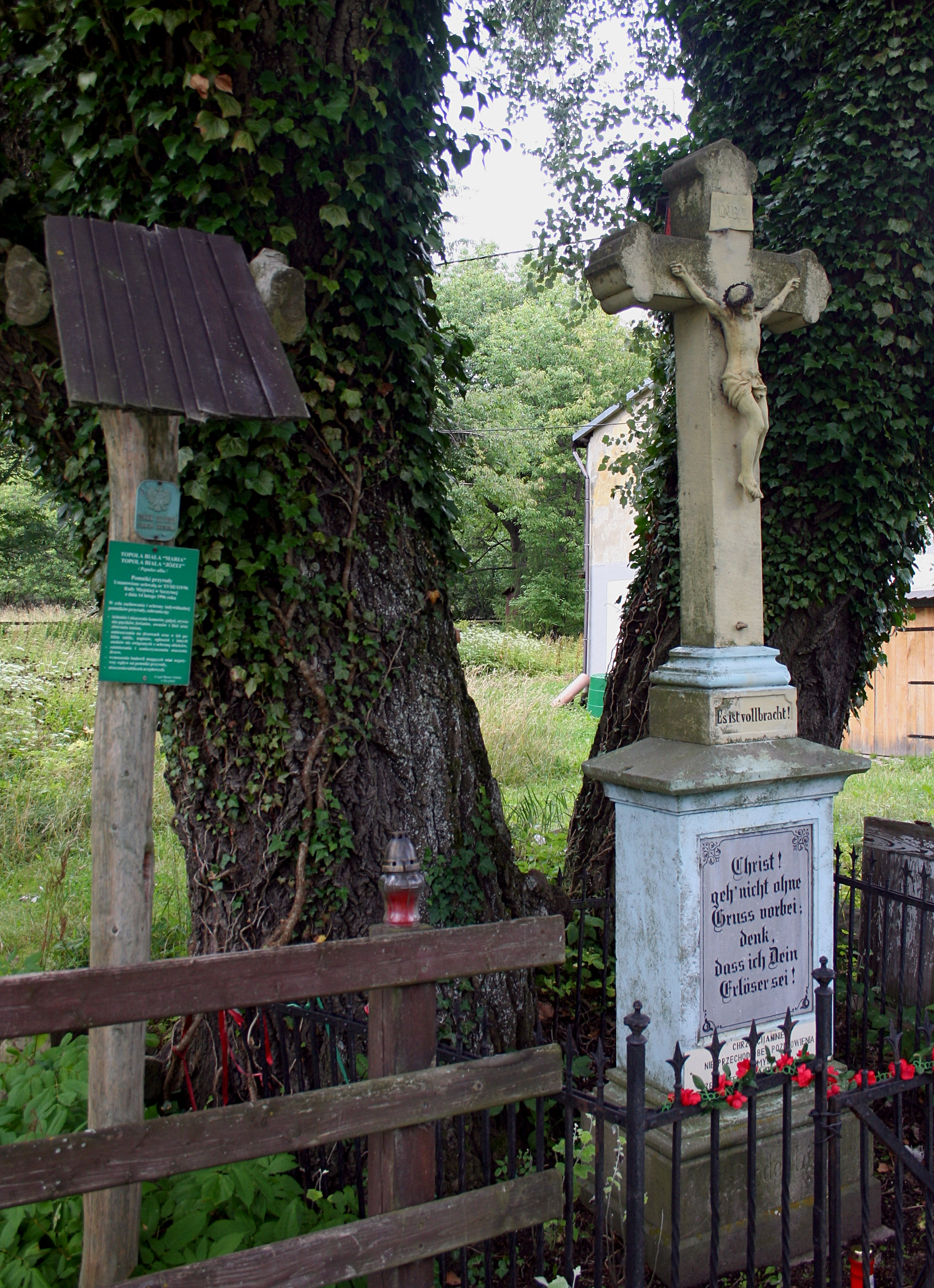

- Location within Poland
- Coordinates: 50°28′N 16°28′E
- Country: Poland
- Voivodeship: Lower Silesian
- County: Kłodzko
- Gmina: Szczytna

Studzienno [stuˈd͡ʑɛnnɔ] is a village in the administrative district of Gmina Szczytna, within Kłodzko County, Lower Silesian Voivodeship, in south-western Poland.
