= Duchess Amelia of Württemberg =

Duchess of Saxe-Altenburg from 1834 to 1848

Amalie of Württemberg
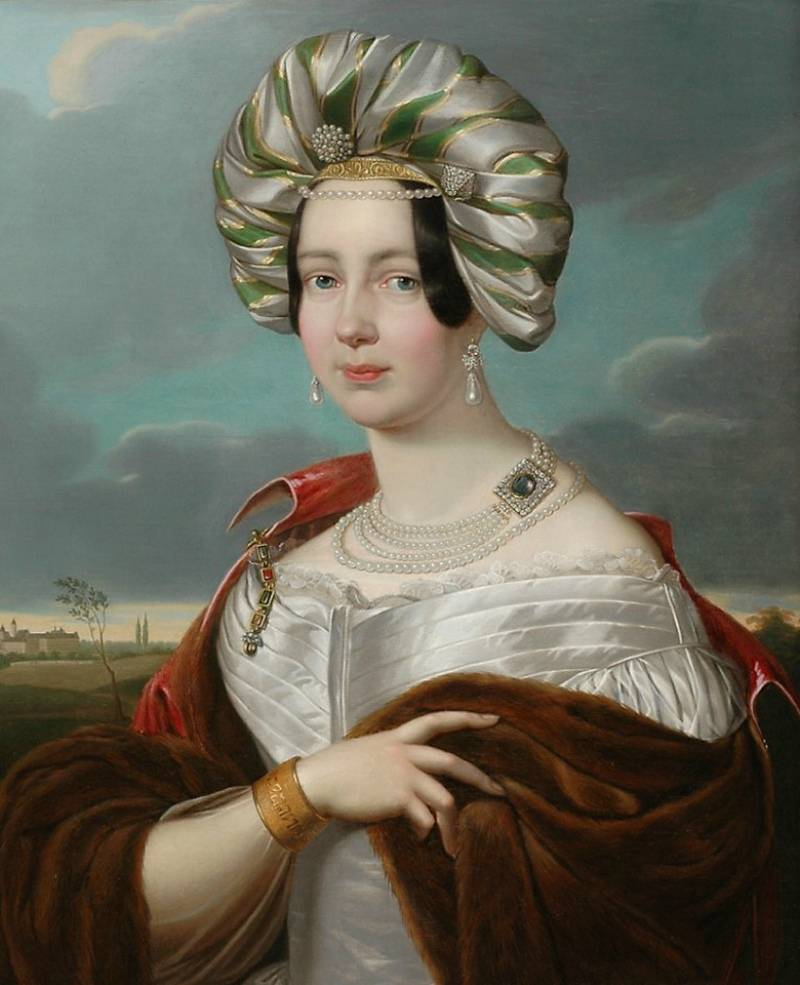

Duchess consort of Saxe-Altenburg
- Tenure: 29 September 1834 – 28 November 1848
- Born: 28 June 1799; Wallisfurth, Kingdom of Prussia (modern Wolany, Lower Silesian Voivodeship, Poland)
- Died: 28 November 1848 (aged 49); Altenburg, Saxe-Altenburg
- Spouse: Joseph I, Duke of Saxe-Altenburg (m. 1817)
- Issue: Marie, Queen of Hanover; Princess Pauline; Princess Therese; Elisabeth, Grand Duchess of Oldenburg; Grand Duchess Alexandra Iosifovna of Russia; Princess Luise
Names
- Amelia Theresa Louise Wilhelmina Philippina; German: Amalie Therese Luise Wilhelmine Philippine
- House: Württemberg
- Father: Duke Louis of Württemberg
- Mother: Princess Henriette of Nassau-Weilburg

Duchess Amelia of Württemberg (German: Amalie Therese Luise Wilhelmine Philippine von Württemberg; 28 June 1799 – 28 November 1848) was Duchess of Saxe-Altenburg by marriage to Joseph, Duke of Saxe-Altenburg.

== Life ==
=== Family and childhood ===
She was a daughter of Duke Louis of Württemberg and Princess Henrietta of Nassau-Weilburg. She was tutored by her governess, the known memoirist Alexandrine des Écherolles, who described her pupils in her memoirs.

=== Marriage and issue ===
She married Joseph, Duke of Saxe-Altenburg, on 24 April 1817, at Kirchheim unter Teck.

Amalie and Joseph had six daughters:

- Princess Alexandrine Marie Wilhelmine Katharine Charlotte Therese Henriette Luise Pauline Elisabeth Friederike Georgine (14 April 1818, Hildburghausen – 9 January 1907, Gmunden); married on 18 February 1843 to King George V of Hanover.
- Princess Pauline Friederike Henriette Auguste (24 November 1819, Kirchheim unter Teck – 11 January 1825, Hildburghausen)
- Princess Henriette Friederike Therese Elisabeth (9 October 1823, Hildburghausen – 3 April 1915, Altenburg)
- Princess Elisabeth Pauline Alexandrine (26 March 1826, Hildburghausen – 2 February 1896, Oldenburg); married on 10 February 1852 to Peter II, Grand Duke of Oldenburg.
- Princess Alexandra Friederike Henriette Pauline Marianne Elisabeth (8 July 1830, Altenburg – 6 July 1911, St. Petersburg); married on 11 September 1848 to Grand Duke Konstantin Nikolayevich of Russia. Upon her marriage, she took the name Alexandra Iosifovna in a Russian Orthodox baptism. Via this marriage, Amalia is an ancestor of Felipe VI of Spain and Charles III of the United Kingdom.
- Princess Luise Pauline Karoline Therese Marie (4 June 1832, Altenburg – 29 August 1833, Hummelshain)

Amalia died on 28 November 1848 at the age of 49 in Altenburg. Her husband decided two days later to abdicate in the favor of his brother George, Duke of Saxe-Altenburg. Joseph died in 1868 at Altenburg.

== Ancestry ==
Ancestors of Duchess Amelia of Württemberg

8. Charles Alexander, Duke of Württemberg
4. Frederick II Eugene, Duke of Württemberg
9. Princess Marie Auguste of Thurn and Taxis
2. Duke Louis of Württemberg
10. Frederick William, Margrave of Brandenburg-Schwedt
5. Princess Friederike of Brandenburg-Schwedt
11. Princess Sophia Dorothea of Prussia
1. Duchess Amelia of Württemberg
12. Charles August, Prince of Nassau-Weilburg
6. Charles Christian, Prince of Nassau-Weilburg
13. Princess Augusta Frederika Wilhelmina of Nassau-Idstein
3. Princess Henriette of Nassau-Weilburg
14. William IV, Prince of Orange
7. Princess Carolina of Orange-Nassau
15. Anne, Princess Royal and Princess of Orange

Duchess Amelia of Württemberg House of Württemberg Born: 28 June 1799 Died: 28 November 1848
German royalty
| Vacant Title last held by Elisabeth Sophie of Saxe-Altenburg | Duchess consort of Saxe-Altenburg; 29 September 1834 – 28 November 1848 | Succeeded by Marie Louise of Mecklenburg-Schwerin |
