= Duchess Maria Dorothea of Württemberg =

Maria Dorothea
- Archduchess of Austria; Palatina of Hungary
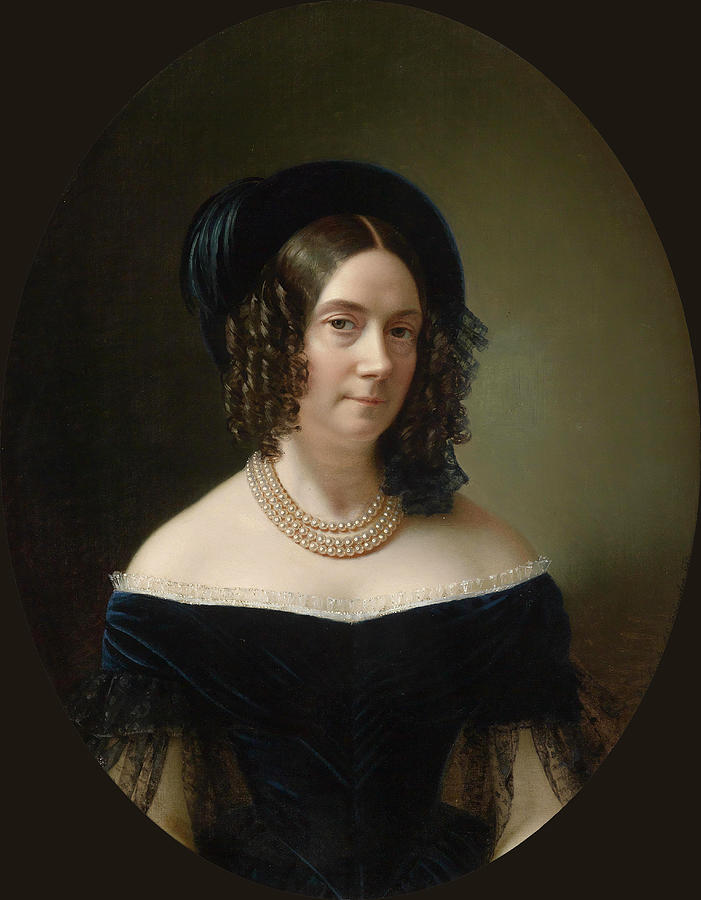
- 1843 portrait
- Born: 1 November 1797; Carlsruhe (Pokój), Silesia
- Died: 30 March 1855 (aged 57); Budapest, Hungary
- Spouse: Archduke Joseph, Palatine of Hungary (m. 1819; died 1847)
- Issue: Archduchess Franziska Marie; Archduke Alexander; Archduchess Elisabeth Franziska; Archduke Joseph Karl; Marie Henriette, Queen of the Belgians
Names
- Maria Dorothea Luise Wilhelmine Caroline
- House: Württemberg
- Father: Duke Louis of Württemberg
- Mother: Princess Henriette of Nassau-Weilburg

Duchess Maria Dorothea of Württemberg (Maria Dorothea Luise Wilhelmine Caroline; 1 November 1797 in Carlsruhe (now Pokój), Silesia – 30 March 1855 in Pest, Hungary) was the daughter of Duke Louis of Württemberg and Princess Henriette of Nassau-Weilburg.

== Family ==
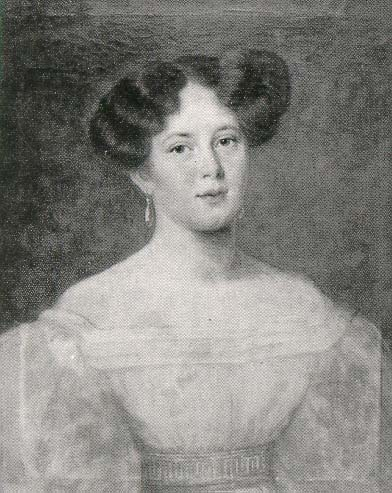
Maria Dorothea in 1818

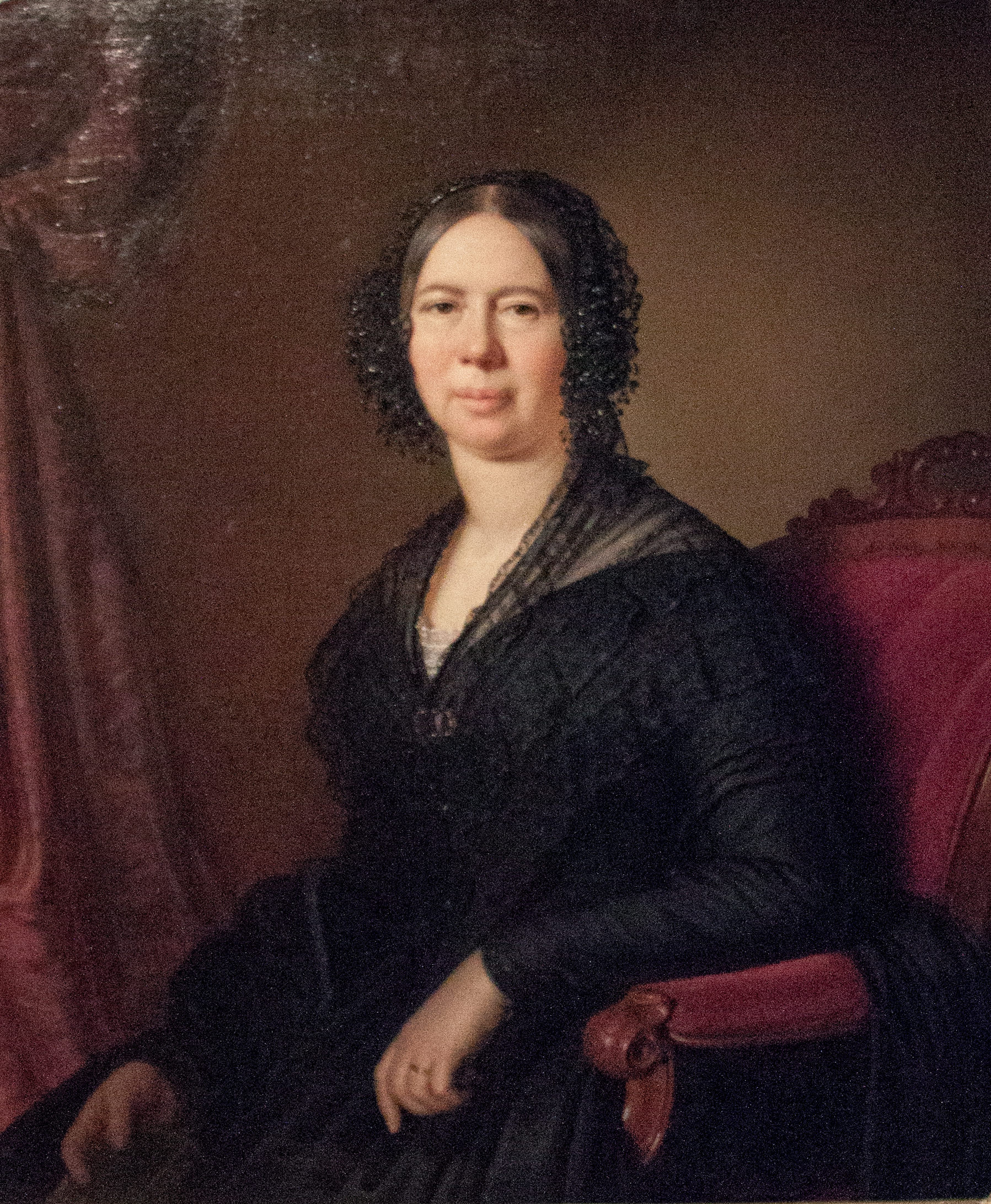
Archduchess Maria Dorothea

Maria Dorothea was the eldest of five children born to Duke Louis of Württemberg and his second wife Princess Henriette of Nassau-Weilburg. She was born in Carlsruhe (now Pokój), Silesia, now Poland.

Her brother Alexander was the grandfather of Mary of Teck, the future queen consort of George V of the United Kingdom, Thus, Maria Dorothea was the great-aunt of queen consort Mary of United Kingdom.

She was tutored by her governess, the known memoirist Alexandrine des Écherolles, who described her pupils in her memoirs.

== Marriage and children ==
She was the third wife of Archduke Joseph, Palatine of Hungary, to whom she was married on 24 August 1819. They had five children:

Name	Portrait	Lifespan	Notes
Archduchess Franziska Marie of Austria		30 July 1820 – 23 August 1820	Died in infancy.
Archduke Alexander of Austria		6 June 1825 – 12 November 1837	Died in childhood
Archduchess Elisabeth Franziska of Austria		17 January 1831 – 14 February 1903	Married firstly Archduke Ferdinand Karl Viktor of Austria-Este and had issue; married secondly Archduke Karl Ferdinand of Austria and had issue.
Archduke Joseph Karl of Austria		2 March 1833 – 13 June 1905	Married Princess Clotilde of Saxe-Coburg and Gotha and had issue.
Archduchess Marie Henriette of Austria		23 August 1836 – 19 September 1902	Married Leopold II of Belgium and had issue.

== Ancestry ==
Ancestors of Duchess Maria Dorothea of Württemberg

8. Charles Alexander, Duke of Württemberg
4. Frederick II Eugene, Duke of Württemberg
9. Princess Marie Auguste of Thurn and Taxis
2. Duke Louis of Württemberg
10. Frederick William, Margrave of Brandenburg-Schwedt
5. Margravine Friederike of Brandenburg-Schwedt
11. Princess Sophia Dorothea of Prussia
1. Duchess Maria Dorothea of Württemberg
12. Charles August, Prince of Nassau-Weilburg
6. Charles Christian, Prince of Nassau-Weilburg
13. Augusta Frederika Wilhelmina of Nassau-Idstein
3. Princess Henriette of Nassau-Weilburg
14. William IV, Prince of Orange
7. Princess Carolina of Orange-Nassau
15. Anne, Princess Royal
