= Boček II of Poděbrady =

Bohemian noble and official (died 1417)

- Born: unknown
- Died: 1417
- Noble family: House of Poděbrady
- Spouse: Anna Elisabeth Lipá
- Father: Boček I of Poděbrady
- Mother: Elisabeth of Lichtemburk

Boček II of Poděbrady (also: Boček II of Kunštát and Poděbrady; German: Boček II. von Kunstadt und Podiebrad or German: Botschek von Podiebrad or German: Botschek der Ältere von Podiebrad; Czech: Boček II. z Poděbrad or Czech: Boček II. z Kunštátu a Poděbrad or Czech: Boček starší z Poděbrad; died: 1417) may have been treasurer or even chief treasurer of Bohemia between 1377 and 1387. Between 1403 and 1408, he held the office of Oberstlandschreiber ("chief administrator") of Bohemia.

== Life ==
It is not known when and where Boček II was born. His parents were Boček I of Poděbrady and Elisabeth of Lichtemburk (German: Elisabeth von Lichtenburg; Czech: Eliska z Lichtemburka), a daughter of Henry of Lichtenburg at Žleby Castle. Boček was named after the founder of the Poděbrady branch of the House of Kunštát. Boček is sometimes called "the Elder", to contrast him with his son Boček III of Poděbrady, who was called "Boček the Younger".

Boček II is first mentioned in a deed of 1375, about the division of the inheritance of his father, who died in 1373. Since Boček II was the first born, he inherited the larger part of his father's possessions, which were mostly in eastern Bohemia. In 1376 he received Lipnice as a fief from the King Charles IV of Bohemia. In 1377, he transferred the Lordship of Potštát to his wife Anna Elisabeth as a dowry. Between 1377 and 1387, he may have held the position of Treasurer or Chief Treasurer of Bohemia. In 1387 Boček II and Půta II of Častolovice bought the Lordship of Skuhrov nad Bělou and Rychmberk Castle in the foothills of the Orlické hory mountains from the brothers Jan and Jaroslav of České Meziříčí.

During the reign of King Wenceslaus IV, Boček II was initially on his side, but later turned away from him. In 1394 he was among the League of Lords who signed the initiative of the Margrave Jobst of Moravia, a joint statement with which they turned against the king, who was eventually captured. Presumably in return for this support, Margrave Jobst gave Boček possessions in Moravia. In 1402 he supported King Wenceslaus again, in that he was against the candidacy of Wenceslaus brother Sigismund. This is probably why he received the position of Oberstlandschreiber (chief administrator) of Bohemia in 1403. He also was chairman of the manorial court and member of the royal Council.

Thanks to a mutual inheritance treaty from 1385 between Boček and his relative Gerhard of Kunštát, Boček II was able to strengthen his position in Moravia after Gerhard's death in 1406. From Gerhards he inherited among others Kunštát, Bouzov, Moravská Třebová, Pyšolec Castle, Boskovice, Týnec na Moravě and Velké Bílovice. He sold some of these possessions soon afterwards.

In early 1415, Boček II signed a petition, in which the high Bohemian nobles protested against the capture of Jan Hus. Later that year, after Hus was burned at the stake, Boček was the third noble to sign a letter of complaint by the Bohemian nobility. Also in 1415, Boček acquired the Lordships of Náchod and Hummel in Eastern Bohemia from Henry of Lazan, in exchange for the South Bohemian Lordship of Bechyně. Since the latter still belonged to Bohemia, Boček came geographically closer to the County of Kladsko, which would be very important to his descendants and would serve as a county seat and seat of power to the sons of George of Poděbrady. They would become counts of Kladsko, and as Dukes of Münsterberg they would found the Silesian (Münsterberg-Oels) branch of the Poděbrady family.

== Marriage and offspring ==
Boček II was married with Anna Elisabeth Lipa (Czech: Anna Eliška Lipá), a daughter of Henry of Leipa (Czech: Jindřich Lipá). The couple had four sons:

1. John (German: Johann; Czech: Jan; died circa 1408), married in 1398 with Elisabeth of Wartenberg (Czech: Eliska z Vartenberka)
2. Boček III of Poděbrady, (d. 1429)
3. Hynek Boček of Poděbrady (d. 1426), married N. N. of Žerotín
4. Victor of Kunštát and Poděbrady (1403–1427), married Anna of Wartenberg (Czech: Anna z Vartenberka)
