= Princess Henriette of Nassau-Weilburg =

Princess Henriette
- Duchess Louis of Württemberg
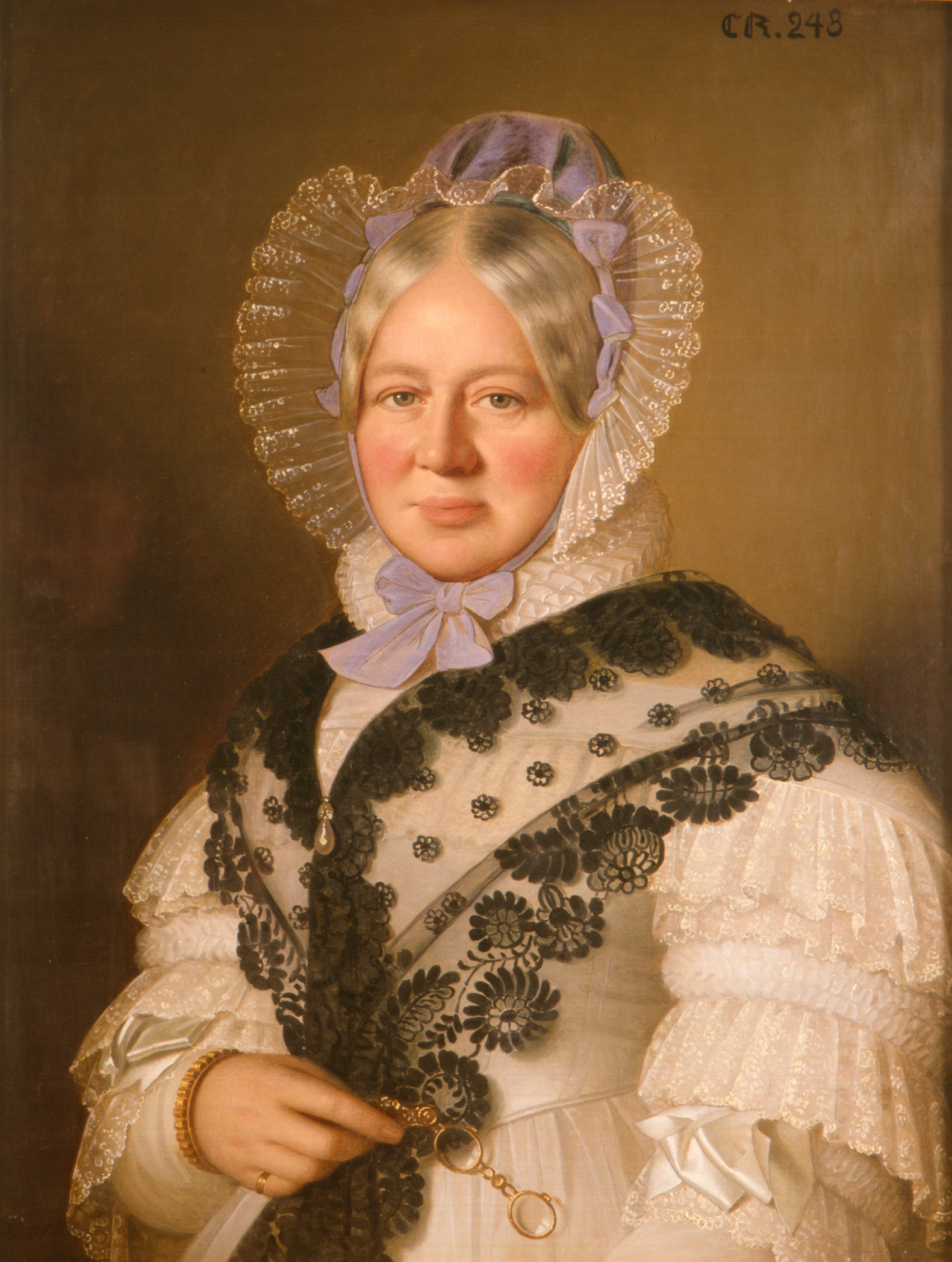
- 1838 portrait
- Born: 22 April 1780; Kirchheimbolanden, County of Nassau-Weilburg, Holy Roman Empire
- Died: 2 January 1857 (aged 76); Kirchheim unter Teck, Kingdom of Württemberg, German Confederation
- Spouse: Duke Louis of Württemberg (m. 1797; died 1817)
- Issue: Archduchess Maria Dorothea, Palatina of Hungary; Amelia, Duchess of Saxe-Altenburg; Pauline Therese, Queen of Württemberg; Elisabeth Alexandrine, Princess of Baden; Duke Alexander
- House: Nassau-Weilburg
- Father: Charles Christian, Prince of Nassau-Weilburg
- Mother: Princess Carolina of Orange-Nassau

Princess Henriëtte of Nassau-Weilburg, then of Nassau (22 April 1780, in Kirchheimbolanden – 2 January 1857, in Kirchheim unter Teck) was a German duchess. She was a daughter of Prince Charles Christian and Carolina of Orange-Nassau, daughter of William IV, Prince of Orange.

== Early life ==
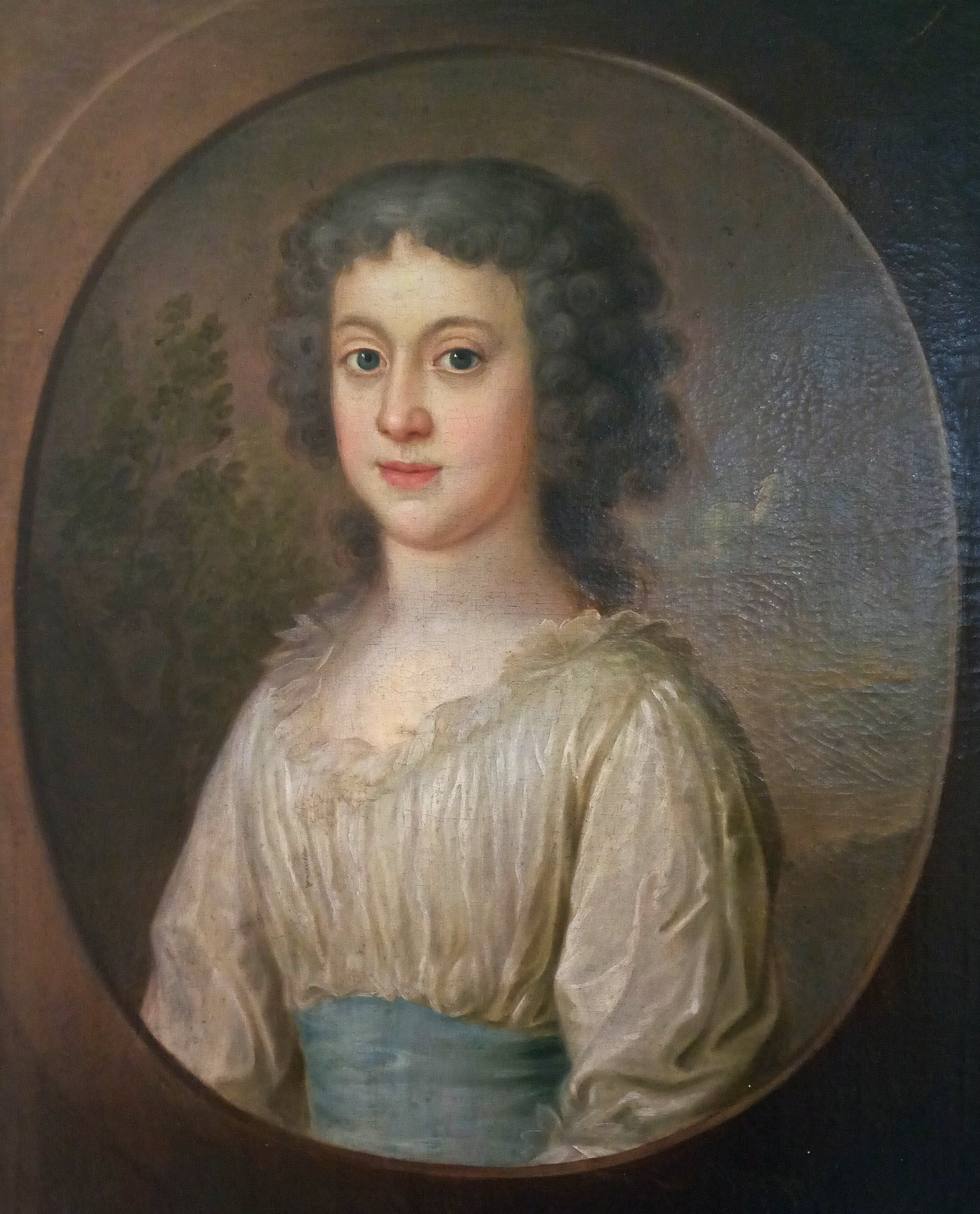
Portrait of a 12-year-old Henriette by Johann Schlesinger, 1792

Princess Henriette was born on 22 April 1780 in Kirchheimbolanden, in the County of Nassau-Weilburg. She was the daughter of Charles Christian, Prince of Nassau-Weilburg and Princess Carolina of Orange-Nassau. Through her mother she was connected to the House of Welf and thus was a great granddaughter of King George II of Great Britain.

Having lost both parents at an early age, she was raised under the care of her elder brother, Frederick William, Prince of Nassau-Weilburg.

== Marriage and children ==
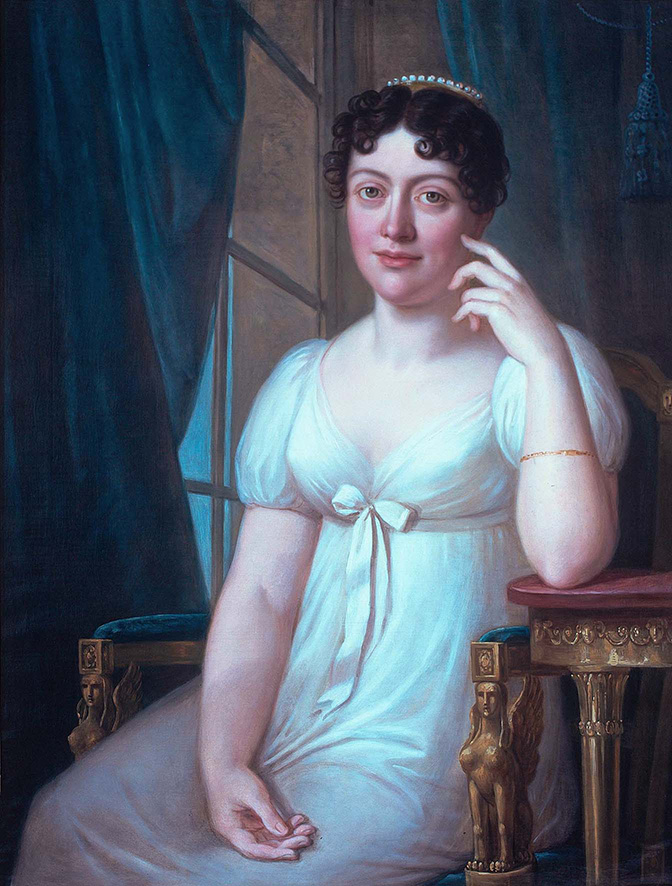
Princess Henriette, c. 1800

On 28 January 1797, she married Duke Louis of Württemberg, son of Friedrich II Eugen, Duke of Württemberg, at the Hermitage near Bayreuth.

They had five children:

- Maria Dorothea (1 November 1797 – 30 March 1855); married in 1819 Archduke Joseph, Palatine of Hungary (1776–1847). They had five children.
- Amelie Theresa (28 June 1799 – 28 November 1848); married in 1817 Joseph, Duke of Saxe-Altenburg (1789–1868). They had six daughters.
- Pauline Therese (4 September 1800 – 10 March 1873), married in 1820 her first cousin William I of Wurttemberg. They had three children.
- Elisabeth Alexandrine (27 February 1802 – 5 December 1864); married in 1830 Prince Wilhelm of Baden (1792–1859). They had four daughters.
- Alexander (9 September 1804 – 4 July 1885); founded a cadet branch of the House of Württemberg, known as the Dukes of Teck. He married Countess Claudine Rhédey von Kis-Rhéde in 1835. They had three children.

Her husband initially served as an officer in Prussia and, from 1800 onward, as a general in Russia. His career involved frequent relocations, which Henriette accompanied, resulting in her giving birth to their five children in five different locations.

After years of instability, during which Duke Louis accumulated considerable debts, his brother, King Frederick I of Württemberg, designated Schloss Kirchheim in 1811 as the family's permanent residence. In the early years, her attention was largely taken up by her family responsibilities, in particular, the care of her ailing husband, who died in 1817.

== Work ==
During her forty-year widowhood, Princess Henriette devoted significant energy and resources to philanthropic and social welfare causes, particularly in the town of Kirchheim unter Teck and the surrounding region.

Princess Henriette was an early proponent of practical education for less privileged children. She offered support to newly established industrial or "craft" schools in Kirchheim under Teck, which were designed to teach poor children basic manual skills (for example spinning and weaving) so that they could earn a living. Through her patronage she helped bridge the gap between aristocratic responsibility and grassroots social needs.

She also backed the establishment of a "Kleinkinderschule" (toddlers'/infants' school) which, over time, evolved into what is now the modern kindergarten of the region (the present‑day Teck‑Kindergarten).

She was the prominent driving force behind the establishment of the orphanage known as the "Paulinenpflege" in Kirchheim unter Teck: an orphanage she organised and funded together with municipal authorities and a foundation council. It opened in 1826 and provided a structured home and education for orphans under her patronage.

In addition, through her personal resources and status she lent her name and influence to the creation of one of the most advanced hospitals of the era in her region. Her involvement included initiating, supporting, or underwriting the construction, equipping and inauguration of the hospital in 1840, which then bore the name "Wilhelmshospital" in honour of her son‑in‑law, King William I of Württemberg. Her impetus in healthcare marked her as a forward‑looking philanthropist.

At her request, Albert Knapp, a devoted representative of Pietism, served as a preacher in Kirchheim unter Teck for several years.

== Later life and death ==
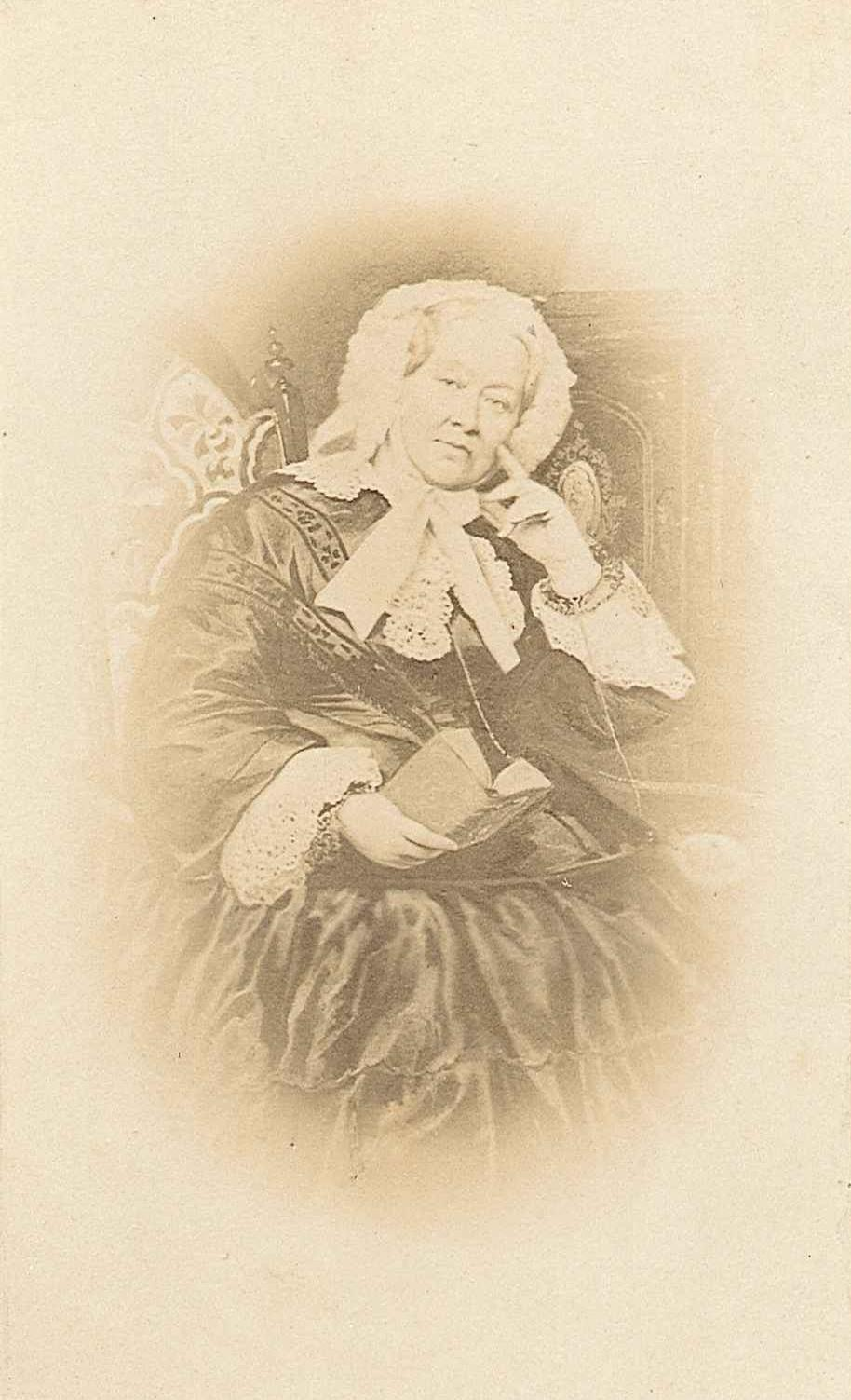
Photograph of Princess Henriette c. 1856

After the death of her husband in 1817, Henriette continued to reside at Schloss Kirchheim unter Teck, devoting herself to social welfare and charitable activities.

Princess Henriette died on 2 January 1857 in Kirchheim unter Teck, aged 76. Through her son Alexander, she was the great grandmother of Mary of Teck, who married King George V of the United Kingdom.

== Ancestry ==
Ancestors of Princess Henriette of Nassau-Weilburg

8. John Ernst, Count of Nassau-Weilburg
4. Charles August, Prince of Nassau-Weilburg
9. Countess Maria Polyxena of Leiningen-Dagsburg-Hardenburg
2. Charles Christian, Prince of Nassau-Weilburg
10. George August, Count of Nassau-Idstein
5. Princess Auguste Friederike of Nassau-Idstein
11. Princess Henriette Dorothea of Oettingen-Oettingen
1. Princess Henriette of Nassau-Weilburg
12. John William Friso, Prince of Orange
6. William IV, Prince of Orange
13. Landgravine Marie Louise of Hesse-Kassel
3. Princess Carolina of Orange-Nassau
14. George II of Great Britain
7. Anne, Princess Royal
15. Caroline of Ansbach
