= Wolany, Lower Silesian Voivodeship =

Wolany
- Village
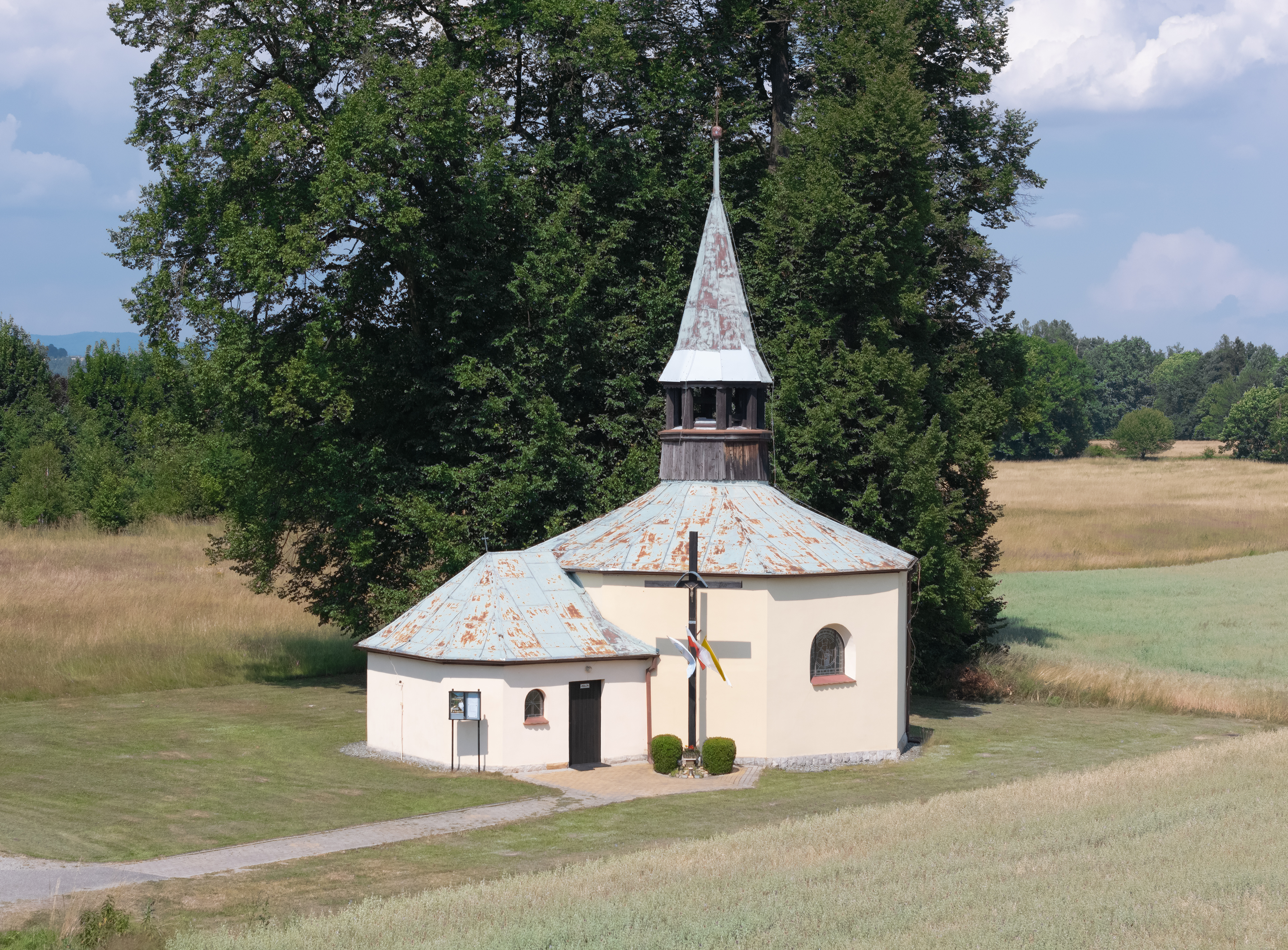

- Location within Poland
- Coordinates: 50°26′17″N 16°31′06″E
- Country: Poland
- Voivodeship: Lower Silesian
- County: Kłodzko
- Gmina: Szczytna

Wolany [vɔˈlanɨ] is a village in the administrative district of Gmina Szczytna, within Kłodzko County, Lower Silesian Voivodeship, in south-western Poland.

== Notable residents ==
- Duchess Amelia of Württemberg (1799–1848)
