= Victor of Kunštát and Poděbrady =

Bohemian-Moravian nobleman (1403–1427)

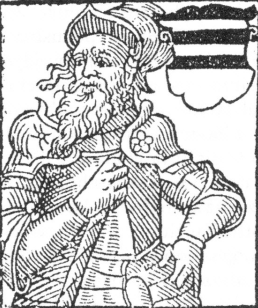
- Born: 1403
- Died: 1 January 1427 (aged 23–24); Pardubice
- Noble family: House of Poděbrady
- Spouse: Anna of Wartenberg
- Father: Boček II of Poděbrady
- Mother: Anna Elisabeth of Leipa

Victor of Kunštát and Poděbrady (also: Viktorin of Poděbrady, Victor Boček of Poděbrady, Victor Boček of Kunstadt and Poděbrady; Czech: Viktorín z Poděbrad, or Viktorín Boček z Kunštátu a Poděbrad; German: Viktorin von Podiebrad; 1403 – 1 January 1427 in Pardubice) was a knight, a Bohemian-Moravian nobleman, and a member of the House of Poděbrady. He was supporter of the Hussites and father of the Bohemian King George of Poděbrady.

== Life ==
Victor was born into the noble Poděbrady family. His parents were Boček II of Poděbrady and Anna Elisabeth of Leipa (Czech: Anna Eliška Lipá), a daughter of Henry of Leipa (Czech: Jindřich z Lipé). He gave several of his sons the middle name of Boček, a name which many of his ancestors had had.

Victor was first mentioned in a document dated 1417 dealing with the inheritance of his father, who died in that year. Victor inherited the Bohemian lordships of Náchod and Hummel, and Litice Castle, which became his headquarters and which was the reason he sometimes called himself Lord at Litice. He inherited his father's Moravian estates jointly with his older brother Boček III of Poděbrady. His youngest brother Hynek inherited Poděbrady Castle and the associated estate. The eldest brother, John, died during his father's lifetime, sometime between 1407 and 1409. Victor and Boček III fought several court cases about their Moravian possessions, among others with their distant relatives Gerald Puška of Kunštát and Smil of Kunštát at Bludov.

Around 1420, Victor acquired the dominion of Pardubice, which extended his eastern Bohemia possessions considerably. His brother Hynek died in 1426 during the battle of Nymburk. After Hynek's death, Victor inherited his dominion of Poděbrady, and also Mydlovar Castle, which Hynek had taken illegally in 1425.

Like his brothers Victor supported the Hussites. In 1420 he participated in the siege of Vyšehrad in part and joined the Orebites. Early in 1422 he approached Jan Žižka, and became his supporter and friend. For this reason Litice was besieged in 1421 by the armies of the princes and catholic nobles who sided with emperorSigismund. After Žižka's death, Victor lead the Sirotčí for a while, but then he sided with the more moderate citizens of Prague.

From his marriage with Anna of Wartenberg (Czech: Anna z Vartenberka; born: 1403; died: 1459), he had three children:

- George (1420–1471), who became King of Bohemia in 1458
- Alžběta (1422–1501), married Jindřich z Dubé a Lipé
- Markéta (1425–1476), married Bohuslav ze Žeberka a Plané

Victor died on 1 January 1427 at his Pardubice Castle. Soon after his death, Jan Hlaváč of Ronov claimed both the castle and the eponymous estate.
