= Złotno =

- Village
- Location within Poland
- Coordinates: 50°25′N 16°25′E
- Country: Poland
- Voivodeship: Lower Silesian
- County: Kłodzko
- Gmina: Szczytna

Złotno [ˈzwɔtnɔ] is a village in the administrative district of Gmina Szczytna, within Kłodzko County, Lower Silesian Voivodeship, in south-western Poland.
