= Łężyce, Lower Silesian Voivodeship =

Łężyce
- Village
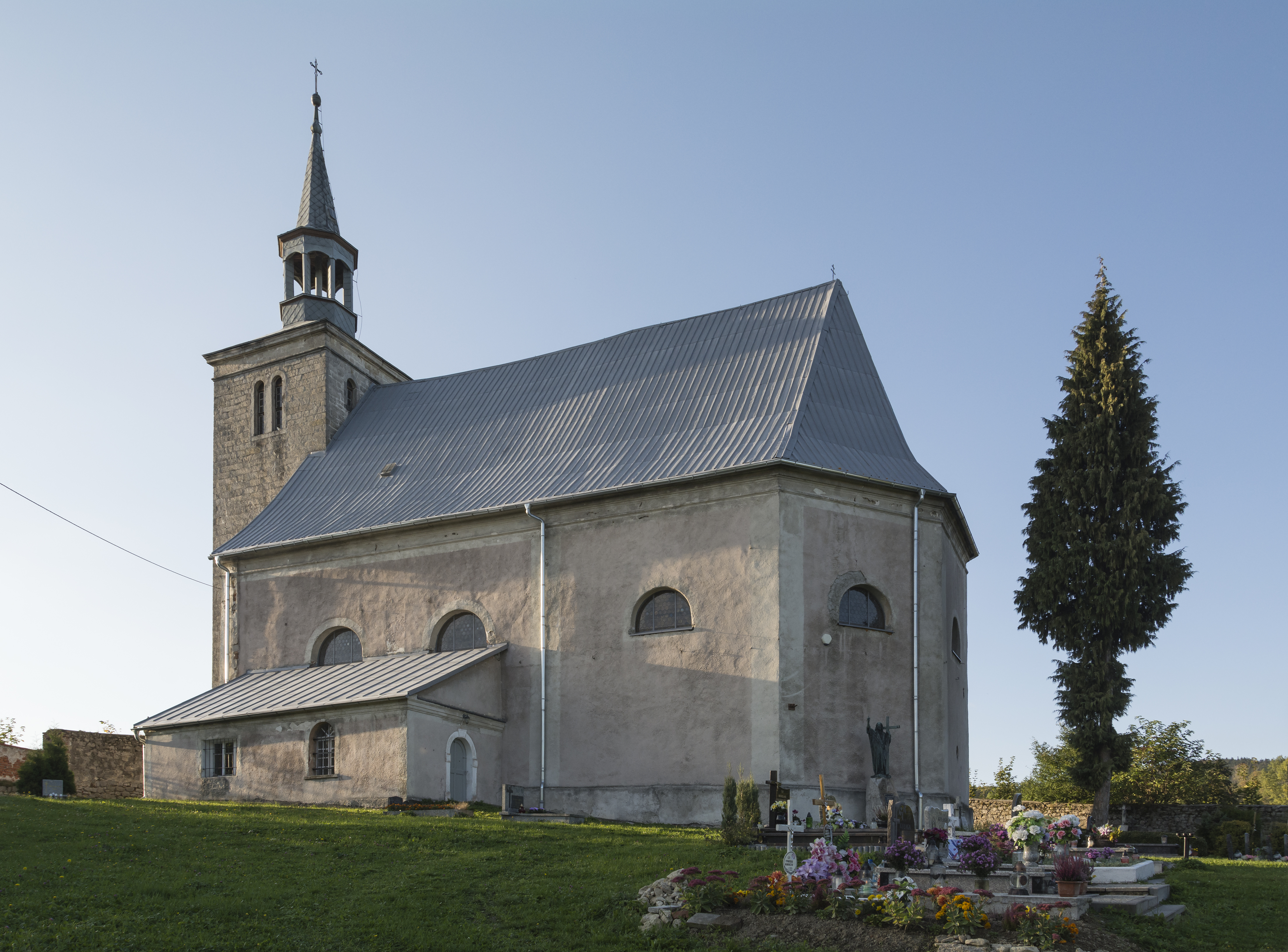

- Location within Poland
- Coordinates: 50°26′N 16°21′E
- Country: Poland
- Voivodeship: Lower Silesian
- County: Kłodzko
- Gmina: Szczytna

Łężyce [wɛ̃ˈʐɨt͡sɛ] is a village in the administrative district of Gmina Szczytna, within Kłodzko County, Lower Silesian Voivodeship, in south-western Poland.
