= Szczytna =

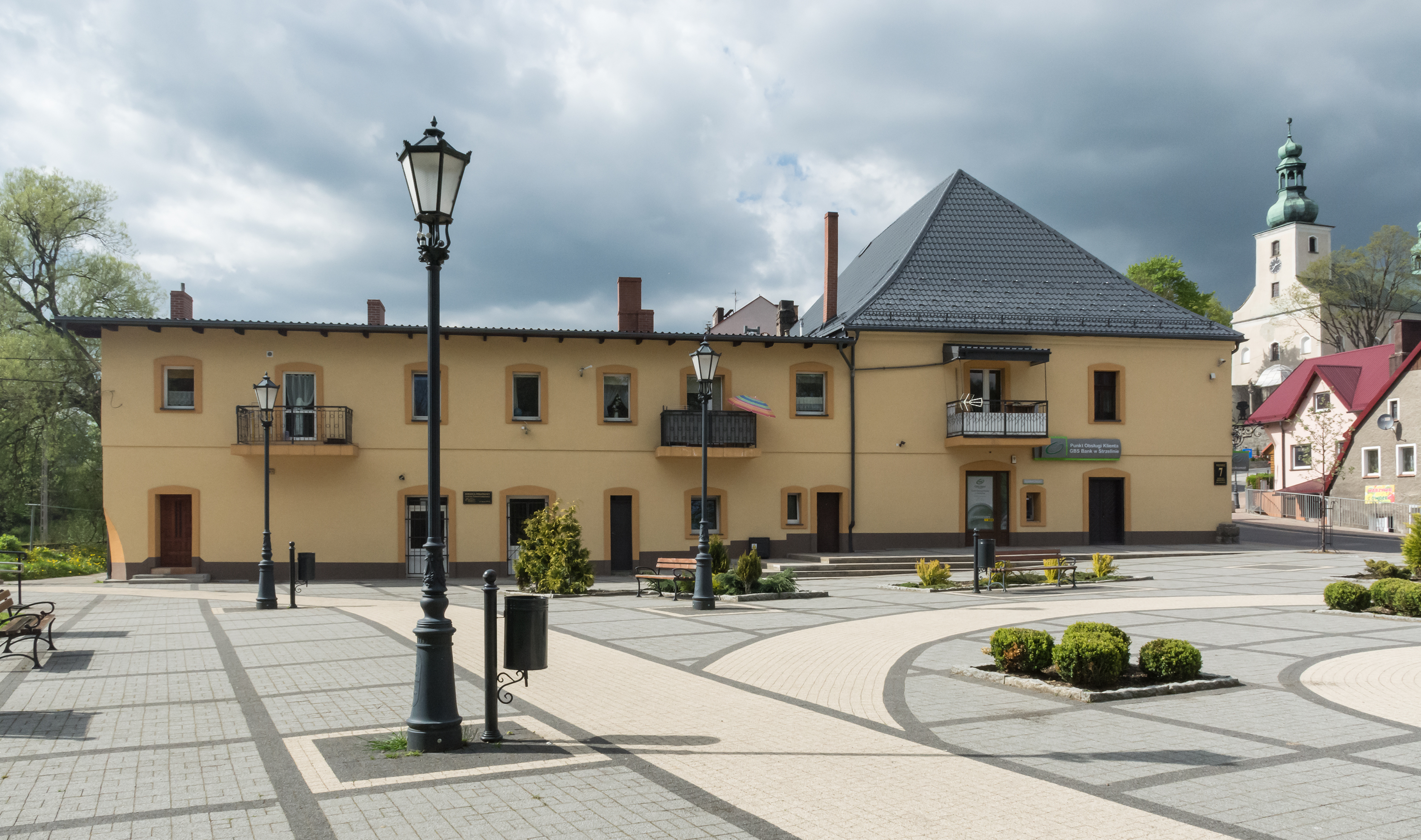
- Old Town

- Coat of arms

- Location within Poland
- Coordinates: 50°25′N 16°26′E
- Country: Poland
- Voivodeship: Lower Silesian
- County: Kłodzko
- Gmina: Szczytna

Area
  - Total: 80.38 km^{2} (31.03 sq mi)

Population (2019-06-30)
  - Total: 5,141
  - Density: 63.96/km^{2} (165.7/sq mi)
- Time zone: UTC+1 (CET)
  - Summer (DST): UTC+2 (CEST)
- Vehicle registration: DKL
- Website: http://www.szczytna.pl

Szczytna [ˈʂt͡ʂɨtna] (German: Rückers) is a town in Kłodzko County, Lower Silesian Voivodeship, in south-western Poland. It is the seat of the administrative district (gmina) called Gmina Szczytna, close to the Czech border

As at 2019, the town has a population of 5,141.

== History ==
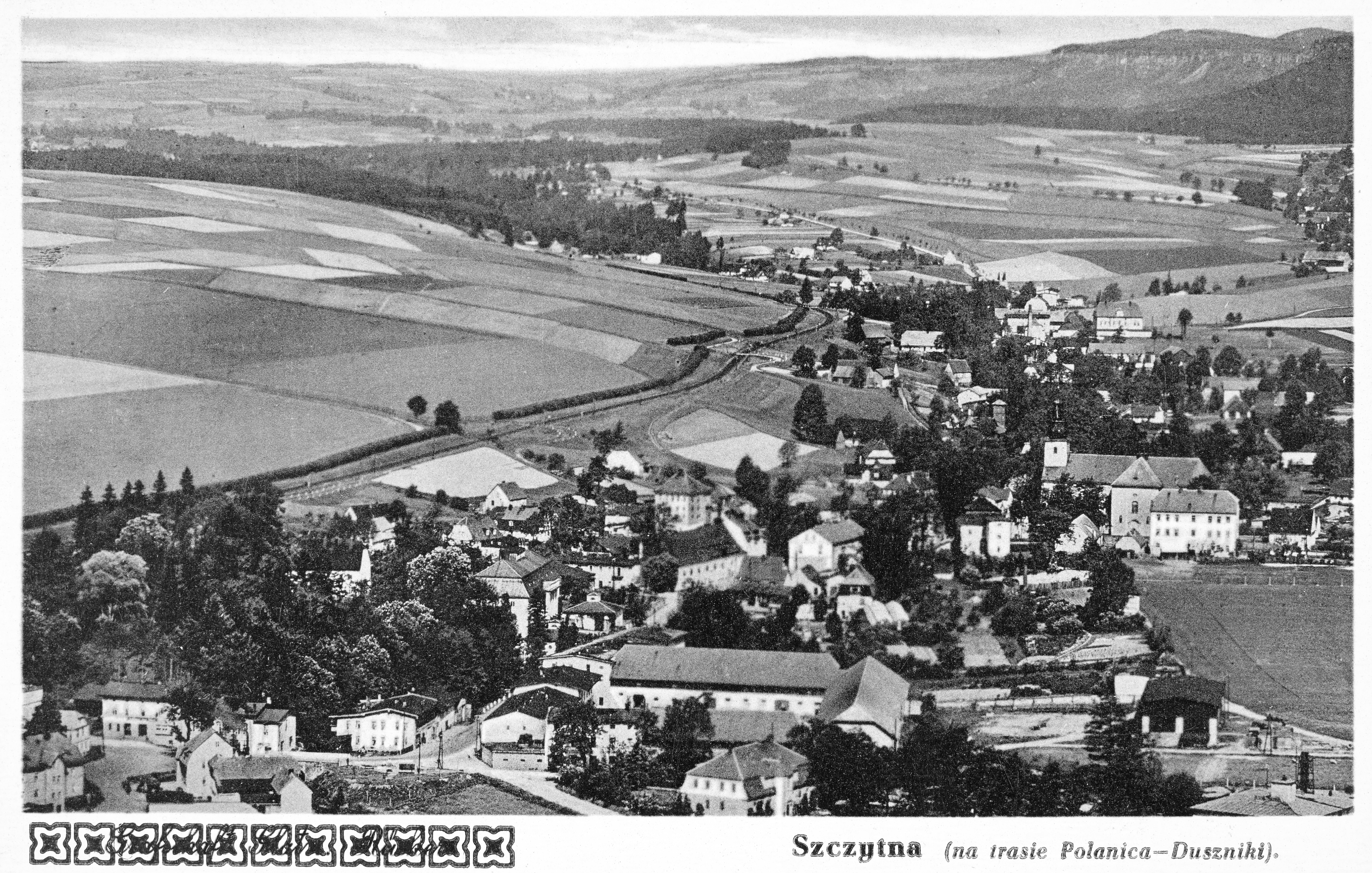
Pre-1945 view of the town

The settlement was first mentioned in the 14th century. The town was founded by German immigrants from Hesse. A village with the same German name exists in Hesse.

In the 18th century, it was annexed by Prussia. Two of the skirmishes of the War of the Bavarian Succession (1778–1779) occurred at the hamlet of Biebersdorf. In the first, on 7 August, Major Friedrich Joseph, Count of Nauendorf and two squadrons of the Wurmser Hussars, surprised a Prussian convoy, which surrendered 240 wagons of flour and 13 transport wagons. Nauendorf's Hussars also took as prisoners all the officers and 110 men, and captured 476 horses. While the parties negotiated at their differences at Teschen, on 3 March 1779, Nauendorf raided Biebersdorf again with a larger force of infantry and hussars and captured the entire Prussian garrison. Following this action, Joseph awarded him the Knight's Cross of the Military Order of Maria Theresa (19 May 1779).
