= Dolina, Lower Silesian Voivodeship =

Dolina
- Village
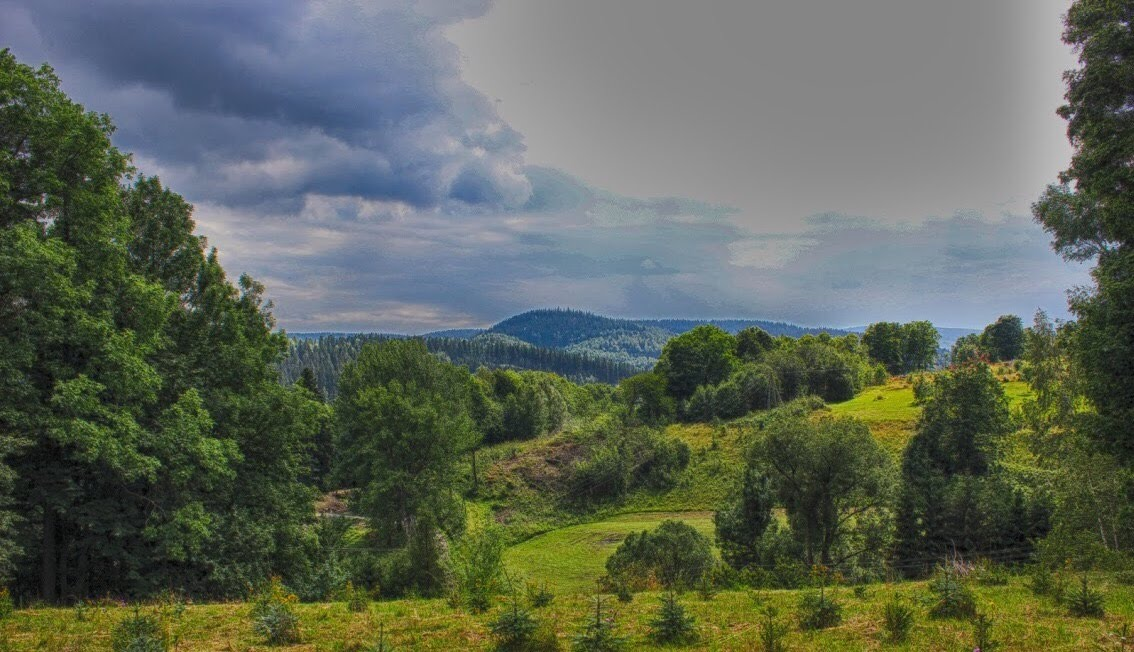

- Location within Poland
- Coordinates: 50°24′31″N 16°24′24″E
- Country: Poland
- Voivodeship: Lower Silesian
- County: Kłodzko
- Gmina: Szczytna

Population
  - Total: 121

Dolina [dɔˈlina] is a village in the administrative district of Gmina Szczytna, within Kłodzko County, Lower Silesian Voivodeship, in south-western Poland. It has a population of 121 according to the 2021 Polish census.
