= Prince William of Baden =

German prince (1792–1859)

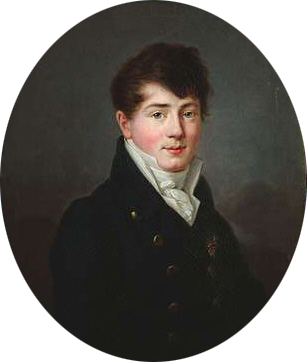
Wilhelm of Baden, painting attributed to Philipp Jacob Becker

Margrave Wilhelm of Baden (8 April 1792 in Karlsruhe – 11 October 1859 in Karlsruhe) was the second son of Karl Friedrich, Grand Duke of Baden and his second wife, Luise Karoline, Baroness Geyer von Geyersberg (26 May 1768 – 23 July 1820), the daughter of Lt. Col. Baron Ludwig Heinrich Philipp Geyer von Geyersberg and his wife, Countess Maximiliana Christiane von Sponeck. Because his marriage to Luise was considered by the House of Baden as morganatic, Wilhelm, for a time, had no succession rights to the Grand Duchy. For most of his life he was a part of the military, notably achieving the rank of colonel and commanding the Baden brigade in the Grande Armée during the French invasion of Russia.

== Marriage and family ==
He married on 16 October 1830, Duchess Elisabeth Alexandrine of Württemberg (27 February 1802 – 5 December 1864), the daughter of Duke Louis of Württemberg. They had the following children:

- Princess Henriette of Baden (7 May 1833 – 7 August 1834)
- Princess Sophie of Baden (7 August 1834 – 6 April 1904), married Woldemar, Prince of Lippe on 9 November 1858, no issue.
- Princess Elisabeth of Baden (18 December 1835 – 15 May 1891)
- Princess Leopoldine of Baden (22 February 1837 – 23 December 1903); married Hermann Ernst Franz Bernhard VI, Prince of Hohenlohe-Langenburg on 24 September 1862, and had issue.

== Ancestry ==
Ancestors of Prince William of Baden

8. Charles III William, Margrave of Baden-Durlach
4. Frederick, Hereditary Prince of Baden-Durlach
9. Duchess Magdalena Wilhelmine of Württemberg
2. Charles Frederick, Grand Duke of Baden
10. John William Friso, Prince of Orange
5. Princess Amalia of Nassau-Dietz
11. Landgravine Marie Louise of Hesse-Kassel
1. Prince William of Baden
12. Christian Heinrich Geyer von Geyersberg
6. Ludwig Heinrich Geyer von Geyersberg
13. Christiane Philippa von Thümmel
3. Baroness Caroline Louise Geyer of Geyersberg
14. Johann Rudolph Hedwiger, Count von Sponeck
7. Countess Maximiliana Christiane von Sponeck
15. Baroness Wilhelmine Louise von Hoff
