= Słoszów =

- Village
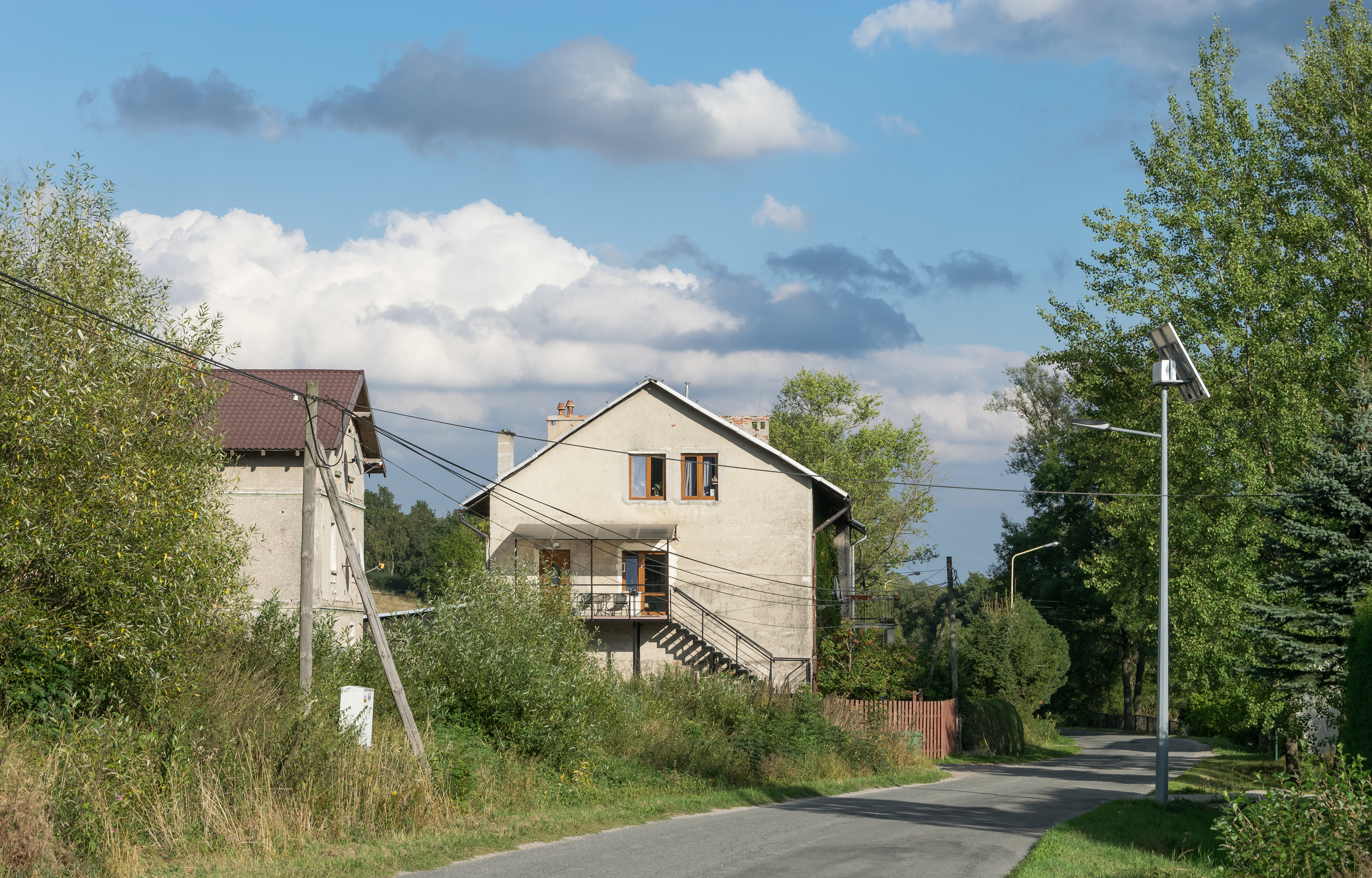

- Location within Poland
- Coordinates: 50°24′32″N 16°21′43″E
- Country: Poland
- Voivodeship: Lower Silesian
- County: Kłodzko
- Gmina: Szczytna

Słoszów [ˈswɔʂuf] German: Roms) is a village in the administrative district of Gmina Szczytna, within Kłodzko County, Lower Silesian Voivodeship, in south-western Poland.

== History ==
The town was colonized by Germans in the Middle Ages. Its German name Roms likely refers to the place Rommerz in Hesse.
