= Náměšť na Hané =

- Market town
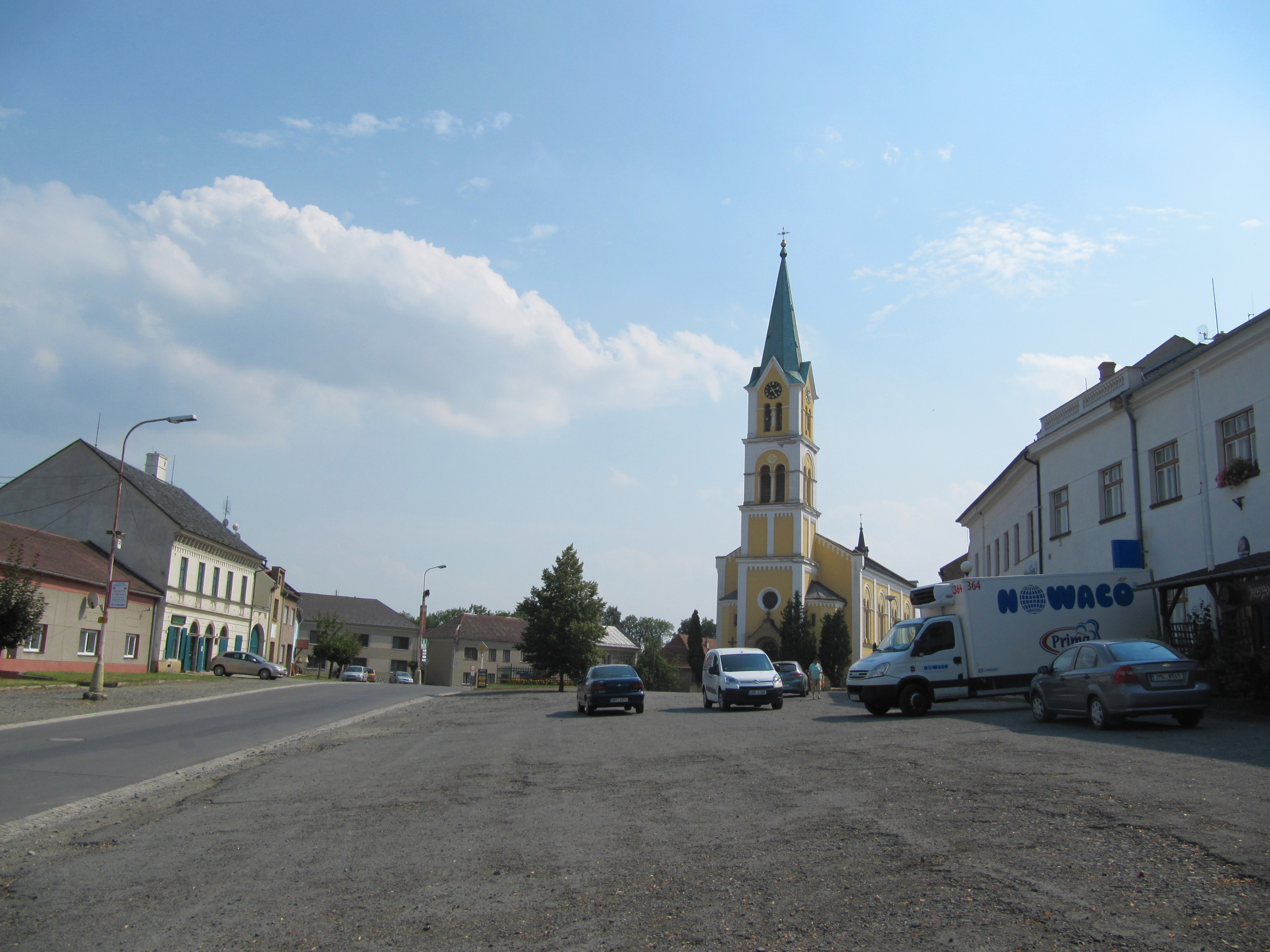
- Centre of Náměšť na Hané

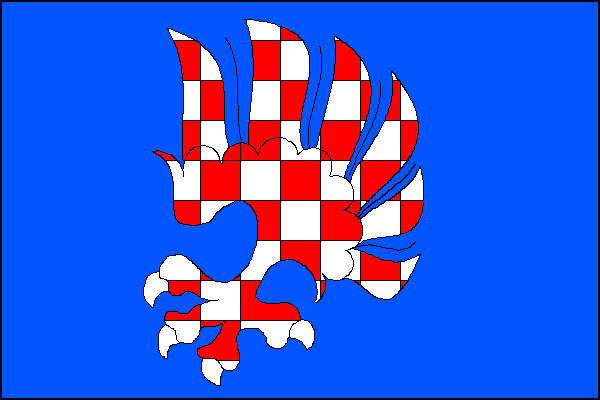
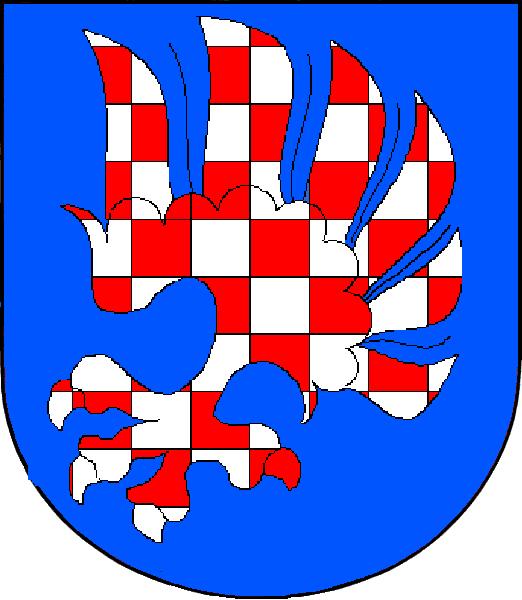
- Flag Coat of arms

- Location in the Czech Republic
- Coordinates: 49°36′16″N 17°3′36″E
- Country: Czech Republic
- Region: Olomouc
- District: Olomouc
- First mentioned: 1141

Area
  - Total: 18.65 km^{2} (7.20 sq mi)
- Elevation: 247 m (810 ft)

Population (2026-01-01)
  - Total: 2,255
  - Density: 120.9/km^{2} (313.2/sq mi)
- Time zone: UTC+1 (CET)
  - Summer (DST): UTC+2 (CEST)
- Postal code: 783 44
- Website: www.namestnahane.cz

Náměšť na Hané (Czech pronunciation: [ˈnaːmɲɛʃc ˈna ɦanɛː]) is a market town in Olomouc District in the Olomouc Region of the Czech Republic. It has about 2,300 inhabitants.

== Geography ==
Náměšť na Hané is located about 22 kilometres (14 mi) west of Olomouc. It lies on the border between the Zábřeh Highlands and Upper Morava Valley. The highest point is the hill Křemela at 406 m (1,332 ft) above sea level. The Šumice Stream flows through the market town.

== History ==
The first written mention of Náměšť na Hané is from 1141. In 1319, the village was promoted to a market town by King John of Bohemia. From 1536 to 1592, Náměšť na Hané was owned by the Lords of Vrbno. During their rule, the market town prospered. They had rebuilt the local fortress into a Renaissance castle. After 1592, the owners of the estate often changed. From 1726 to 1777, it was a property of Counts of Harrach, who had built here a new castle. In 1777, Náměšť na Hané was acquired by the Kinsky family by marriage.

== Demographics ==
Historical population

Year	Pop.	±%
1869	1,579	—
1880	1,582	+0.2%
1890	1,601	+1.2%
1900	1,666	+4.1%
1910	1,796	+7.8%

Year	Pop.	±%
1921	1,759	−2.1%
1930	1,881	+6.9%
1950	1,778	−5.5%
1961	1,935	+8.8%
1970	1,890	−2.3%

Year	Pop.	±%
1980	1,825	−3.4%
1991	1,818	−0.4%
2001	1,890	+4.0%
2011	1,961	+3.8%
2021	2,127	+8.5%

Source: Censuses

== Transport ==
Náměšť na Hané is located on the railway line Olomouc–Drahanovice.

== Sights ==
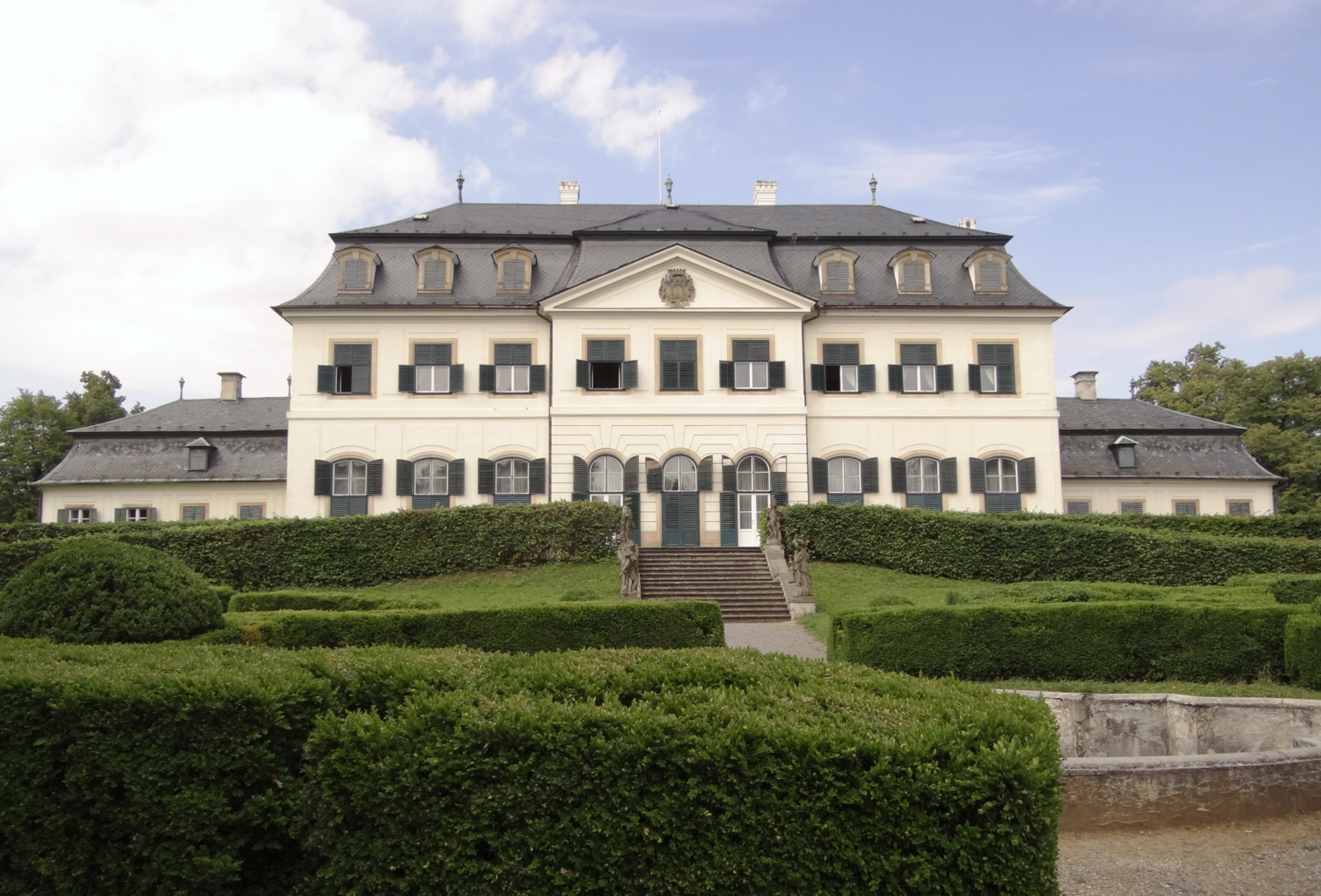
Náměšť na Hané Castle

The main landmark is the Náměšť na Hané Castle. It was built in the Baroque style in 1760–1763 for Count Ferdinand Bonaventura Harrach. The castle is surrounded by a circular park with an area of 2.5 ha (6.2 acres). Today the castle is open to the public and offers guided tours.

The older castle is now called Dolní zámek ('lower castle'). This small Renaissance castle was built in the 16th century and reconstructed in 1665, after it was damaged during the Thirty Years' War. From 1768, it was used as a textile manufacture, but soon it was changed to a malt house and it still serves this purpose today.

The original Church of Saint Cunigunde was built in 1656 at the latest, but after 1869, it was demolished because of its poor state. The current Neo-Romanesque church was built in 1871–1873.

== Twin towns – sister cities ==
Náměšť na Hané is twinned with:

- Levice, Slovakia
- Szczytna, Poland
