= Duke Louis of Württemberg =

Prussian nobleman (1756–1817)

Duke Ludwig of Württemberg
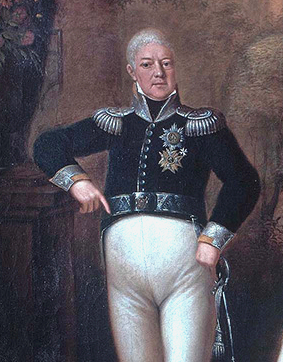
- Duke Louis painted c. 1809–1816
- Born: 30 August 1756; Treptow Palace, Treptow an der Rega, Province of Pomerania, Kingdom of Prussia
- Died: 20 September 1817 (aged 61); Kirchheim unter Teck, Kingdom of Württemberg, German Confederation
- Spouse: Princess Maria Czartoryska (m. 1784; div. 1793) Princess Henriette of Nassau-Weilburg (m. 1797)
- Issue: Duke Adam; Maria Dorothea, Archduchess Joseph of Austria; Amelia, Duchess of Saxe-Altenburg; Pauline Therese, Queen of Württemberg; Elisabeth Alexandrine, Princess William of Baden; Duke Alexander
Names
- Louis Frederick Alexander of Württemberg; German: Ludwig Friedrich Alexander von Württemberg
- House: Württemberg
- Father: Frederick II Eugene, Duke of Württemberg
- Mother: Princess Friederike of Brandenburg-Schwedt

Duke Ludwig Friedrich Alexander of Württemberg (German: Ludwig Friedrich Alexander Herzog von Württemberg; 30 August 1756, in Treptow an der Rega – 20 September 1817, in Kirchheim unter Teck) was the second son of Frederick II Eugene, Duke of Württemberg (1732–1797) and Margravine Sophia Dorothea of Brandenburg-Schwedt (1736–1798). His elder brother was Frederick I, the first King of Württemberg, and his sister was the Russian Empress consort, Maria Feodorovna. Louis retained the pre-royal title of Duke.

== Biography ==
Louis Frederick was a general in the cavalry. He was briefly a high ranking commander the Army of the Polish-Lithuanian Commonwealth appointed the commander of the Grand Duchy of Lithuania's army, but betrayed the Commonwealth, refusing to fight against Russian troops throughout the Polish–Russian War of 1792, while feigning illness. For his betrayal he was dismissed from his post, but never prosecuted. His Polish wife, Duchess Maria, divorced him shortly afterward after his treason became public knowledge.

Between 1807 and 1810, Duke Louis employed the composer Carl Maria von Weber as his secretary with no musical duties. Weber and the duke's older brother Frederick mutually disliked each other, and the composer was banished from Württemberg after accusations of misappropriating some of the duke's money.

== Marriages and issue ==
He married on 28 October 1784 Princess Maria Czartoryska, daughter of Prince Adam Kazimierz Czartoryski and his wife, Countess Isabella von Flemming. They had one child before they divorced in 1793 (Maria initiated the divorce upon the news of his betrayal of Poland):

- Adam Karl Wilhelm Stanislaus Eugen Paul Ludwig (16 January 1792 – 27 July 1847)

On 28 January 1797 in Hermitage, near Bayreuth, Louis Frederick was married to Princess Henriette of Nassau-Weilburg (then of Nassau), daughter of Charles Christian, Duke of Nassau-Weilburg and Princess Carolina of Orange-Nassau. The couple had five children:

- Maria Dorothea Luise Wilhelmine Karoline (1 November 1797 – 30 March 1855); married in 1819 Archduke Joseph of Austria (9 March 1776 – 13 January 1847).
- Amalie Therese Luise Wilhelmine Philippine (28 June 1799 – 28 November 1848); married in 1817 Joseph, Duke of Saxe-Altenburg (27 August 1789 – 25 November 1868). Via this marriage, Louis is an ancestor of Felipe VI of Spain, Prince Philip, Duke of Edinburgh, and Philip's son Charles III of the United Kingdom.
- Pauline Therese Luise (4 September 1800 – 10 March 1873); married in 1820 her first cousin, William I of Württemberg.
- Elisabeth Alexandrine Konstanze (27 February 1802 – 5 December 1864); married in 1830 Prince William of Baden (8 April 1792 – 11 October 1859).
- Alexander Paul Ludwig Konstantin (9 September 1804 – 4 July 1885); married, morganatically, on 2 May 1835, Countess Claudine Rhédey von Kis-Rhéde (21 September 1812 – 1 October 1841) and had issue; founded the second branch of the House of Württemberg, known as the Dukes of Teck. Via this marriage, Louis is an ancestor of Elizabeth II of the United Kingdom (Prince Philip's wife and Charles III's mother).

== Ancestry ==
Ancestors of Duke Louis of Württemberg

8. Frederick Charles, Duke of Württemberg-Winnental
4. Charles Alexander, Duke of Württemberg
9. Princess Eleonore Juliane of Brandenburg-Ansbach
2. Frederick II Eugene, Duke of Württemberg
10. Anselm Franz, Prince of Thurn and Taxis
5. Princess Marie Auguste of Thurn and Taxis
11. Princess Louise Anne of Lobkowicz
1. Duke Louis of Württemberg
12. Philip William, Margrave of Brandenburg-Schwedt
6. Frederick William, Margrave of Brandenburg-Schwedt
13. Princess Johanna Charlotte of Anhalt-Dessau
3. Princess Friederike of Brandenburg-Schwedt
14. Frederick William I of Prussia
7. Princess Sophia Dorothea of Prussia
15. Princess Sophia Dorothea of Hanover
