= Alexandrine des Écherolles =

French memoirist (1779–1850)

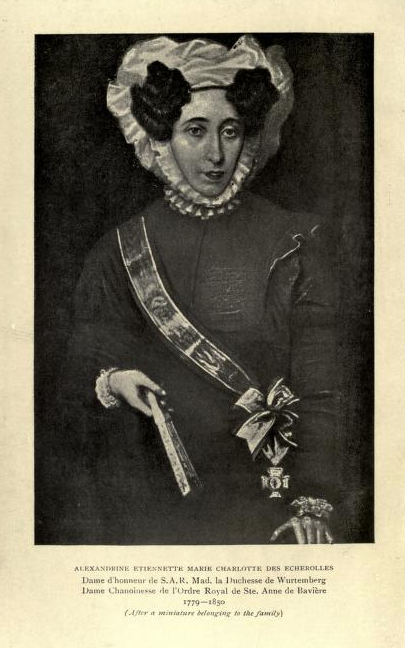
Mlle des Écherolles (portrait miniature reproduced as frontispiece of the 1900 English-language edition of the memoirs)

Alexandrine Etiennette Marie Charlotte des Écherolles (1779 – 1850) was a French memoirist, writing of her experiences during the French Revolution.

== Life ==
She was born in the Château des Écherolles in La Ferté-Hauterive, Allier, the daughter of Joseph-Étienne Giraud des Écherolles, a royalist officer of the provincial lower nobility. Her mother, Marie Anne Odile (née de Tarade), died while Alexandrine was still a child, so she was brought up by her paternal aunt.

In 1792, the family fled from their home town of Moulins to Lyon, where they experienced the Lyon uprising and the following Siege of Lyon in 1793. Her aunt was arrested and executed during the Reign of Terror following the Siege, while her father fled to Switzerland. She was reunited with her father after the fall of Robespierre.

In later life she was appointed governess to the princesses of the royal family of Württemberg, the daughters of Duke Louis of Württemberg.

== Memoirs ==
Her memoirs describe her life in France, with emphasis on the events of the Revolution and her life in Lyon during the Reign of Terror, including the Lyon uprising.

They were first published in Moulins-sur-Allier in 1843 as Quelques Années de ma vie, and republished in 1879 in Paris as Une Famille Noble sous la Terreur.

English translations appeared as Private Trials and Public Calamities; or, The Early Life of Alexandrine des Écherolles during the troubles of the first French Revolution (London, 1853) and Side Lights on the Reign of Terror; being the memoirs of Mademoiselle des Écherolles (London, 1900).
