= Reuss =

Reuss or Reuß may refer to:

- Reuss (surname)
- Reuss (river) in Switzerland
- Imperial County of Reuss or Reuß, several former states (counties and principalities) in present-day Germany ruled by the House of Reuss, and the short-lived People's State of Reuss of 1919/1920
- Principality of Reuss-Greiz and Principality of Reuss-Gera
- House of Reuss, members include:
  - Countess Augusta Reuss of Ebersdorf (1757-1831)
  - Eleonore Reuss of Köstritz (1860-1917)
  - Heinrich Reuss (disambiguation), multiple persons
  - Hermine Reuss of Greiz (1887-1947)
  - Princess Victoria Feodora Reuss

== See also ==
- Reus (disambiguation)
