= Kolisko =

Kolisko is a surname. Notable people with the surname include:

- Alexander Kolisko (1857–1918), Austrian anatomist, pathologist
- Eugen Kolisko (1893–1939), Austrian-German physician, educator
