= Heinrich Reuss =

Heinrich Reuss is the name of many male members of the German noble House of Reuss. It may refer to:

- Henry II, Count of Reuss-Gera (1572–1635)
- Henry X, Count of Reuss-Lobenstein (1621–1671), first Count of Reuss-Lobenstein, youngest son of Henry II, Count of Reuss-Gera
- Heinrich X, Count of Reuss-Ebersdorf (1662–1711), Count of Reuss-Lobenstein and first Count of Reuss-Ebersdorf from 1678 to 1711, youngest son of Henry X, Count of Reuss-Lobenstein
- Heinrich XXIV, Count Reuss of Köstritz (1681–1748), first Count Reuss of Köstritz from 1692 to 1748
- Heinrich XXIX, Count of Reuss-Ebersdorf (1699–1747), Count of Reuss-Ebersdorf from 1711 to 1747, son of Heinrich X, Count of Reuss-Ebersdorf
- Heinrich von Reuss (Heinrich VI, 1707–1783), Danish government official, second son of Heinrich XXIV, Count Reuss of Köstritz
- Heinrich IX, Count Reuss of Köstritz (1711–1780), German lawyer, fourth son of Heinrich XXIV, Count Reuss of Köstritz
- Heinrich XI, Prince Reuss of Greiz (1722–1800), Count of Reuss-Obergreiz from 1723 to 1778 and first Prince Reuss of Greiz from 1778 to 1800
- Heinrich XXIV, Count Reuss of Ebersdorf (1724–1779), Count of Reuss-Ebersdorf from 1711 to 1779, eldest son of Heinrich XXIX, Count of Reuss-Ebersdorf
- Heinrich XIII, Prince Reuss of Greiz (1747–1817), Prince Reuss of Greiz from 1800 to 1817, second son of Heinrich XI, Prince Reuss of Greiz
- Heinrich XV, Prince Reuss of Greiz (1751–1825), Imperial Austrian field marshal, fourth son of Heinrich XI, Prince Reuss of Greiz
- Heinrich XLII, Prince Reuss-Schleiz und Gera (1752–1818), Count of Reuss-Schleiz from 1784 to 1802, first Count of Reuss-Schleiz und Gera from 1802 to 1806, and first Prince of Reuss-Schleiz und Gera from 1806 to 1818
- Heinrich LXII, Prince Reuss Younger Line (1785–1854), Prince of Reuss-Schleiz und Gera from 1818 to 1848 and first Prince Reuss Younger Line from 1848 to 1854, son of Heinrich XLII, Prince Reuss-Schleiz und Gera
- Heinrich LXIII, Prince Reuss of Köstritz (1786–1841), senior member of the Köstritz branch of the House of Reuss, grandson of Heinrich IX, Count Reuss of Köstritz
- Heinrich LXVII, Prince Reuss Younger Line (1789–1867), Prince Reuss Younger Line from 1854 to 1867, son of Heinrich XLII, Prince Reuss-Schleiz und Gera
- Heinrich XIX, Prince Reuss of Greiz (1790–1836), Prince Reuss of Greiz from 1817 to 1836, second son of Heinrich XIII, Prince Reuss of Greiz
- Heinrich XX, Prince Reuss of Greiz (1794–1859), Prince Reuss of Greiz from 1836 to 1859, third son of Heinrich XIII, Prince Reuss of Greiz
- Heinrich LXXII, Prince Reuss of Lobenstein and Ebersdorf (1797–1853), Prince of Reuss-Lobenstein from 1824 to 1848 and Reuss-Ebersdorf from 1822 to 1848, grandson of Heinrich XXIV, Count Reuss of Ebersdorf
- Heinrich VII, Prince Reuss of Köstritz (1825–1906), German diplomat and general, third son of Heinrich LXIII, Prince Reuss of Köstritz
- Heinrich XIV, Prince Reuss Younger Line (1832–1913), Prince Reuss Younger Line from 1867 to 1913, fourth son of Heinrich LXVII, Prince Reuss Younger Line
- Heinrich XXII, Prince Reuss of Greiz (1846–1902), Prince Reuss of Greiz from 1859 to 1902, eldest son of Heinrich XX, Prince Reuss of Greiz
- Heinrich XXIV, Prince Reuss of Köstritz (1855–1910), German composer
- Heinrich XXVII, Prince Reuss Younger Line (1858–1928), last reigning Prince Reuss Younger Line from 1913 to 1918, eldest son of Heinrich XIV, Prince Reuss Younger Line
- Heinrich XXIV, Prince Reuss of Greiz (1878–1927), last reigning Prince Reuss of Greiz from 1902 to 1918, son of Heinrich XXII, Prince Reuss of Greiz
- Heinrich XXXII, Prince Reuss of Köstritz (1878–1935), once heir presumptive to the Dutch throne, second son of Heinrich VII, Prince Reuss of Köstritz
- Heinrich XXXIII, Prince Reuss of Köstritz (1879–1942), German doctor and diplomat, third son of Heinrich VII, Prince Reuss of Köstritz
- Heinrich XLV, Prince Reuss Younger Line, (1895–c. 1945), last male member of the Reuss-Schleiz branch of the Younger Line of the House of Reuss, third son of Heinrich XXVII, Prince Reuss Younger Line
- Heinrich IV, Prince Reuss of Köstritz (1919–2012), Austrian head of the Reuss-Gera line
- Heinrich Ruzzo Prinz Reuss von Plauen (1950–1999), Swiss landscape architect
- Heinrich XIII Prinz Reuss (born 1951), German businessman, monarchist and an alleged leader of the 2022 German coup d'état plot
