= Heinrich XIV, Prince Reuss Younger Line =

Heinrich XIV
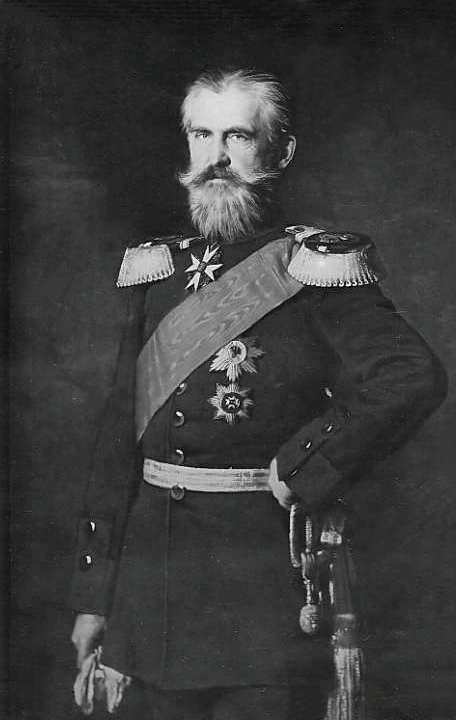
- Heinrich XIV, c. 1900

Prince Reuss of Gera
- Reign: 11 July 1867 – 29 March 1913
- Predecessor: Heinrich LXVII
- Successor: Heinrich XXVII
- Born: 28 May 1832; Coburg, Saxe-Coburg and Gotha
- Died: 29 March 1913 (aged 80); Schleiz, Reuss Younger Line
- Spouse: Duchess Agnes of Württemberg (m. 1858; died 1886) Friederike Graetz (m. 1890; died 1907)
- Issue: Heinrich XXVII, Prince Reuss Younger Line; Elisabeth, Princess Hermann of Solms-Braunfels; Baron Heinrich of Saalburg
- House: House of Reuss Younger Line
- Father: Heinrich LXVII, Prince Reuss Younger Line
- Mother: Princess Adelheid Reuss of Ebersdorf

Heinrich XIV, Prince Reuss Younger Line (German: Heinrich XIV Fürst Reuß jüngere Linie; 28 May 1832 – 29 March 1913) was Prince Reuss Younger Line from 1867 to 1913.

== Early life ==
Heinrich XIV was born at Coburg, Saxe-Coburg and Gotha, sixth child of Heinrich LXVII, Prince Reuss Younger Line, (son of Heinrich LXII, Prince Reuss Younger Line, and Princess Caroline of Hohenlohe-Kirchberg) and his wife, Princess Adelheid Reuss of Ebersdorf, (daughter of Heinrich LI, Prince Reuss of Ebersdorf and Countess Luise of Hoym).

== Prince Reuss Younger Line ==
At the death of his father on 11 July 1867, he inherited the throne of the Principality.

He became regent of Reuss Elder Line from 1902, because of a physical and mental disability of Prince Heinrich XXIV due to an accident in his childhood, at his death, his son continued the regency Prince Heinrich XXVII until the abolition of the German monarchies in 1918.

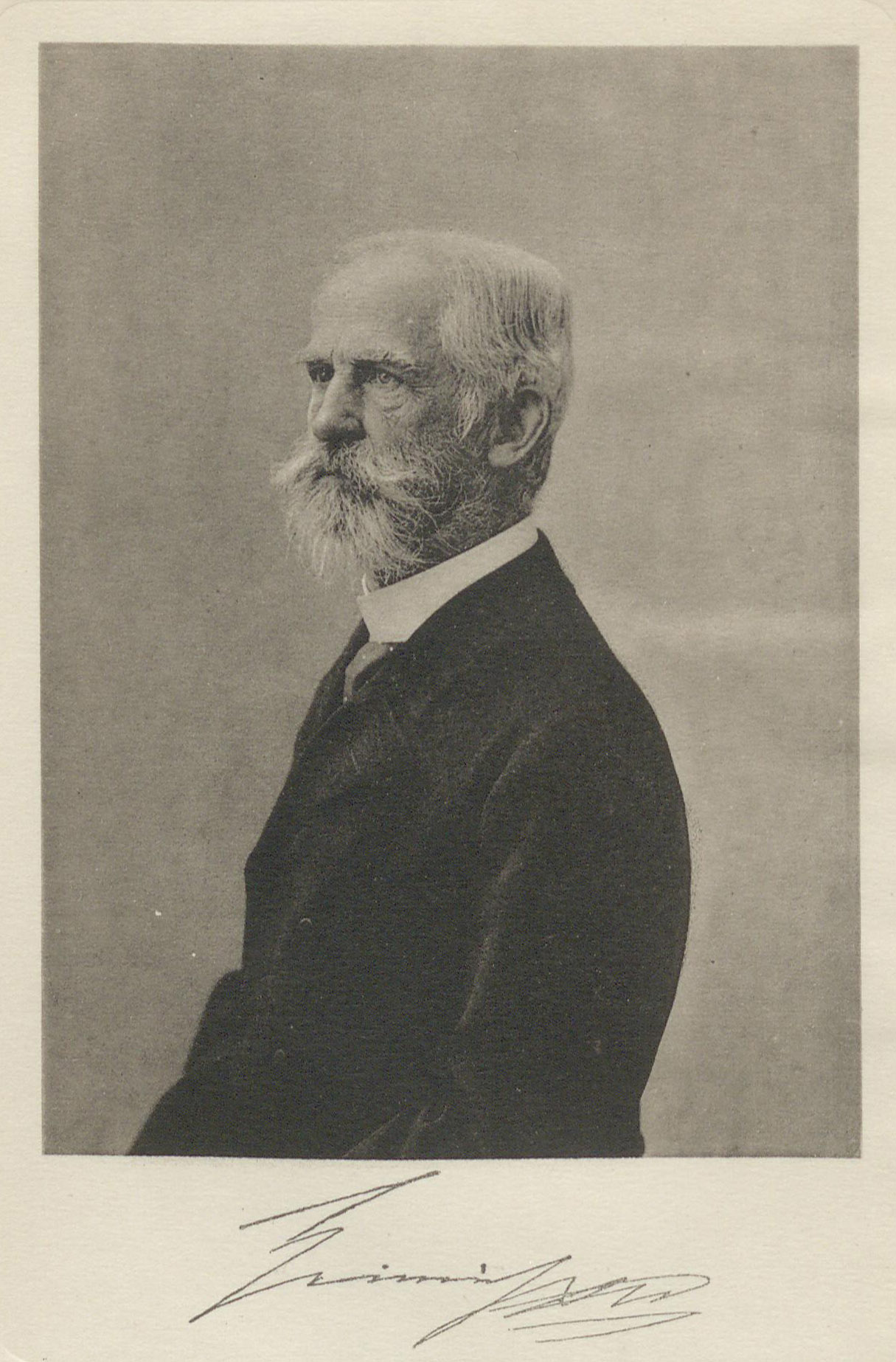
Heinrich XIV in his later years

In 1869 he founded the Reussian Prince Cross of Honour. (de:Reußisches Ehrenkreuz) and in 1897 he donated a Golden Medal of Distinguish Service (de:Goldenen Verdienstmedaille).

== Personal life ==
Heinrich XIV married on 6 February 1858 at Karlsruhe to Duchess Agnes of Württemberg, daughter of Duke Eugen of Württemberg and his second wife, Princess Helene of Hohenlohe-Langenburg.

They had two children:

- Heinrich XXVII, Prince Reuss Younger Line (10 November 1858 – 21 November 1928), married in 1884 to Princess Elise of Hohenlohe-Langenburg, had issue.
- Princess Elisabeth Reuss of Schleiz (27 October 1859 – 23 February 1951), married in 1887 to Prince Hermann of Solms-Braunfels, had issue.

He married secondly in a morganatic marriage on 14 February 1890 at Gera to Friederike Graetz, daughter of Johann Philipp Graetz and Augusta Neiss.

They had one son:

- Baron Heinrich of Saalburg (4 November 1875 – 23 February 1954), married in 1924 to Margarethe Groenwoldt, no issue.

== Honours ==
- Reuss: Founder of the Reussian Cross of Honour, 24 May 1869
- Austria-Hungary: Grand Cross of St. Stephen, 1884
- Kingdom of Bavaria: Knight of St. Hubert, 1867
- Belgium: Grand Cordon of the Order of Leopold
- (Saxe-Coburg and Gotha) (Duchy of Saxe-Altenburg) (Saxe-Meiningen) Ernestine duchies: Grand Cross of the Saxe-Ernestine House Order, January 1850
- Lippe: Cross of Honour of the House Order of Lippe, 1st Class with Swords
- Mecklenburg: Grand Cross of the Wendish Crown, with Crown in Ore
- Kingdom of Prussia:
  - Knight of the Black Eagle
  - Grand Cross of the Red Eagle
- Saxe-Weimar-Eisenach: Grand Cross of the White Falcon, 29 January 1859
- Kingdom of Saxony: Knight of the Rue Crown, 1859
- Kingdom of Serbia: Grand Cross of the Cross of Takovo
- Württemberg: Grand Cross of the Württemberg Crown, 1864

== Ancestry ==
Ancestors of Heinrich XIV, Prince Reuss Younger Line

8. Count Heinrich XII Reuss of Schleiz
4. Heinrich XLII, Prince Reuss of Schleiz
9. Countess Christine of Erbach-Schönberg
2. Heinrich LXVII, Prince Reuss Younger Line
10. Christian Friedrich Karl, Prince of Hohenlohe-Kirchberg
5. Princess Caroline of Hohenlohe-Kirchberg
11. Princess Luise Charlotte of Hohenlohe-Langenburg
1. Heinrich XIV, Prince Reuss Younger Line
12. Heinrich XXIV, Count Reuss of Ebersdorf
6. Heinrich LI, Prince Reuss of Ebersdorf
13. Countess Karoline Ernestine of Erbach-Schönberg
3. Princess Adelheid Reuss of Ebersdorf
14. Count Gotthelf Adolf of Hoym
7. Count Luise of Hoym
15. Countess Sophie Auguste of Stolberg-Rossla

== Notes and sources ==
- Genealogisches Handbuch des Adels, Fürstliche Häuser, Reference: 1956
- L'Allemagne dynastique, Huberty, Giraud, Magdelaine, Reference: 334

Heinrich XIV, Prince Reuss Younger Line House of Reuss Younger Line Cadet branch of the House of Reuss Born: 28 May 1832 Died: 29 March 1913
Regnal titles
Preceded by Heinrich LXVII	Prince Reuss Younger Line; 1867 – 1913	Succeeded by Heinrich XXVII
New title	Regent of Reuss Elder Line; 1902 – 1913	Succeeded by Heinrich XXVII
