= Breus =

Breus is a surname. Notable people with the surname include:

- Carl Breus (1852–1914), Austrian obstetrician
- Pyotr Breus (1927–2000), Russian water polo player
- Serhiy Breus (born 1983), Ukrainian swimmer
- Yevheniia Breus, Ukrainian wheelchair fencer

== See also ==
- Reus (surname)
