= Pausa, Saxony =

Pausa
- Ortsteil of Pausa-Mühltroff
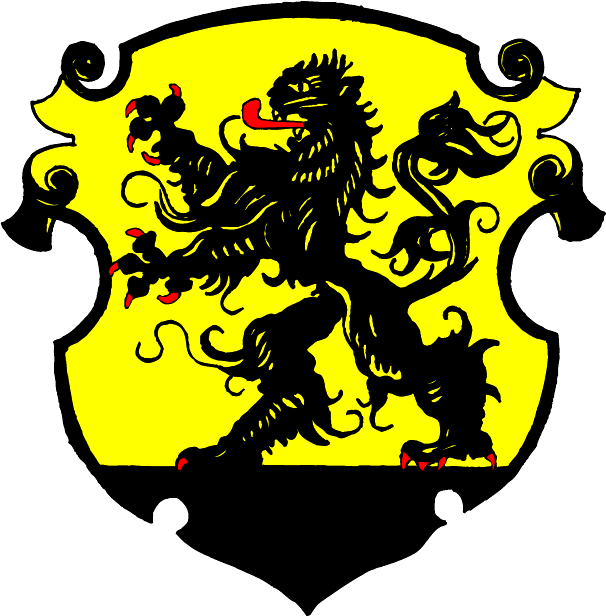
- Coat of arms
- Interactive map of Pausa
- Location within Germany Location within Saxony
- Coordinates: 50°34′50″N 11°59′40″E
- Country: Germany
- State: Saxony
- District: Vogtlandkreis
- Town: Pausa-Mühltroff

Area
  - Total: 36.58 km^{2} (14.12 sq mi)
- Elevation: 470 m (1,540 ft)

Population (2011-12-31)
  - Total: 3,618
  - Density: 98.91/km^{2} (256.2/sq mi)
- Time zone: UTC+01:00 (CET)
  - Summer (DST): UTC+02:00 (CEST)
- Postal codes: 07952
- Dialling codes: 037432
- Vehicle registration: V
- Website: www.stadt-pausa.de

Pausa (German pronunciation: [ˈpaʊza]) is a town in the Vogtlandkreis district, in the Free State of Saxony, Germany. It is situated 13 km east of Schleiz, and 14 km northwest of Plauen. With effect from 1 January 2013, it has merged with Mühltroff under the name of Pausa-Mühltroff.
