= Manfred Schidlowski =

German geologist

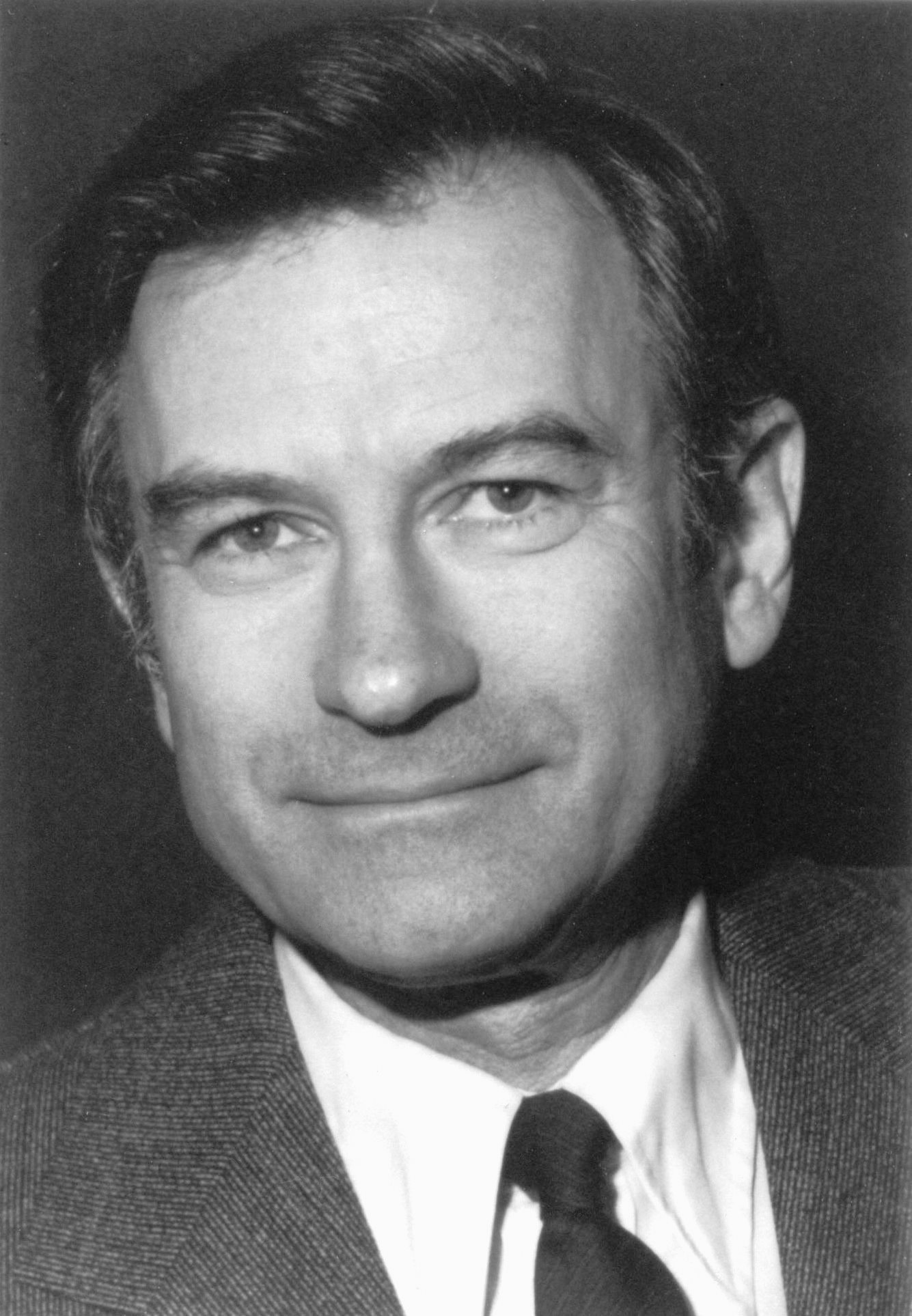
Manfred Schidlowski

Manfred Schidlowski (13 November 1933 – 3 October 2012) was a German Professor of Geochemistry at the Max-Planck-Institut for Chemistry (Otto-Hahn-Institut) in Mainz. His research was concerned with the biochemistry of the Early Earth with a focus on isotope-biogeochemistry and the evidence of the earliest life processes in Precambrian. Schidlowski is considered the founder of this research direction in Germany and he also shaped international research in isotope biogeochemistry of Precambrian sediments for more than two decades.

== Biography and scientific work ==
Manfred Schidlowski was born in Stettin on 13 November 1933. His family left his homeland during the Second World War and moved to Greifswald. From 1952-1955 he studied at the Humboldt University of Berlin, and from 1956 at the Free University of Berlin, where he received his diploma in geology in 1960 and one year later his doctorate with the "Contribution to the Geology of the Eastern Alps between the Small Walser Valley and the Upper Lech (Vorarlberg, Austria)". His desire for a change in geoscientific content led him to South Africa, first as a postdoctoral researcher at the University of Pretoria and then as a mine geologist for the Anglo-Transvaal Consolidated Investment Co. Ltd. at the Loraine Gold Mine to Allanridge in the Orange Free State. In 1962 he met his future wife Ingrid Piegler, a great-great-granddaughter of Heinrich Gottfried Piegler, he married her in 1964.

Scientifically, he worked on the mineralogy of the gold-bearing Witwatersrand sequence. The discovery of detrital, i.e. sedimentary rearranged pyrites and uraninites as well as the frequently occurring carbonaceous material in these layers founded his scientific interest in the early evolution of the Earth and provided the data for his first Nature publication in 1965 with the title "Probable Life-forms from the Precambrian of the Witwatersrand System (South Africa)". In 1963 Schidlowski returned to Germany to work on the ores of the Witwatersrand succession in Paul Ramdohr's group in the Heidelberg. Here the idea of a relationship between the presence of detrital pyrites and the oxygen content of the Earth's atmosphere was born. He spent the years 1965-1967 at the University of Göttingen. Evidence for a biological origin of the carbonaceous material in the Witwatersrand sediments was consolidated during this time by carbon isotope investigations in cooperation with Jochen Hoefs. Afterwards, Schidlowski habilitated at the University of Heidelberg. In 1969 he moved to the newly founded Institute for Air Chemistry at the Max Planck Institute for Chemistry in Mainz in 1969. Its director, Christian Junge, sent him back to South Africa on a large sampling campaign. The focus was on the carbonates of early Earth history as archives of ocean-atmosphere evolution. Among these were carbonates of the Lomagundi succession from Rhodesia (now Zimbabwe) with their unusually positive carbon isotopy. Initially classified as a local feature, it quickly became clear that this was a global phenomenon, one of the most massive changes in global carbon cycle. There is still intense debate about the reasons for this global phenomenon, the basis of which was researched by him. His 1976 publication on this subject (Schidlowski et al., Geochim.Cosmochim. Acta 40: 449-455) is still cited several times in 2012. The move to the Max Planck Institute set the course for Schidlowski's future scientific career: research into the Earth system during the Precambrian. The time in Mainz was interrupted by stays at Harvard University, the University of California Los Angeles and the Weizman Institute in Rehovot, Israel.

From 1979 to 1989, he was chairman of the UNESCO-sponsored IGCP Project 157 (Early Organic Evolution and Mineral and Energy Resources). He established close contacts with geological and geochemical research centres such as the institutes of the Academy of Sciences of the USSR, the Academia Sinica (Lanzhou, Beijing). Since 1996, he was a member of the exobiology science team of the European Space Agency (ESA). He spent his scientific life researching the development of the atmosphere, the ocean and life on the early Earth. He wrote more than 100 scientific papers in journals and book chapters as well as edited special volumes and books on the topic of the early development of the Earth system.

Schidlowski retired in 1998. In 2005 he moved with his wife to Altusried. Here he died on October 3, 2012.

== Publications ==
- Manfred Schidlowski: Search for Morphological and Biogeochemical Vestiges of Fossil Life in Extraterrestrial Settings: Utility of Terrestrial Evidence. In: Horneck G., Baumstark-Khan C. (eds) Astrobiology. Springer, Berlin, Heidelberg 2002, pages 373–386.
- Pitawala, A., Schidlowski, M., Dahanayake, K. et al.: Geochemical and petrological characteristics of Eppawala phosphate deposits, Sri Lanka. In: Miner Deposita, Vol. 38, September 2002, pages 505–515.
- Manfred Schidlowski: Carbon isotopes as biogeochemical recorders of life over 3.8 Ga of Earth history: evolution of a concept. In: Precambrian Research, Vol. 106, Issues 1–2, 1 February 2001, pages 117-134
- Yanan Shen, Manfred Schidlowski: New C isotope stratigraphy from southwest China: Implications for the placement of the Precambrian-Cambrian boundary on the Yangtze Platform and global correlations . In: Geology, Vol. 28, Issue 7, 1 July 2000, pages 623–626.
- B. Nagy, R. Weber, J.C. Guerrero, M. Schidlowski: Developments and Interactions of the Precambrian Atmosphere, Lithosphere and Biosphere. Latest Edition, 1 April 2000.
- Manfred Schidlowski, Stjepko Golubic, Michael M. Kimberley, David M. McKirdy Sr.: Early Organic Evolution - Implications for Mineral and Energy Resources: A Farewell Address to IGCP Project 157. Springer, Berlin, Heidelberg 1992. PDF.
- Manfred Schidlowski: A 3,800-million-year isotopic record of life from carbon in sedimentary rocks. In: Nature 333, 26 May 1988, pages 313–318.
- Manfred Schildlowski: Antiquity and Evolutionary Status of Bacterial Sulfate Reduction: Sulfur Isotope Evidence. In: Limits of Life, 1980, pages 159–171.
- Manfred Schidlowski, Rudolf Eichmann, Christian E. Junge: Precambrian sedimentary carbonates: carbon and oxygen isotope geochemistry and implications for the terrestrial oxygen budget. In: Precambrian Research, Vol 2, Issue 1, February 1975, pages 1-69.
- Manfred Schidlowski: Probable Life-forms from the Precambrian of the Witwatersrand System (South Africa). In: Nature, Vol. 205, 27 February 1965, pages 895–896.
