= Reus (disambiguation) =

Reus is a city and municipality in Catalonia, Spain.

Reus may also refer to:

- Reus (surname), a Dutch, German and Catalan surname
- Reus al Norte, a historic barrio in Montevideo, Uruguay
- Reus (video game), an indie game from Abbey Games
- Research Experiences for Undergraduates (REUs)
- Actus reus ("guilty act"), a criminal law term

Named after the city Reus

- Reus Airport
- CF Reus Deportiu, a football club
- Reus Deportiu, a sports club known for its roller hockey team
- Reus Imperials, an American football team

== See also ==
- Reuss (disambiguation)
- Réis (disambiguation)
- Ríos (disambiguation)
