= Breus' mole =

Disease occurring during pregnancy

- Other names: massive mole
- Specialty: Obstetrics

Breus' mole is a massive, subchorionic, tuberous hematoma formed from maternal blood in the uterus during pregnancy. It was first described by Karl Breus in 1892.

== Cause and pathogenesis ==
It is a rare disease, with an incidence of 1 in 1200 placentas. Women with cardiac problems, disorders of circulation, monosomy, hypertension, and diabetes are predisposed to Breus' mole. The mole is formed as a subchorionic hematoma formed out of the intervillous blood, causing progressive accumulation of a clotting substance called fibrin with increasing gestational age. Evidence from the Southern blot test reveals that 85 % of the clotted material is maternal blood. Breus mole is reported to be found in the placentas of macerated stillborn foetuses, indicating that massive subchorionic hematoma could have been the cause of their demise. A massive Breus' mole can cause disturbances in blood flow in the spiral arteries and might result in intrauterine growth restriction of the foetus.

== Diagnosis ==
Clinically, Breus' mole may be asymptomatic, or may present with signs of decreased blood flow to the foetus such as growth restriction and foetal distress. Postnatally, Breus' mole is found in placental examination following live birth or spontaneous abortion. Breus' mole is diagnosed antenatally by ultrasound, where a thick multilobulated hematoma can be seen beneath the chorion. Occasionally, subchorionic thrombohematoma may later become intraplacental, making its diagnosis difficult. The mole may be echogenic or hypoechoic depending upon the amount of fresh blood present in it. Breus' mole should be differentiated from vesicular mole and missed abortion in an ultrasound examination.

== Prognosis ==
Fetal demise occurs if the circulating blood volume is significantly decreased. The critical factor deciding the prognosis is the site of the hematoma and not the volume. If discovered antenatally, serial USG and/or Doppler scans are indicated to monitor the size of the hematoma and the well-being of the foetus.
