= Mühltroff =

- Ortsteil of Pausa-Mühltroff
- Coat of arms
- Interactive map of Mühltroff
- Location within Germany Location within Saxony
- Coordinates: 50°32′25″N 11°55′40″E
- Country: Germany
- State: Saxony
- District: Vogtlandkreis
- Town: Pausa-Mühltroff

Area
  - Total: 27.70 km^{2} (10.70 sq mi)
- Elevation: 482 m (1,581 ft)

Population (2011-12-31)
  - Total: 1,775
  - Density: 64.08/km^{2} (166.0/sq mi)
- Time zone: UTC+01:00 (CET)
  - Summer (DST): UTC+02:00 (CEST)
- Postal codes: 07919
- Dialling codes: 036645
- Vehicle registration: V
- Website: www.muehltroff.de

Mühltroff (German pronunciation: [ˈmyːlˌtʁɔf]) is a town and a former municipality in the Vogtlandkreis district, in the Free State of Saxony, Germany. It is situated 10 km (6.2 mi) southeast of Schleiz, and 16 km (9.9 mi) northwest of Plauen. With effect from 1 January 2013, it has merged with Pausa under the name of Pausa-Mühltroff.
