= Reuss (surname) =

Reuss or Reuß is a surname. Notable people with the surname include:

- Adolph Reuss (1804–1878), a German herpetologist
- Albert Franz Theodor Reuss (1879–1958), amateur German herpetologist
- Allan Reuss (1915–1988), American musician
- August Emanuel von Reuss (1811–1873), a Bohemian-Austrian geologist and paleontologist
- August Leopold von Reuss (1841–1924), Bohemian-Austrian ophthalmologist
- Édouard Guillaume Eugène Reuss (1804–1891), a theologian
- Heinrich Reuss (disambiguation), the name of many male members of the German noble House of Reuss
- Henry S. Reuss (1912–2002), an American Congressman
- Isabel Reuss (born 1962), a Mexican freestyle swimmer
- Jerry Reuss (born 1949), an American baseball player
- Mark Reuss (born 1963), Global President of General Motors Co.
- Theodor Reuss (1855–1923), German occultist

== See also ==
- Reus (surname)
- Ríos (disambiguation)
- House of Reuss, a former ruling princely dynasty in Germany
