= Heinrich LXVII, Prince Reuss Younger Line =

Heinrich LXVII
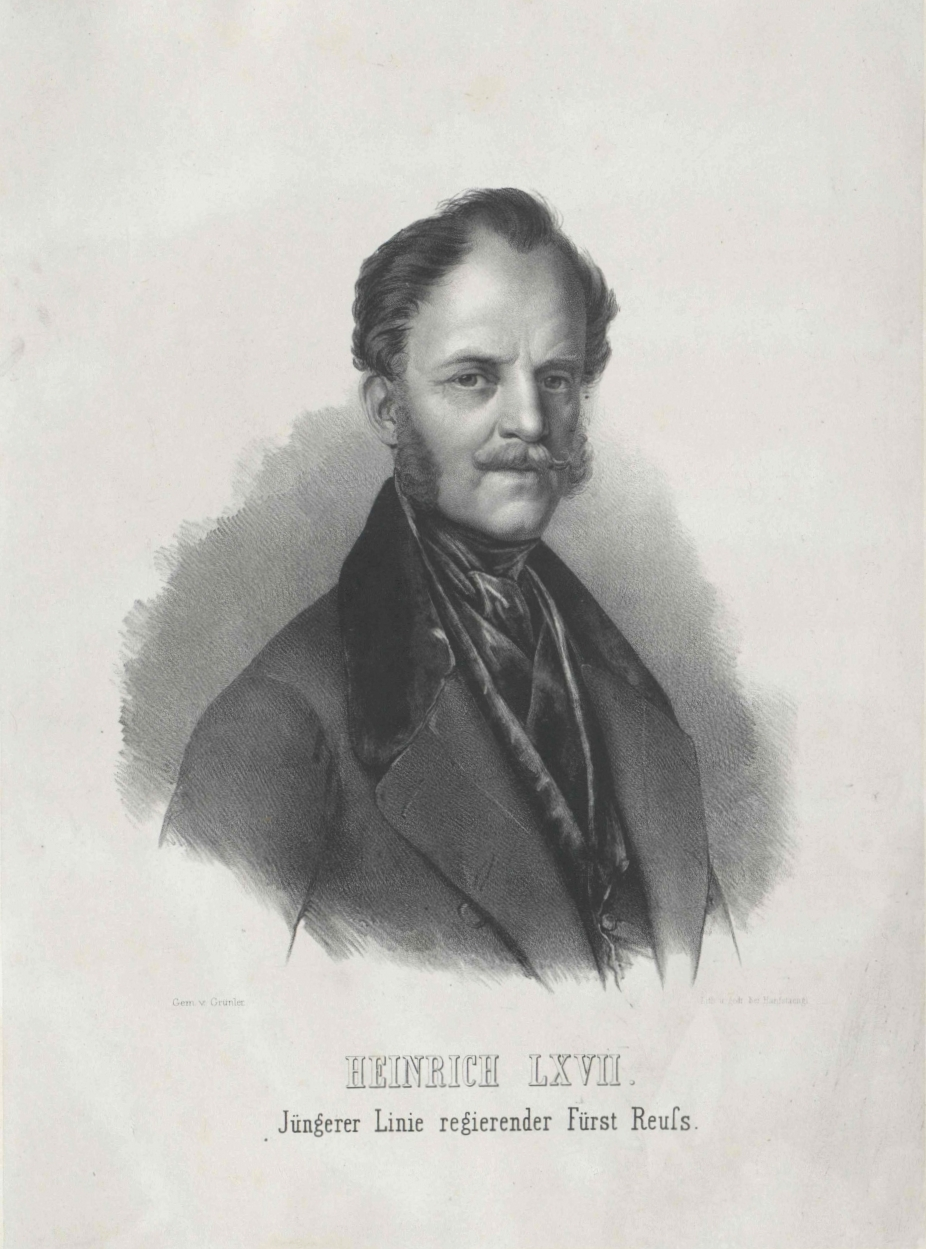

Prince Reuss of Gera
- Reign: 19 June 1854 – 11 July 1867
- Predecessor: Heinrich XLII
- Successor: Heinrich XIV
- Born: 20 October 1789; Schleiz, Reuss
- Died: 11 July 1867 (aged 77); Gera, Reuss Younger Line
- Spouse: Princess Adelheid Reuss of Ebersdorf (m. 1820)
- Issue: Prince Heinrich V; Anna, Princess of Bentheim-Tecklenburg; Princess Elisabeth; Prince Heinrich VIII; Prince Heinrich XI; Heinrich XIV, Prince Reuss Younger Line; Prince Heinrich XVI; Princess Marie
Names
- German: Heinrich
- House: House of Reuss Younger Line
- Father: Heinrich XLII, Prince Reuss Younger Line
- Mother: Princess Caroline of Hohenlohe-Kirchberg

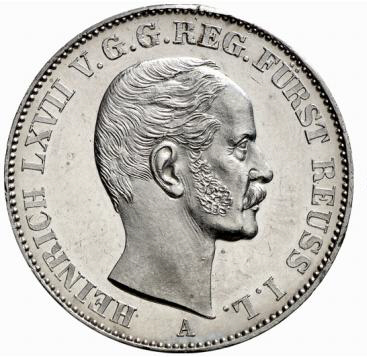
Heinrich LXVII in a coin portrait, 1858

Heinrich LXVII, Prince Reuss Younger Line (German: Heinrich LXVII Fürst Reuß jüngere Linie; 20 October 1789 – 11 July 1867) was Prince Reuss Younger Line from 1854 to 1867.

== Early life ==
Heinrich LXVII was born at Schleiz, Reuss, younger surviving son of Heinrich XLII, Prince Reuss of Schleiz (1752–1818), (son of Count Heinrich XII Reuss of Schleiz, and Countess Christine of Erbach-Schönberg) and his wife, Princess Caroline of Hohenlohe-Kirchberg (1761–1849), (daughter of Christian Friedrich Karl, Prince of Hohenlohe-Kirchberg and Princess Louise Charlotte of Hohenlohe-Langenburg).

== Prince Reuss Younger Line ==
As his brother Heinrich LXII died unmarried and childless, at his death in 1854 he inherited the throne of the Principality.

Under his government appointed Minister Eduard Heinrich-Crispendorf to make funds in 1856 to amend the constitution in the reactionary sense by the parliament. In 1866 he made a treaty with Kingdom of Prussia in the North German Confederation.

He was considered a man of talent, knowledge and business experience and was very popular in his country. As a prince he was a close ally of Prussia. He led after the transfer took place in 1848 the residence of Schleiz to Gera in the years 1859 to 1863 and rebuilt the Osterstein Castle.

Prince Heinrich LXVII founded in October 1857 the Golden and Silver Merit, as a "Civil Cross of Honour".

== Marriage ==
Heinrich LXVII married on 18 April 1820 at Ebersdorf to Princess Adelheid Reuss of Ebersdorf (1800–1880), younger daughter of Heinrich LI, Prince Reuss of Ebersdorf, and his wife, Countess Luise of Hoym.

They had eight children:

- Prince Heinrich V Reuss of Schleiz (4 December 1821 – 22 October 1861)
- Princess Anna Reuss of Schleiz (16 December 1822 – 1 April 1902), married in 1843 to Prince Adolf of Bentheim-Tecklenburg, had issue.
- Princess Elisabeth Reuss of Schleiz (8 June 1824 – 17 December 1833)
- Prince Heinrich VII Reuss of Schleiz (21 January 1827 – 17 February 1828)
- Prince Heinrich XI Reuss of Schleiz (18 November 1828 – 6 March 1830)
- Heinrich XIV, Prince Reuss Younger Line (28 May 1832 – 29 March 1913), married in 1858 to Duchess Agnes of Württemberg, had issue.
- Prince Heinrich XVI Reuss of Schleiz (2 August 1835 – 4 April 1836)
- Princess Marie Reuss of Schleiz (12 April 1837 – 18 May 1840)

== Honours ==
He received the following orders and decorations:

- Kingdom of Prussia:
  - Knight of the Black Eagle
  - Iron Cross (1813)
  - Knight of the Johanniter Order
- Kingdom of Bavaria: Knight of St. Hubert, (1810)
- (Saxe-Coburg and Gotha) (Duchy of Saxe-Altenburg) (Saxe-Meiningen) Ernestine duchies: Grand Cross of the Saxe-Ernestine House Order, (February 1836)
- Saxe-Weimar-Eisenach: Grand Cross of the White Falcon, (9 July 1854)
- Kingdom of Saxony: Knight of the Rue Crown, (1854)
- Belgium: Grand Cordon of the Order of Leopold (civil), (27 July 1856)

== Ancestry ==
Ancestors of Heinrich LXVII, Prince Reuss Younger Line

8. Heinrich XI, Count Reuss of Schleiz
4. Count Heinrich XII Reuss of Schleiz
9. Countess Auguste Dorothea of Hohenlohe-Langenburg
2. Heinrich XLII, Prince Reuss of Schleiz
10. Georg August, Count of Erbach-Schönberg
5. Countess Christine of Erbach-Schönberg
11. Countess Ferdinande Henriette of Stolberg-Gedern
1. Heinrich LXVII, Prince Reuss Younger Line
12. Karl August, Prince of Hohenlohe-Kirchberg
6. Christian Friedrich Karl, Prince of Hohenlohe-Kirchberg
13. Countess Charlotta Amalia of Wolfstein
3. Princess Caroline of Hohenlohe-Kirchberg
14. Louis, Prince of Hohenlohe-Langenburg
7. Princess Luise Charlotte of Hohenlohe-Langenburg
15. Countess Eleonore of Nassau-Saarbrücken

Heinrich LXVII, Prince Reuss Younger Line House of Reuss Younger Line Cadet branch of the House of Reuss Born: 20 October 1789 Died: 11 July 1867
Regnal titles
Preceded by Heinrich LXII	Prince Reuss Younger Line; 1854 – 1867	Succeeded by Heinrich XIV
