= Crispendorf =

- Ortsteil of Schleiz
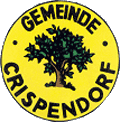
- Coat of arms
- Interactive map of Crispendorf
- Location within Germany Location within Thuringia
- Coordinates: 50°36′N 11°44′E
- Country: Germany
- State: Thuringia
- District: Saale-Orla-Kreis
- Town: Schleiz

Area
  - Total: 11.41 km^{2} (4.41 sq mi)
- Elevation: 430 m (1,410 ft)

Population (2017-12-31)
  - Total: 378
  - Density: 33.1/km^{2} (85.8/sq mi)
- Time zone: UTC+01:00 (CET)
  - Summer (DST): UTC+02:00 (CEST)
- Postal codes: 07924
- Dialling codes: 03663

Crispendorf (German pronunciation: [ˈkʁɪspn̩ˌdɔʁf]) is a village and a former municipality in the district Saale-Orla-Kreis, in Thuringia, Germany. Since 1 January 2019, it is part of the town Schleiz.
