= Carl Breus =

Austrian obstetrician

Carl Breus (12 April 1852 – 1914) was an Austrian obstetrician born in Vienna.

He studied medicine at the University of Vienna, earning his doctorate in 1876. Afterwards he was an assistant at the Vienna Maternity Clinic, and in 1883 received his habilitation.

In 1892 he described a rare condition now known as "Breus' mole", defined as a massive subchorionic hematoma of the placenta that takes place in a stillbirth. He is credited with the design of an obstetrical forceps (Breus' forceps) that was once widely used in German hospitals.

== Selected publications ==
- Zur Statistik der Behandlung der puerperalen Eklampsie mit heissen Bädern (1884) – Statistics on the treatment of puerperal eclampsia with hot baths.
- Das Tuberose Subchoriale Hämatom der Decidua (1892) – The tuberous subchoriale hematoma of the decidua.
- Die Behandlung des Nabelschnurbruches (1893) – Treatment of the umbilical hernia.
- Über wahre Epithel führende Cystenbildung in Uterusmyomen (1894) – About true epithelial cyst formation leading to uterine fibroids.
- Die pathologische Beckenformen (with Alexander Kolisko, 1904 – Pathological pelvic shapes.
