= Alexander Kolisko =

Austrian pathologist

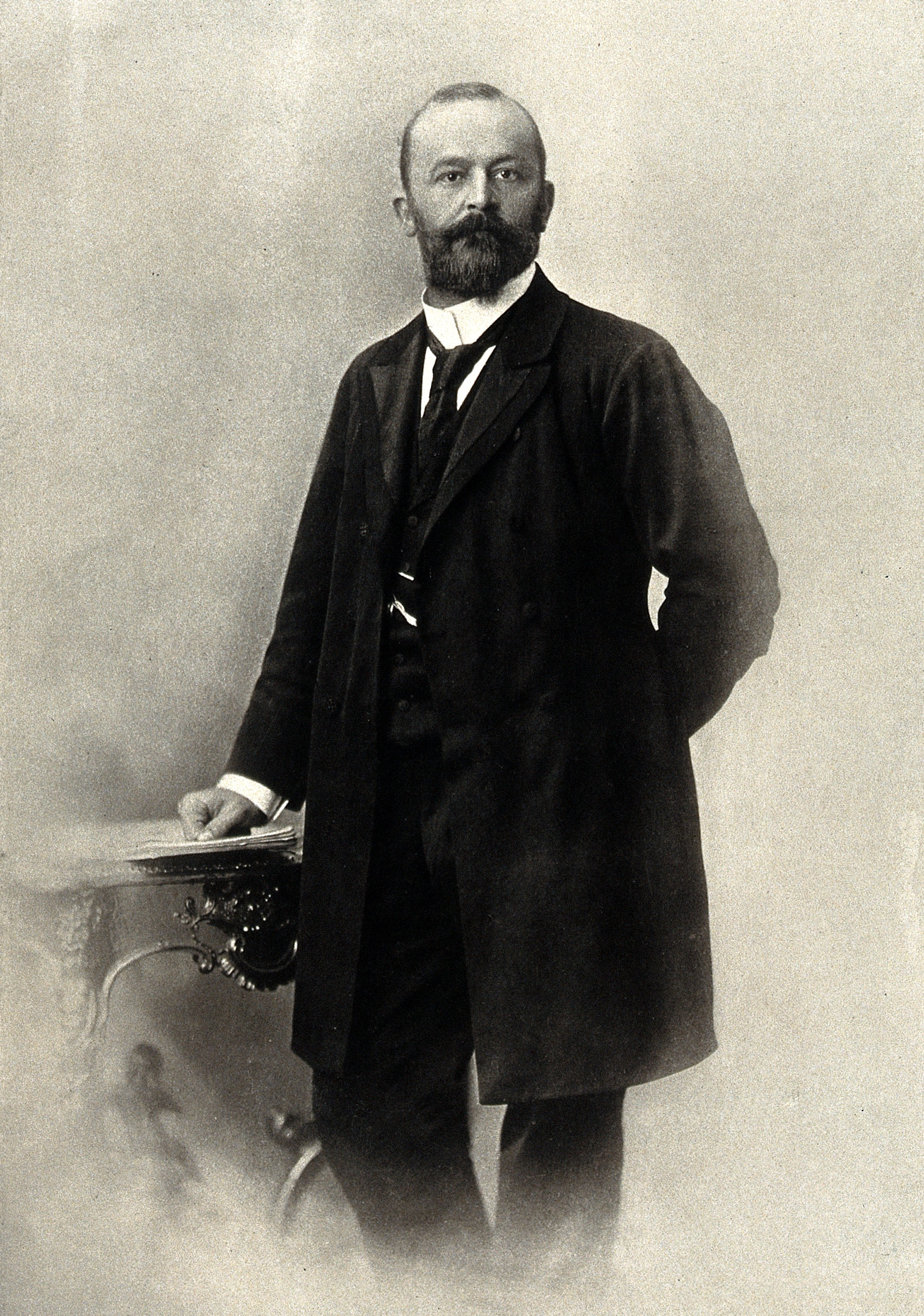
Alexander Kolisko

Alexander Kolisko (6 November 1857 – 23 February 1918) was a pathologist who was born in Vienna, Austrian Empire. He was the father of anthroposophist Eugen Kolisko (1893–1939).

== Biography ==
In 1881 Kolisko earned his medical doctorate from the University of Vienna, subsequently working as an assistant to Hans Kundrat (1845–1893) at the pathological anatomy institute at the university. Later, he was a prosector at the Leopoldstädter Kinderspital in Vienna. In 1898 he succeeded Eduard von Hofmann (1837–1897) as a professor of forensic medicine, and in 1916 was successor to Anton Weichselbaum (1845–1920) as professor of pathological anatomy at the University of Vienna.

He died in Vienna.

Kolisko is remembered for his work in forensic pathology. He was particularly interested in the pathology of sudden death, leaving the criminal and legal aspects of the subject to his assistant Albin Haberda (1868–1933). Also, he conducted extensive studies involving the effects of carbon monoxide poisoning on the brain, and with obstetrician Carl Breus (1852–1914), he developed a classification system for pelvic disorders.

== Selected writings ==
- Schemata zum Einzeichnen von Gehirnbefunden, Leipzig and Vienna, Verlag Deuticke, 1895 (with Emil Redlich 1866–1930).
- Beiträge zur Kenntnis der osteo myelitis, Vienna, 1896.
- Die pathologischen Beckenformen, Leipzig, 1904 (with Carl Breus 1852–1914).
