= Heinrich XLII, Prince Reuss-Schleiz und Gera =

Prussian prince

Heinrich XLII
- Born: 27 February 1752; Löhma, Reuss
- Died: 17 April 1818 (aged 66); Schleiz, Reuss Younger Line
- Spouse: Princess Caroline of Hohenlohe-Kirchberg (m. 1779)
- Issue: Heinrich LXII, Prince Reuss Younger Line; Heinrich LXVII, Prince Reuss Younger Line
Names
- German: Heinrich
- House: House of Reuss Younger Line
- Father: Heinrich XII of Reuss-Schleiz
- Mother: Countess Christine of Erbach-Schönberg

Heinrich XLII (German: Heinrich XLII Fürst Reuß zu Schleiz und Gera; 27 February 1752 – 17 April 1818) was a German prince of the House of Reuss.

== Biography ==
He succeeded as Count of Reuss-Schleiz on 25 June 1784, and also to Reuss-Gera on 26 April 1802, when the counties were united as Reuss-Schleiz und Gera. On 9 April 1806, the united county was raised to a principality.

German nobility
Preceded by Heinrich XII	Count of Reuss-Schleiz; 1784–1802	Succeeded by United with Reuss-Gera
Preceded by Himself (Reuss-Schleiz); Heinrich XXX (Reuss-Gera)	Count of Reuss-Schleiz und Gera; 1802–1806	Succeeded by Raised to principality
Preceded by New creation	Prince of Reuss-Schleiz und Gera; 1806–1818	Succeeded by Heinrich LXII
