= Eugen Kolisko =

Austrian-German physician (1893–1939)

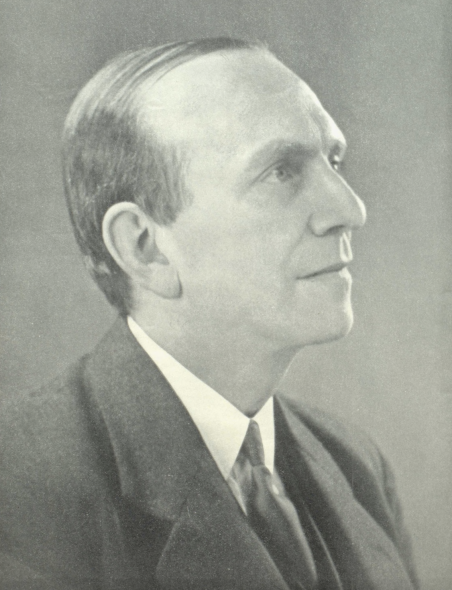
Eugen Kolisko

Eugen Kolisko (21 March 1893 – 29 November 1939) was an Austrian-German physician and educator who was born in Vienna. He studied medicine at the University of Vienna, and in 1917 became a lecturer of medical chemistry. He was the son of pathologist Alexander Kolisko (1857-1918).

Eugen Kolisko is remembered for his pioneer work in anthroposophy. He was introduced to anthroposophy through his classmate, Walter Johannes Stein (1891-1957). In 1914, he first attended lectures given by Rudolf Steiner, the founder of anthroposophy. Consequently, he became a member of the Anthroposophical Society, and in 1920 was invited as an instructor to the newly established Waldorf School at Stuttgart by Emil Molt (1876-1936).

Kolisko specialized in preventative medicine, and at the Waldorf School he worked with other teachers in creating a curriculum that focused on the spiritual and physical development of school children. He was instrumental in construction of several artistic therapies, such as anthroposophic music therapy and eurythmy. During the 1930s, he left the Waldorf School in Stuttgart for political reasons, relocating to England in 1936, where he undertook the establishment of a private educational institute. Kolisko died of cardiac failure outside London on 29 November 1939.

His wife, Lili Kolisko (1893-1976), introduced a concept known as Steigbildmethode (capillary dynamolysis method), which dealt with Bildschaffenden methods for assessment of food quality from an anthroposophic standpoint. Today, the "Kolisko Conferences" are a series of international conferences of teachers, physicians, therapists and parents who meet in order to further the concepts and philosophy of a Waldorf education.

Eugen Kolisko was the author of numerous written works, published both in German and English; the following are a few of his better known English publications:

- "The Human Organism in the Light of Anthroposophy"
- "Lead and the Human Organism"
- "Nutrition and Agriculture"
- "The Threefold Human Organism: A Series of Lectures"
- "Three Fundamental Problems of the Anthroposophical Knowledge of Man I. the Bodily Foundation of Thinking"
- "Reincarnation and Other Essays"
- "The Classification of the Animal Kingdom Articles in the Present Age', Vol. 1, Nos. 2 & 3"
- "Zoology for everybody : a series of lectures"
- "Nutrition: a Series of Lectures: 1 - the Transformation of Matter"
