= Pausa-Mühltroff =

- Town
- Location of Pausa-Mühltroff within Vogtlandkreis district
- Interactive map of Pausa-Mühltroff
- Location within Germany Location within Saxony
- Coordinates: 50°34′N 11°58′E
- Country: Germany
- State: Saxony
- District: Vogtlandkreis
- Subdivisions: 7

Government
  - Mayor (2019–26): Michael Pohl (CDU)

Area
  - Total: 64.13 km^{2} (24.76 sq mi)
- Elevation: 470 m (1,540 ft)

Population (2025-12-31)
  - Total: 4,556
  - Density: 71.04/km^{2} (184.0/sq mi)
- Time zone: UTC+01:00 (CET)
  - Summer (DST): UTC+02:00 (CEST)
- Postal codes: 07952
- Dialling codes: 037432
- Vehicle registration: V, AE, OVL, PL, RC
- Website: www.stadt-pausa.de

Pausa-Mühltroff (German pronunciation: [ˈpaʊza ˈmyːlˌtʁɔf]) is a town in the Vogtlandkreis district in Saxony, Germany, created with effect from 1 January 2013 by the merger of the towns of Pausa and Mühltroff.

== Constituent communities ==
Incorporated villages are:

- Ebersgrün
- Kornbach
- Langenbach
- Linda
- Mühltroff
- Pausa with Oberreichenau
- Ranspach
- Thierbach
- Unterreichenau
- Wallengrün
