= Heinrich LXII, Prince Reuss Younger Line =

Heinrich LXII
- Prince Reuss Younger Line
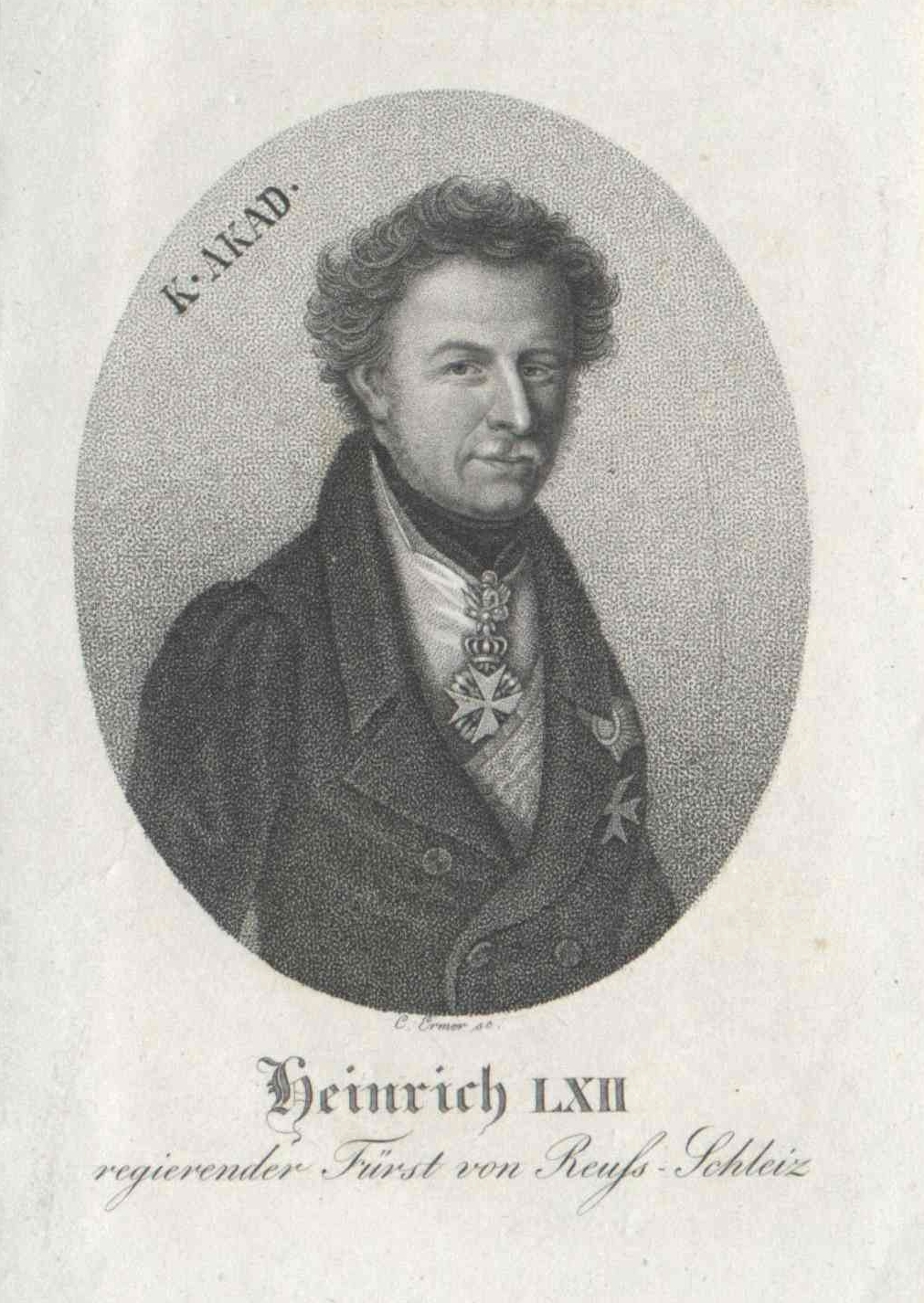
- Born: 31 May 1785; Schleiz, Reuss
- Died: 19 June 1854 (aged 69); Schleiz, Reuss Younger Line
Names
- German: Heinrich
- House: House of Reuss Younger Line
- Father: Heinrich XLII, Prince Reuss-Schleiz und Gera
- Mother: Princess Caroline of Hohenlohe-Kirchberg

Heinrich LXII, Prince Reuss Younger Line (German: Heinrich LXII Fürst Reuß jüngere Linie; 31 May 1785 – 19 June 1854) was the first Prince Reuss Younger Line from 1848 to 1854, also called Reuss Junior Line and Prince of Reuss-Gera.

== Early life ==
Heinrich LXII was born at Schleiz, Reuss, the eldest surviving son of Heinrich XLII, Prince Reuss of Schleiz, son of Count Heinrich XII Reuss of Schleiz, and Countess Christine of Erbach-Schönberg, and his wife, Princess Caroline of Hohenlohe-Kirchberg, daughter of Christian Friedrich Karl, Prince of Hohenlohe-Kirchberg and Princess Louise Charlotte of Hohenlohe-Langenburg.

== Prince Reuss Younger Line ==
After the abdication of Heinrich LXXII, Prince Reuss of Lobenstein and Ebersdorf in October 1848, due to civil unrest in connection with the revolutions that spread through Germany, Heinrich LXII unified the principalities of Reuss-Schleiz, Reuss-Gera, Reuss-Lobenstein and Reuss-Ebersdorf, and became part of the Principality of Reuss Younger Line. Under his government, the country received in 1849 a modern constitution. In 1851, the first constitutional parliament and in 1852 was a revised the state constitution, together with a new electoral law adopted by indirect elections.

Heinrich LXII died unmarried and had no children. At his death, the throne of the Principality passed to his younger brother Heinrich LXVII.

== Ancestry ==
Ancestors of Heinrich LXII, Prince Reuss Younger Line

8. Heinrich XI, Count Reuss of Schleiz
4. Count Heinrich XII Reuss of Schleiz
9. Countess Auguste Dorothea of Hohenlohe-Langenburg
2. Heinrich XLII, Prince Reuss of Schleiz
10. George August, Count of Erbach-Schönberg
5. Countess Christine of Erbach-Schönberg
11. Countess Ferdinande Henriette of Stolberg-Gedern
1. Heinrich LXII, Prince Reuss Younger Line
12. Karl August, Prince of Hohenlohe-Kirchberg
6. Christian Friedrich Karl, Prince of Hohenlohe-Kirchberg
13. Countess Charlotta Amalia of Wolfstein
3. Princess Caroline of Hohenlohe-Kirchberg
14. Louis, Prince of Hohenlohe-Langenburg
7. Princess Luise Charlotte of Hohenlohe-Langenburg
15. Countess Eleonore of Nassau-Saarbrücken

== Notes and sources ==
- Europäische Stammtafeln, Band I, Frank Baron Freytag von Loringhoven, 1975, Isenburg, W. K. Prinz von, Reference: Page 170
- L'Allemagne dynastique, Huberty, Giraud, Magdelaine, Reference: I 322

Heinrich LXII, Prince Reuss Younger Line House of Reuss Younger Line Cadet branch of the House of Reuss Born: 31 May 1785 Died: 19 May 1854
Regnal titles
New title	Prince Reuss Younger Line; 1848 – 1854	Succeeded by Heinrich LXVII
