= Reus (surname) =

Reus is a Dutch (IPA: [røːs]), German (IPA: [ˈʁɔʏs]) and Catalan (IPA: [ˈrɛws]) surname. (De) reus means "(the) giant" in middle and modern Dutch, and the surname has a descriptive origin. In Germany, the name may have its origin in the Middle Low German word ruse for a fish trap, or from a regional term reuse for a small stream or channel. People with this surname include:

- Christian Reus-Smit (born 1961), Australian international relations scholar
- Francisco Reus-Froylan (1919–2008), Puerto Rican Episcopalian Bishop
- Hendrik Reus (1872–19350, Dutch architect
- Hesterine de Reus (born 1961), Dutch football player and coach
- Johann Baptist Reus (1868–1947), German Jesuit priest, missionary and theologian in Brazil
- Julian Reus (born 1988), German sprinter
- Kai Reus (born 1985), Dutch cyclist
- Marco Reus (born 1989), German football forward
- Patrick de Reus (born 1969), Dutch volleyball player
- Ruben Reus (born 1984), Dutch figure skater
- Timo Reus (born 1974), German football goalkeeper

Two brothers "Sastre Reus" from Mallorca:

- Luis Sastre Reus (born 1986), Spanish football midfielder
- Rafel Sastre Reus (born 1975), Spanish football defender

== See also ==
- Reuss (surname)
- Reus
- Ríos (disambiguation)
