= Schleiz =

- Town
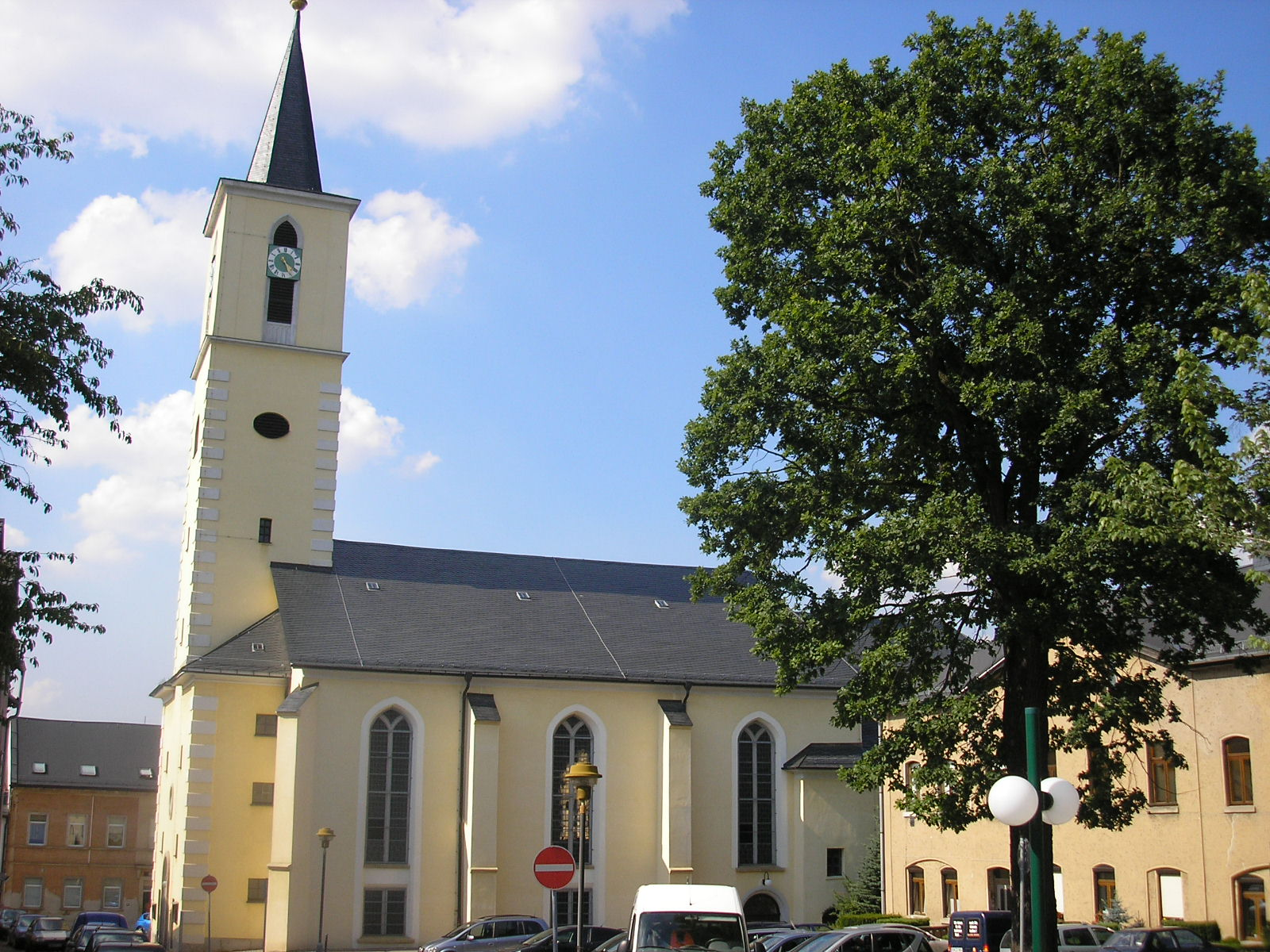
- Church in Schleiz

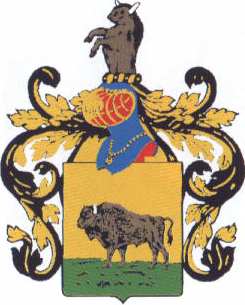
- Coat of arms

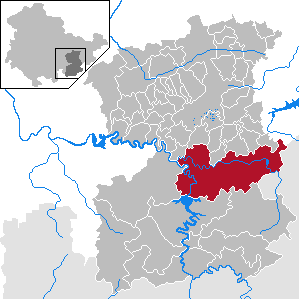
- Location of Schleiz within Saale-Orla-Kreis district
- Interactive map of Schleiz
- Location within Germany Location within Thuringia
- Coordinates: 50°35′N 11°49′E
- Country: Germany
- State: Thuringia
- District: Saale-Orla-Kreis
- Subdivisions: 15

Government
  - Mayor (2024–30): Marko Bias (CDU)

Area
  - Total: 108.21 km^{2} (41.78 sq mi)
- Elevation: 432 m (1,417 ft)

Population (2025-12-31)
  - Total: 8,501
  - Density: 78.56/km^{2} (203.5/sq mi)
- Time zone: UTC+01:00 (CET)
  - Summer (DST): UTC+02:00 (CEST)
- Postal codes: 07901–07907
- Dialling codes: 03663
- Vehicle registration: SOK
- Website: www.schleiz.de

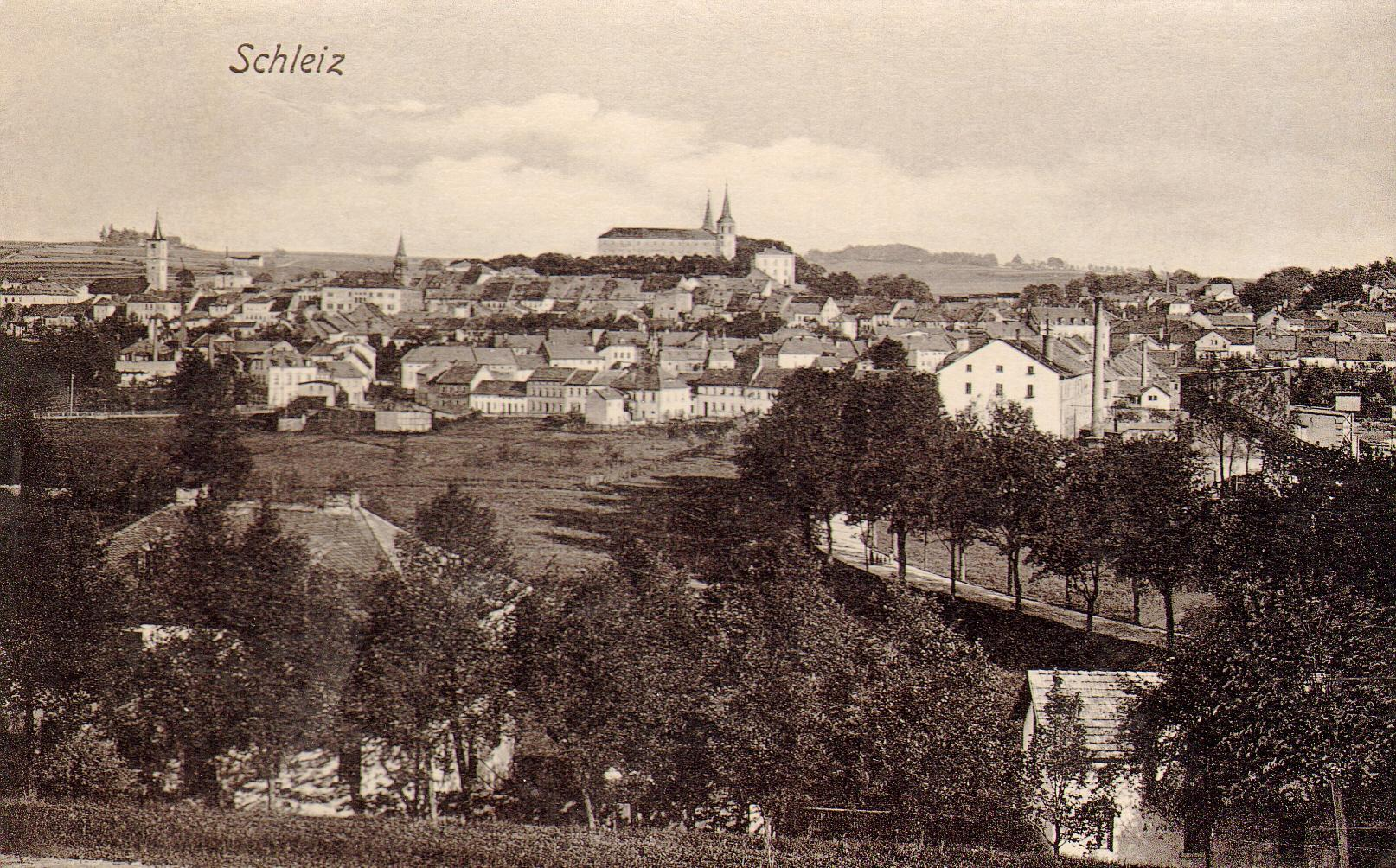
Postcard picture of Schleiz in 1908

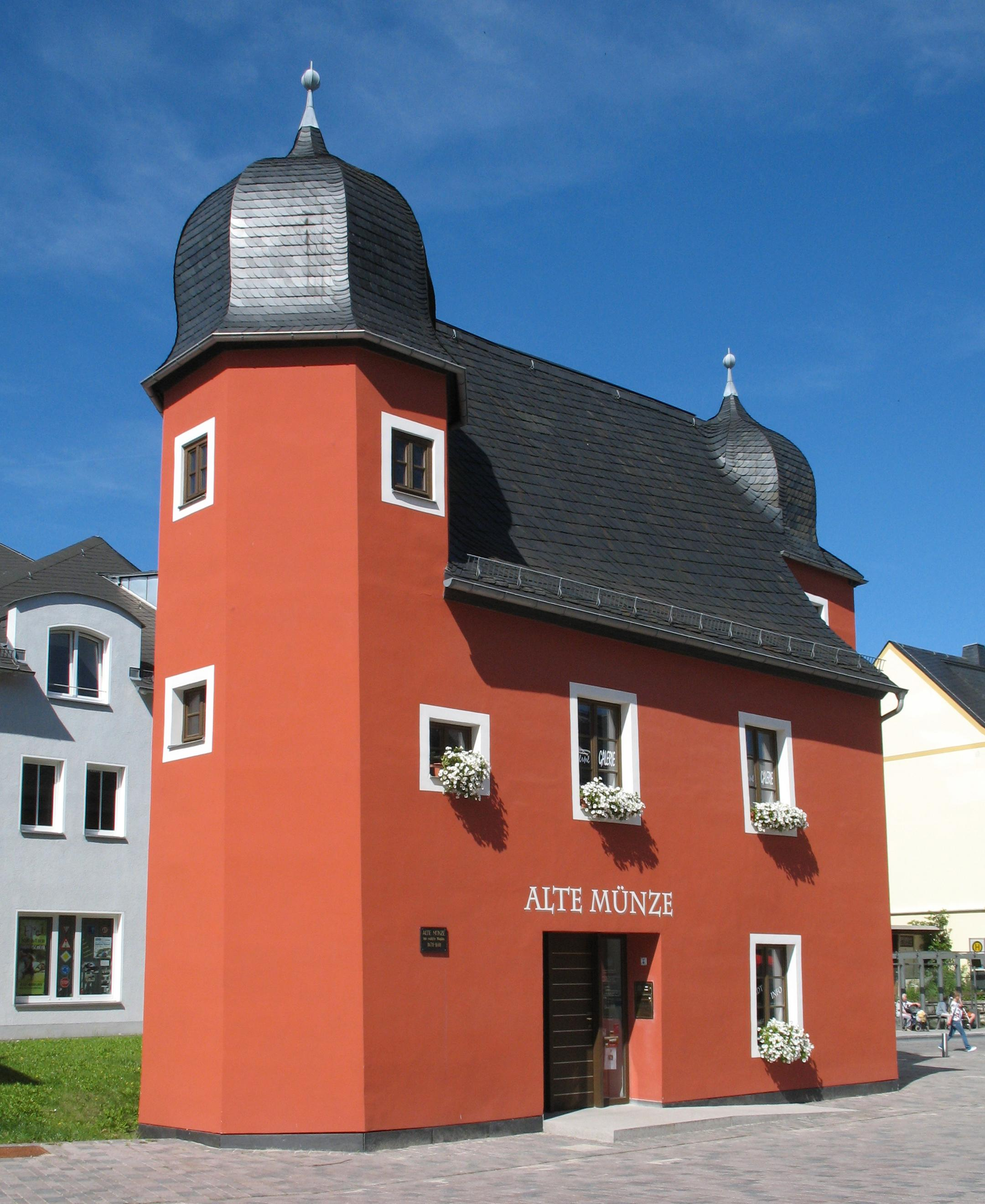
Former mint building (called "Alte Münze"-"Old Mint")

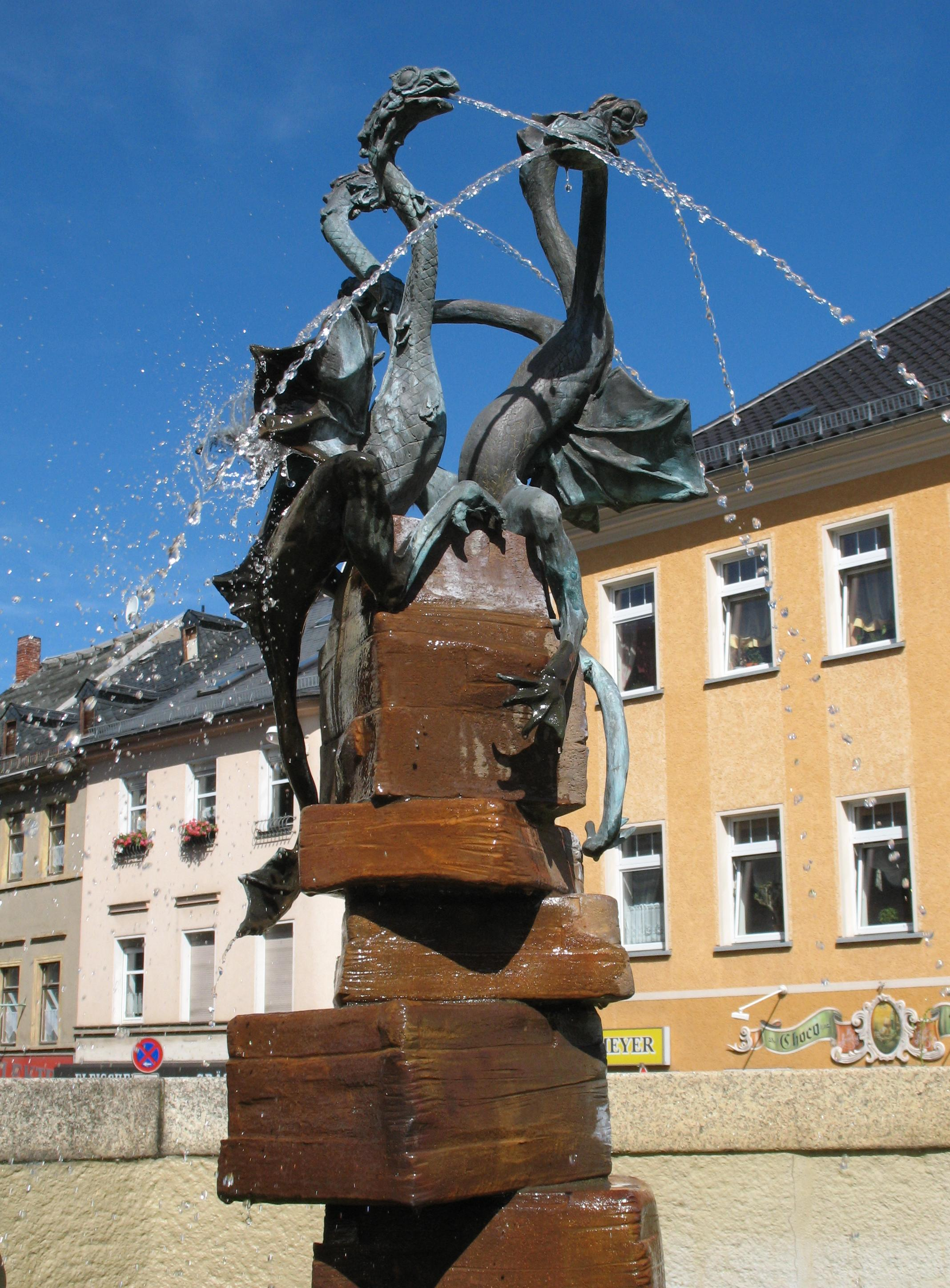
Dragon fountain

Schleiz (German pronunciation: [ˈʃlaɪts]) is a town in the district of Saale-Orla-Kreis in Thuringia, Germany. The former municipality Crispendorf was merged into Schleiz in January 2019, and Burgk in December 2019.

== Location ==
Schleiz is in the Thuringian Vogtland area, an area of wooded hills on the borders of Thuringia, Saxony, Bavaria and the Czech Republic. The city is located in a valley with the river Wisenta near the motorway A 9 (Berlin–Munich).

=== Neighboring parishes ===
Crispendorf (6 km)	Görkwitz (2 km)	Oettersdorf (3 km)	Löhma (5 km)	Kirschkau (6 km)	Zeulenroda-Triebes (14 km)
Remptendorf (12 km)		Pausa (13 km)
	Saalburg-Ebersdorf (12 km)	Tanna (10 km)	Mühltroff (9 km)

Distances calculated as between town centers.

=== Subdivisions ===
Schleiz includes the following subdivisions:

- Möschlitz
- Grochwitz
- Oberböhmsdorf
- Lössau
- Langenbuch
- Wüstendittersdorf
- Dröswein
- Gräfenwarth
- Oschitz
- Heinrichsruh
- Crispendorf
- Burgk

== History ==
Schleiz can be traced back to a settlement established about 1200 ("Altstadt") and a separate "Neustadt" that was established next to it. The "Neustadt" had a castle and a city wall. Until 2 December 1482 they were totally separate communities after which they combined to one city. There was a settlement of the Teutonic Order here, and for some years previous to 1848 the town was the capital of the small principality of Reuss-Schleiz. In the vicinity a battle was fought, between the French and the Prussians on 9 October 1806.

Within the German Empire (1871-1918), Schleiz was part of the Principality of Reuss-Gera.

=== 20th Century ===
During World War II hundreds of women and men from several nations, including the Soviet Union were transported to Schleiz as forced laborers. At least 60 of them died there.

The palace was destroyed April 1945.

== Climate ==
Climate data for Schleiz (1991–2020 normals)
Month	Jan	Feb	Mar	Apr	May	Jun	Jul	Aug	Sep	Oct	Nov	Dec	Year
Mean daily maximum °C (°F)	1.6 (34.9)	3.2 (37.8)	7.2 (45.0)	12.9 (55.2)	16.7 (62.1)	20.5 (68.9)	23.0 (73.4)	22.5 (72.5)	17.7 (63.9)	12.3 (54.1)	6.1 (43.0)	2.8 (37.0)	12.2 (54.0)
Daily mean °C (°F)	−0.7 (30.7)	0.2 (32.4)	3.4 (38.1)	8.0 (46.4)	12.0 (53.6)	15.4 (59.7)	17.6 (63.7)	17.4 (63.3)	13.2 (55.8)	8.6 (47.5)	3.5 (38.3)	0.8 (33.4)	8.4 (47.1)
Mean daily minimum °C (°F)	−3.1 (26.4)	−2.6 (27.3)	−0.1 (31.8)	3.1 (37.6)	6.8 (44.2)	10.5 (50.9)	12.5 (54.5)	12.2 (54.0)	9.0 (48.2)	5.4 (41.7)	1.2 (34.2)	−1.6 (29.1)	4.4 (39.9)
Average precipitation mm (inches)	32.9 (1.30)	30.0 (1.18)	40.0 (1.57)	39.4 (1.55)	64.6 (2.54)	73.7 (2.90)	89.9 (3.54)	72.3 (2.85)	58.2 (2.29)	46.0 (1.81)	43.0 (1.69)	43.0 (1.69)	649.8 (25.58)
Average precipitation days (≥ 1.0 mm)	16.9	15.2	17.1	13.3	14.8	14.2	15.2	14.3	12.7	14.3	14.9	18.0	183.6
Average relative humidity (%)	87.4	83.2	79.3	72.0	72.6	73.5	71.9	71.7	77.7	84.4	89.2	88.5	79.3
Mean monthly sunshine hours	57.4	78.1	121.2	180.8	205.6	205.0	219.6	210.4	160.6	110.1	58.5	47.9	1,673.8
Source: World Meteorological Organization

== Population ==
Trend of population figures:

1834 — 1995

- 1834 - 4619
- 1890 - 4928
- 1933 - 6505
- 1939 - 6828
- 1960 - 7933
- 1994 - 8567
- 1995 - 9163

1996 — 2002

- 1996 - 9528
- 1997 - 9375
- 1998 - 9389
- 1999 - 9336
- 2000 - 9309
- 2001 - 9268
- 2002 - 9223

2003 — 2009

- 2003 - 9100
- 2004 - 9069
- 2005 - 9012
- 2006 - 8932
- 2007 - 8868
- 2008 - 8824
- 2009 - 8717

== Recreation ==
Schleiz is also the site of the Schleizer Dreieck, a temporary road course that has hosted motor races since 2023.

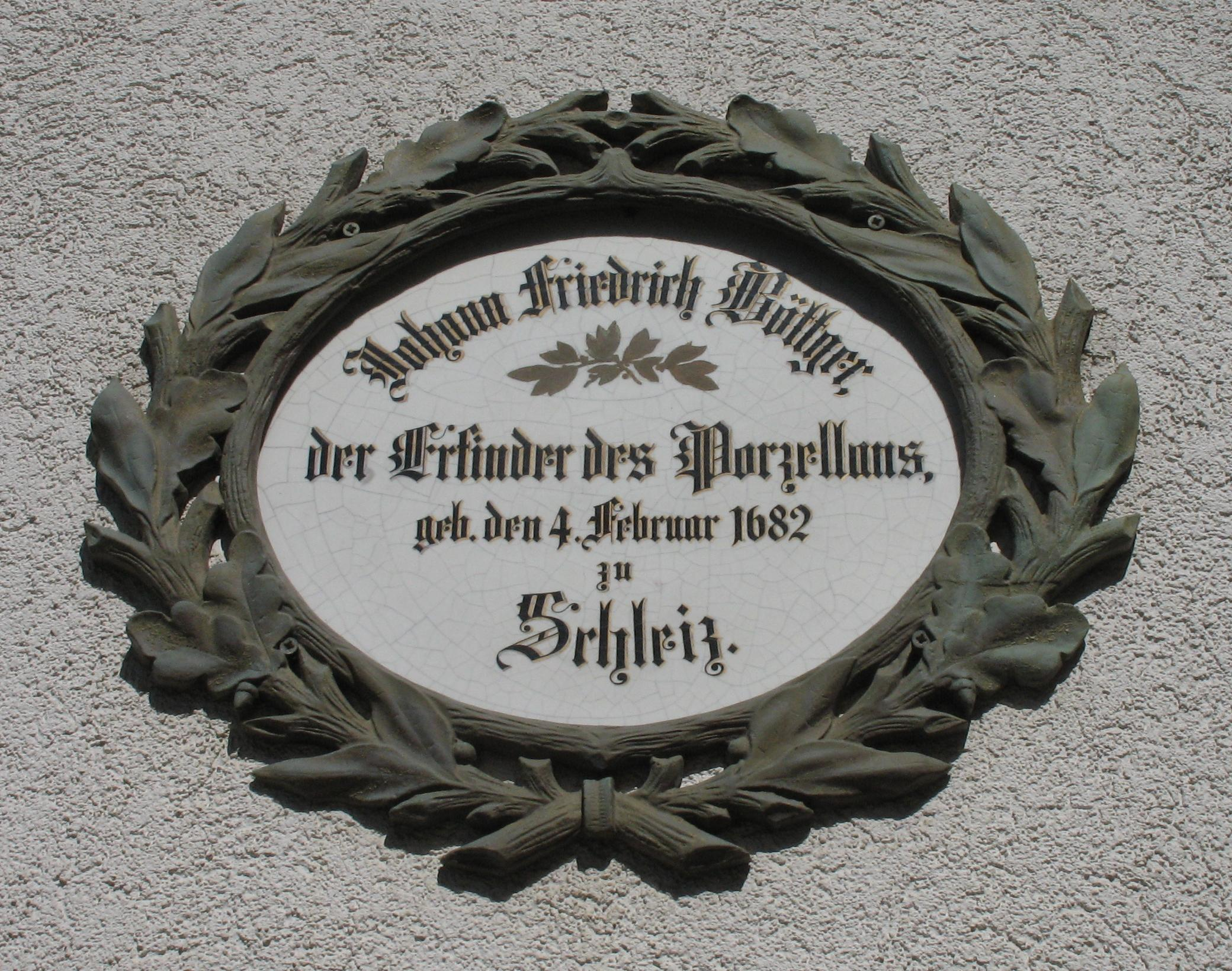
Commemorative plaque for Johann Friedrich Böttger

== Notable people ==
- Johann Friedrich Böttger (1682–1719), alchemist and co-inventor of European porcelain
- Heinrich Gottfried Piegler (1797–1849), probably the largest manufacturer of Döbereiner's lamps
- Richard Barthold (1855-1932), US-american politician
- Kurt Holzschuher (1873-1945), owner of the oldest factory in Schleiz (Gebr. Holzschuher) and German politician (DVP)
- Theodor Piegler (1904-1991), great-grandson of H.G. Piegler, co-owner of the internationally active metal goods factory for hairdressing articles "Gebr. Piegler" in Nuremberg
- Joachim Blechschmidt (1912-1943), German pilot and fighter ace in World War II
- Bernhard Klee (1936–2025), conductor
- Juergen K. Klimpke (born 1963), mayor of the city of Schleiz from 2012-2018, member of political committees of the city of Schleiz, author ("Schleizer Heimathefte"), founding member and longtime chairman of the "Geschichts- und Heimatverein zu Schleiz e.V." and photographer
- Christian Herrgott (born 1983), politician
