= Heinrich LXXII, Prince Reuss of Lobenstein and Ebersdorf =

Prince of Reuss-Lobenstein and Reuss-Ebersdorf

Heinrich LXXII
- Prince Reuss of Lobenstein and Ebersdorf
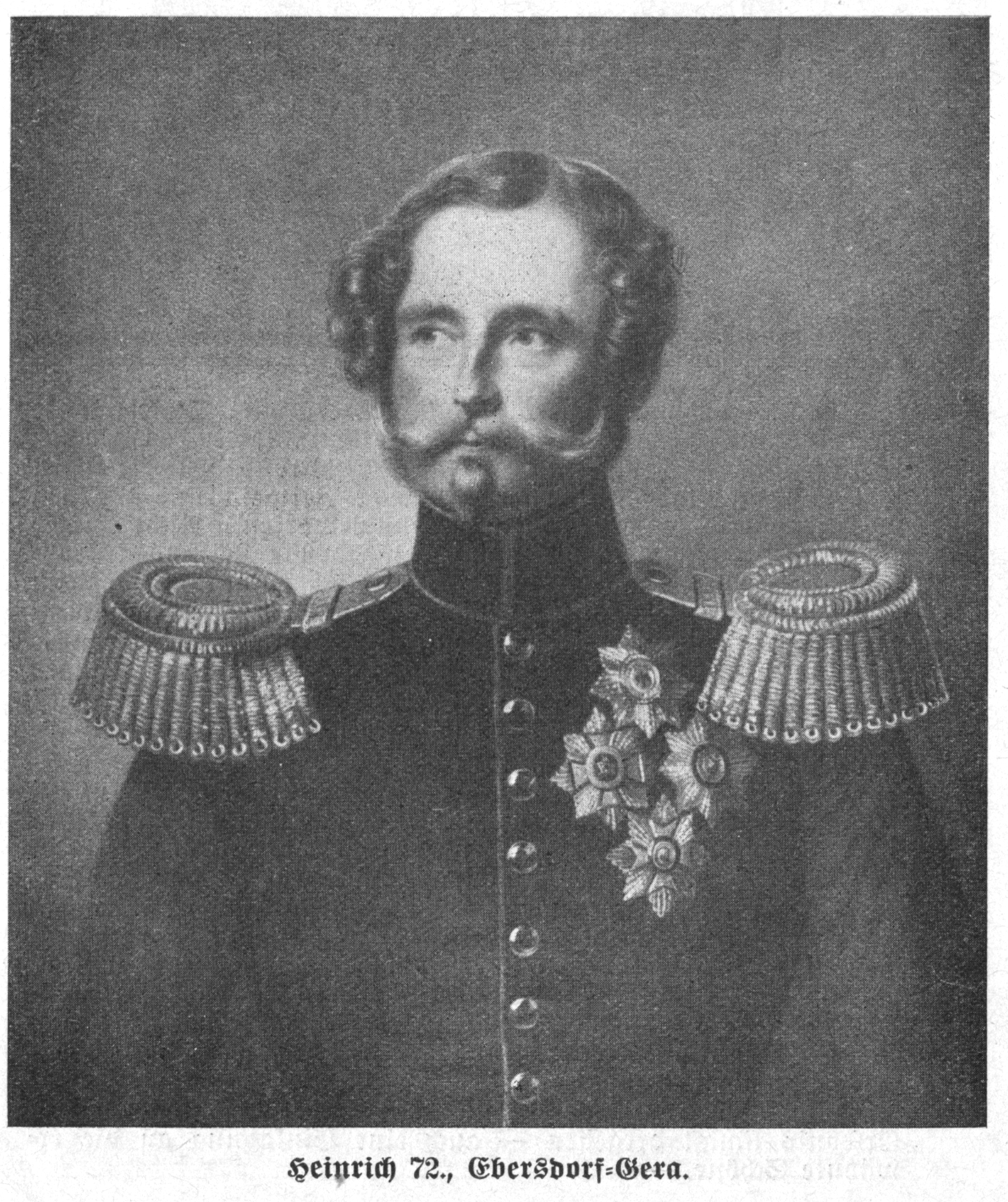
- Heinrich LXXII, unknown date
- Reign: 7 May 1824 – 1 October 1848
- Born: March 27, 1797
- Died: February 17, 1853 (aged 55)
- House: Reuss Younger Line

Heinrich LXXII, Prince Reuss of Lobenstein and Ebersdorf (27 March 1797 – 17 February 1853) was the ruling prince of Reuss-Lobenstein from 7 May 1824 until his abdication on 1 October 1848, and of Reuss-Ebersdorf from 1822 to 1848. He was a cousin of King Leopold I of Belgium.

Unlike with most European monarchies, his large regnal number does not indicate that he was preceded by 71 previous rulers also named Heinrich. By tradition, all male members of the House of Reuss are named Heinrich, and are numbered by order of birth within the family in general. In the Reuss Younger Line, the numbering system was reset at the beginning of each century; thus Heinrich LXXII's high regnal number is directly related to his having been born close to the end of the eighteenth century.

Heinrich LXXII abdicated in 1848, due to civil unrest in connection with the revolutions that spread through Germany and elsewhere in Europe that year. Because he was the last of his branch of the family, on his death his principality passed to the Prince Reuss zu Schleiz, unifying the lands of the Reuss Younger Line.

== Ancestry ==
Ancestors of Heinrich LXXII, Prince Reuss of Lobenstein and Ebersdorf

8. Heinrich XXIX, Count of Reuss-Ebersdorf
4. Heinrich XXIV, Count Reuss of Ebersdorf
9. Countess Sophie Theodora of Castell-Remlingen
2. Heinrich LI, Prince Reuss of Ebersdorf
10. George August, Count of Erbach-Schönberg
5. Countess Karoline Ernestine of Erbach-Schönberg
11. Ferdinande Henriette, Countess of Stolberg-Gedern
1. Heinrich LXXII, Prince Reuss of Lobenstein and Ebersdorf
12. Count Louis Gebhard of Hoym
6. Count Gotthelf Adolf of Hoym
13. Rahel Louise of Hoym
3. Luise of Hoym
14. Count Frederick Botho of Stolberg-Roßla
7. Sophie Auguste of Stolberg-Rossla
15. Countess Sophie Reuss of Gera
