= Princess Victoria of Saxe-Coburg-Saalfeld =

Mother of Queen Victoria (1786–1861)

Victoria of Saxe-Coburg-Saalfeld
- Princess of Leiningen; Duchess of Kent and Strathearn
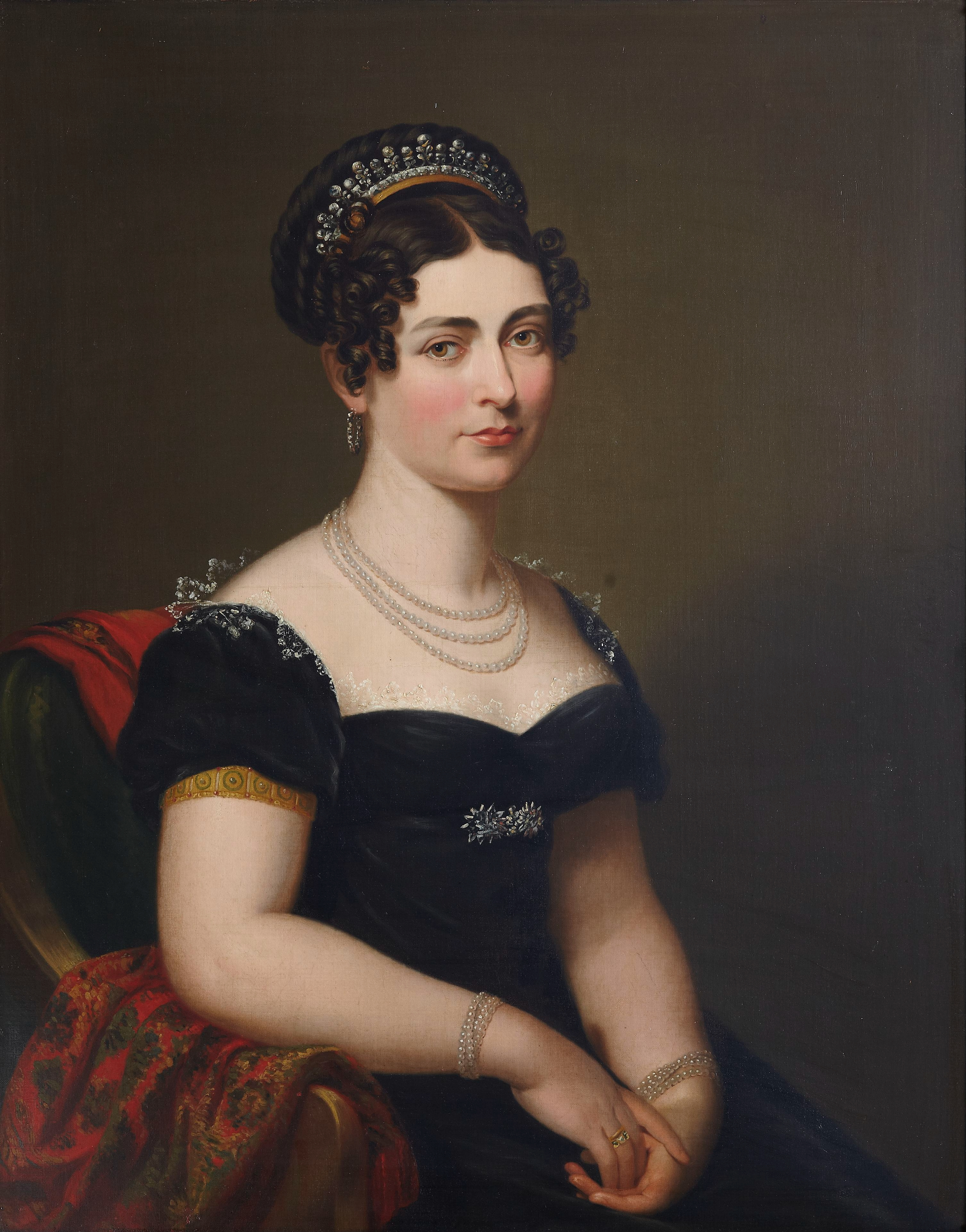
- Portrait by George Dawe, c. 1818
- Born: Princess Victoria of Saxe-Coburg-Saalfeld; 17 August 1786; Coburg, Saxe-Coburg-Saalfeld, Holy Roman Empire
- Died: 16 March 1861 (aged 74); Frogmore House, Windsor, Berkshire, England
- Burial: 25 March 1861: Royal Vault, St George's Chapel, Windsor Castle; 1 August 1861 Duchess of Kent's Mausoleum, Frogmore, Berkshire
- Spouses: Emich Karl, Prince of Leiningen (m. 1803; died 1814) Prince Edward, Duke of Kent and Strathearn (m. 1818; died 1820)
- Issue: Karl, Prince of Leiningen; Feodora, Princess of Hohenlohe-Langenburg; Victoria, Queen of the United Kingdom
Names
- German: Marie Louise Victoire
- House: Saxe-Coburg-Saalfeld
- Father: Francis, Duke of Saxe-Coburg-Saalfeld
- Mother: Countess Augusta Reuss of Ebersdorf

Princess Victoria of Saxe-Coburg-Saalfeld (Marie Louise Victoire; 17 August 1786 – 16 March 1861), later Princess of Leiningen and subsequently Duchess of Kent and Strathearn, was a German princess and the mother of Queen Victoria of the United Kingdom. As the widow of Emich Karl, Prince of Leiningen, from 1814, she served as regent of the principality during the minority of her son from her first marriage, Karl, until her second wedding in 1818 to Prince Edward, fourth son of George III.

== Early life ==
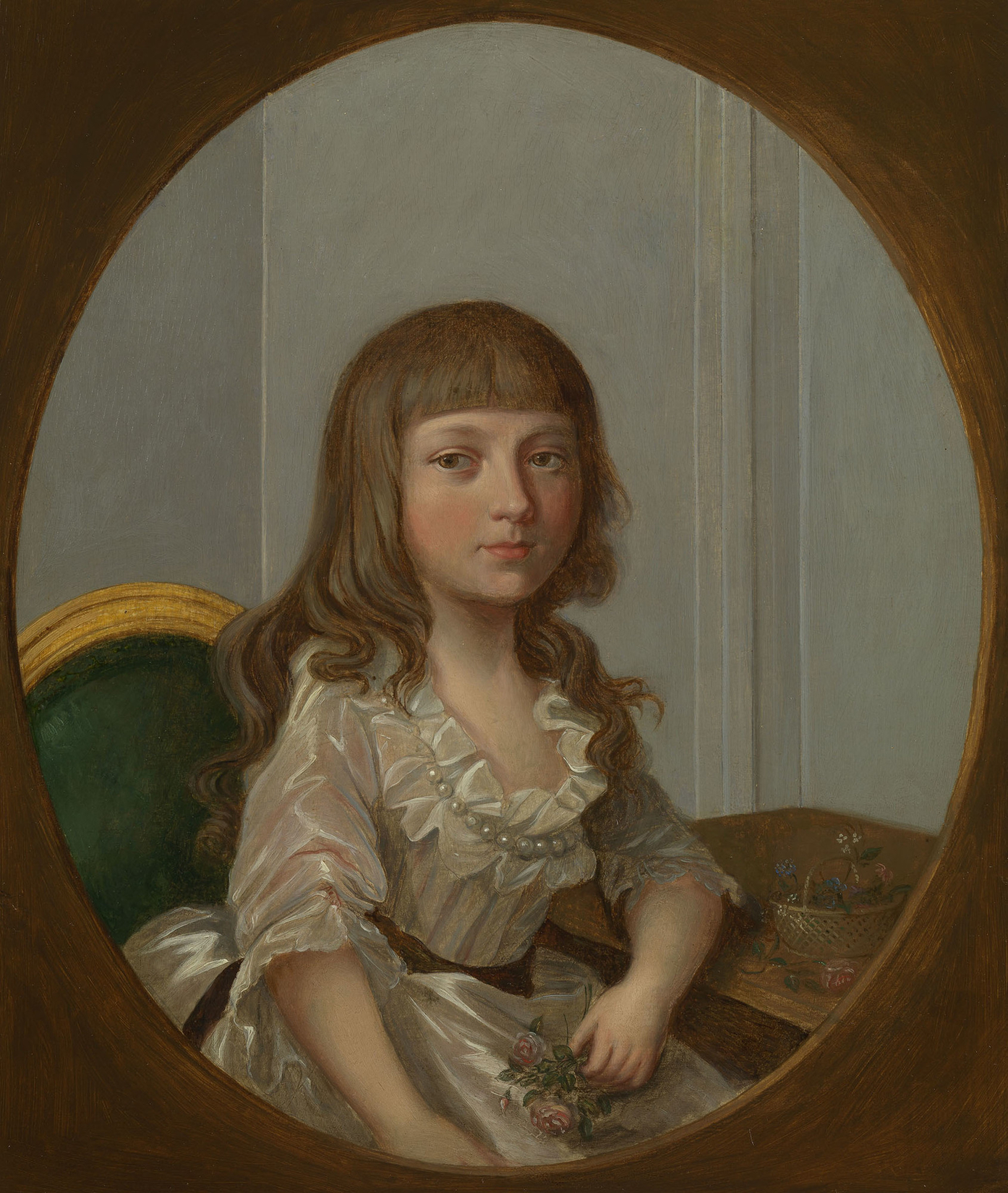
Victoria as a child, c. 1795

Victoria was born in Coburg on 17 August 1786 in the Holy Roman Empire of the German Nation and was named Marie Louise Victoire. She was the fourth daughter and seventh child of Franz Frederick Anton, Duke of Saxe-Coburg-Saalfeld, by his second wife, Countess Augusta Reuss of Ebersdorf.

One of her brothers was Ernest I, Duke of Saxe-Coburg and Gotha. Another brother, Leopold, future king of the Belgians, married, in 1816, Princess Charlotte of Wales, the only legitimate daughter of the future King George IV, and heiress presumptive to the British throne.

== Marriages ==
=== First marriage ===
On 21 December 1803 at Coburg, Victoria married (as his second wife) Emich Karl, Prince of Leiningen, whose first wife, Countess Henrietta Sophie of Reuss-Ebersdorf (1767–1801), was Victoria's mother's younger sister. The couple had two children, Prince Karl, born on 12 September 1804, and Princess Feodora of Leiningen, born on 7 December 1807.

=== Regency ===
After the death of her first spouse (on 4 July 1814), Victoria served as regent of the Principality of Leiningen during the minority of their son, Karl, until her second marriage in 1818.

=== Second marriage ===
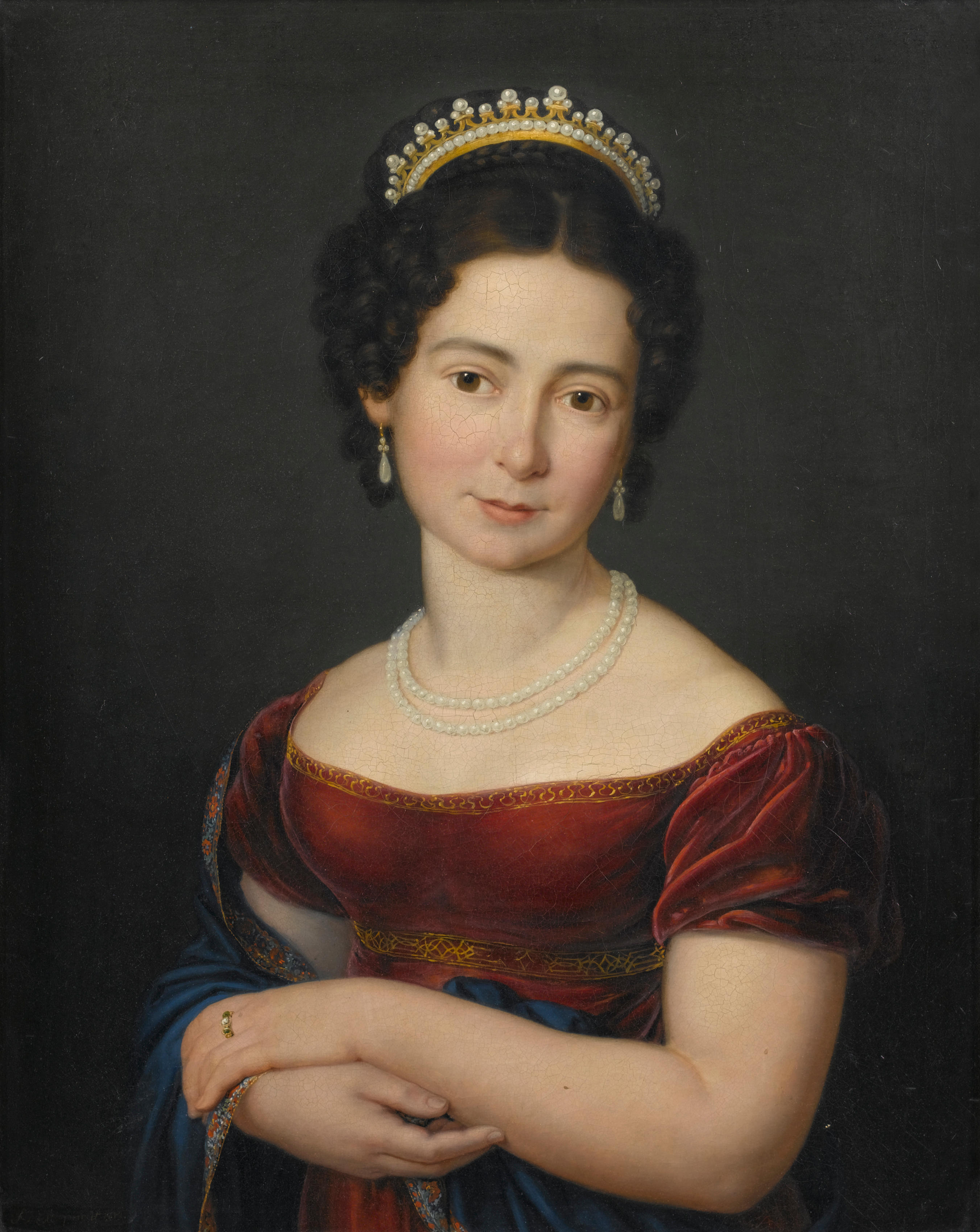
Portrait by Franz Joseph Zoll, 1818

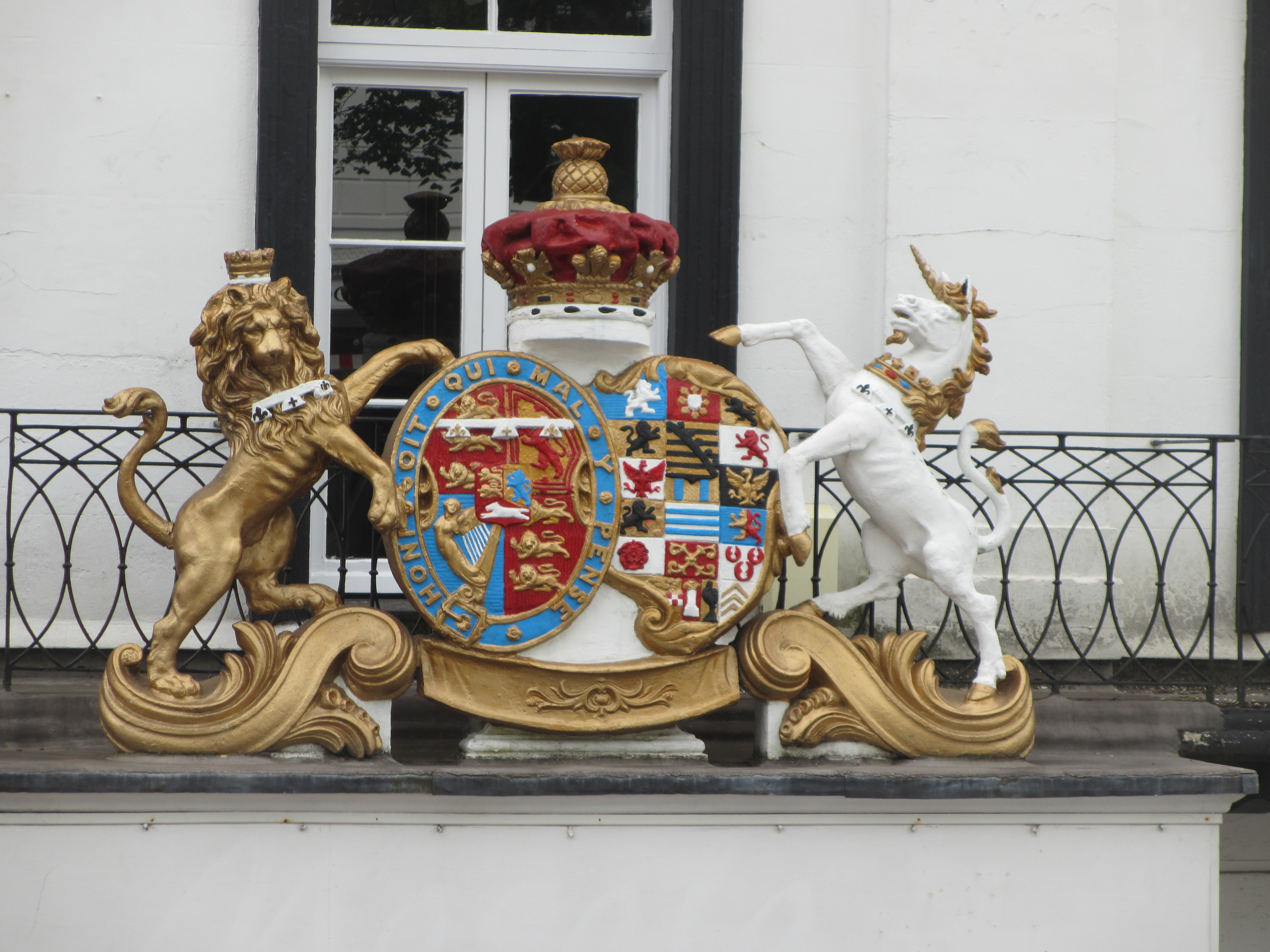
The Arms of the Duchess of Kent and Strathearn, at Royal Tunbridge Wells

The death of Princess Charlotte of Wales, the wife of Victoria's brother Leopold, in 1817, prompted a succession crisis in Great Britain. With Parliament offering them a financial incentive, three of Charlotte's uncles, sons of King George III, were prepared to marry. One of them, Prince Edward, Duke of Kent and Strathearn, proposed to Victoria and she accepted.

The couple were married on 29 May 1818 at Schloss Ehrenburg, Coburg, and on 11 July 1818 at Kew, a joint ceremony at which Edward's brother, the Duke of Clarence and St Andrews, later King William IV, married Adelaide of Saxe-Meiningen. Shortly after their marriage, the Kents moved to Germany, where the cost of living was cheaper. Soon after, Victoria became pregnant, and the Duke and Duchess, determined to have their child born in England, raced back.

An efficient organiser, Sir John Conroy, ensured the Kents' speedy return to England in time for the birth of their first child. Arriving at Dover on 23 April 1819, they moved into Kensington Palace, where Victoria gave birth to a daughter on 24 May 1819, Princess Alexandrina Victoria of Kent, later Queen Victoria.

== Widowhood ==
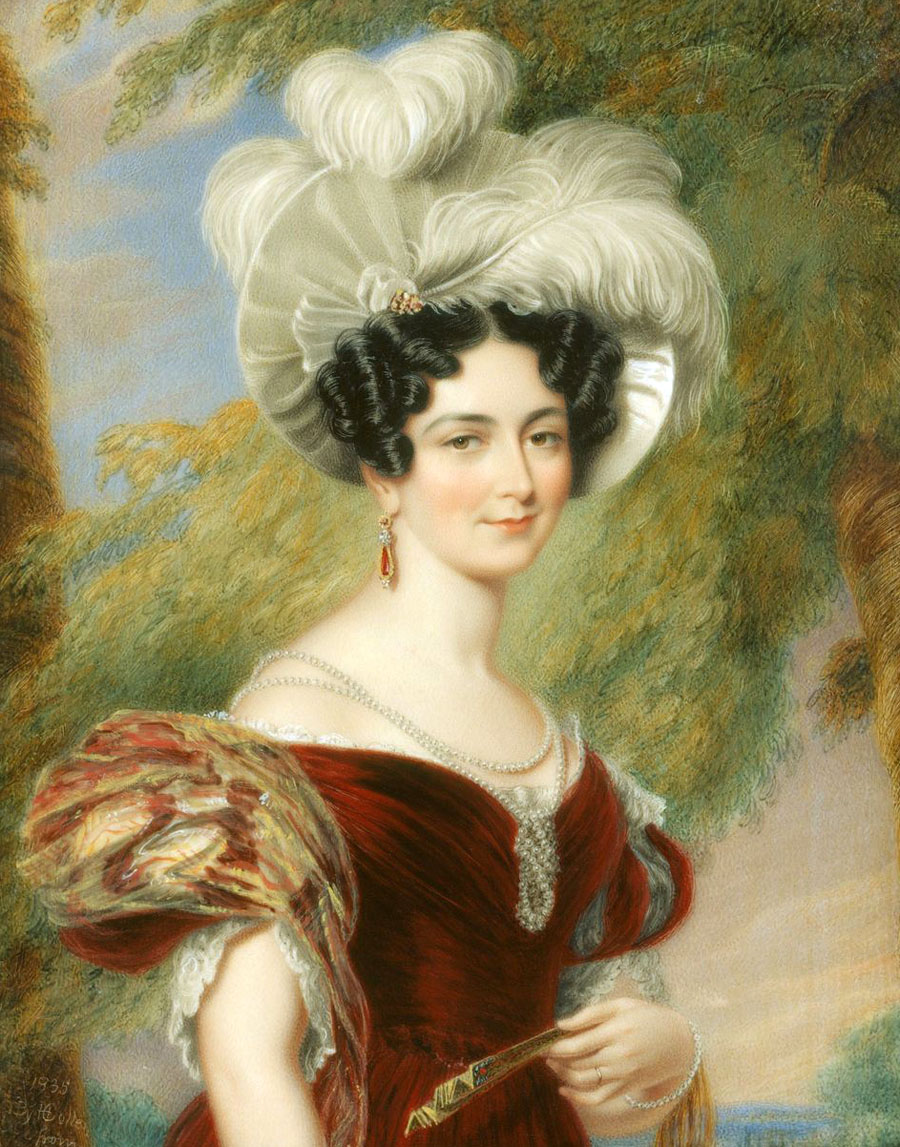
Portrait by Sir George Hayter, 1835

The Duke of Kent died suddenly of pneumonia in January 1820, six days before his father, King George III. His widow Victoria had little cause to remain in the United Kingdom, since she did not speak the language and had a palace at home in Coburg where she could live cheaply on the revenues of her first husband. However, the British succession at this time was far from assured – of the three brothers older than Edward, the new king, George IV, and the Duke of York were both estranged from their wives, who were in any case past childbearing age.

The third brother, the Duke of Clarence, had yet to have any surviving children with his wife. The Duchess of Kent decided that she would do better by gambling on her daughter's accession than by living quietly in Coburg and, having inherited her second husband's debts, sought support from the British government. After the death of Edward and his father, the young Princess Victoria was still only third in line for the throne, and Parliament was not inclined to support yet more impoverished royalty.

The provision made for the Duchess of Kent was mean: she resided in a suite of rooms in the dilapidated Kensington Palace, along with several other impoverished members of the royal family, and received little financial support from the Civil List, since Parliament had vivid memories of the late Duke's extravagance. In practice, a main source of support for her was her brother, Leopold. The latter had a huge income of 50,000 pounds per annum for life, representing an annuity allotted to him by the British Parliament on his marriage to Princess Charlotte, which had made him seem likely to become in due course the consort of the monarch. Even after Charlotte's death, Leopold's annuity was not revoked by Parliament.

In 1831, with George IV dead and the new king, William IV (formerly the Duke of Clarence), being over 60 without any surviving legitimate issue, and whose nearly 40-year-old wife was considered to be at the end of childbearing age, the young princess's status as heir presumptive and the Duchess's prospective place as regent led to major increases in British state income for the Kents. Parliament agreed to an annuity for the Duchess and her daughter in August 1831. A contributing factor was Leopold's designation as King of the Belgians, upon which he surrendered his British income.

Circa 1836 the Duchess composed The Royal Artillery Slow March, which has remained in regular use since its first performance circa 1843.

== Royal feud ==
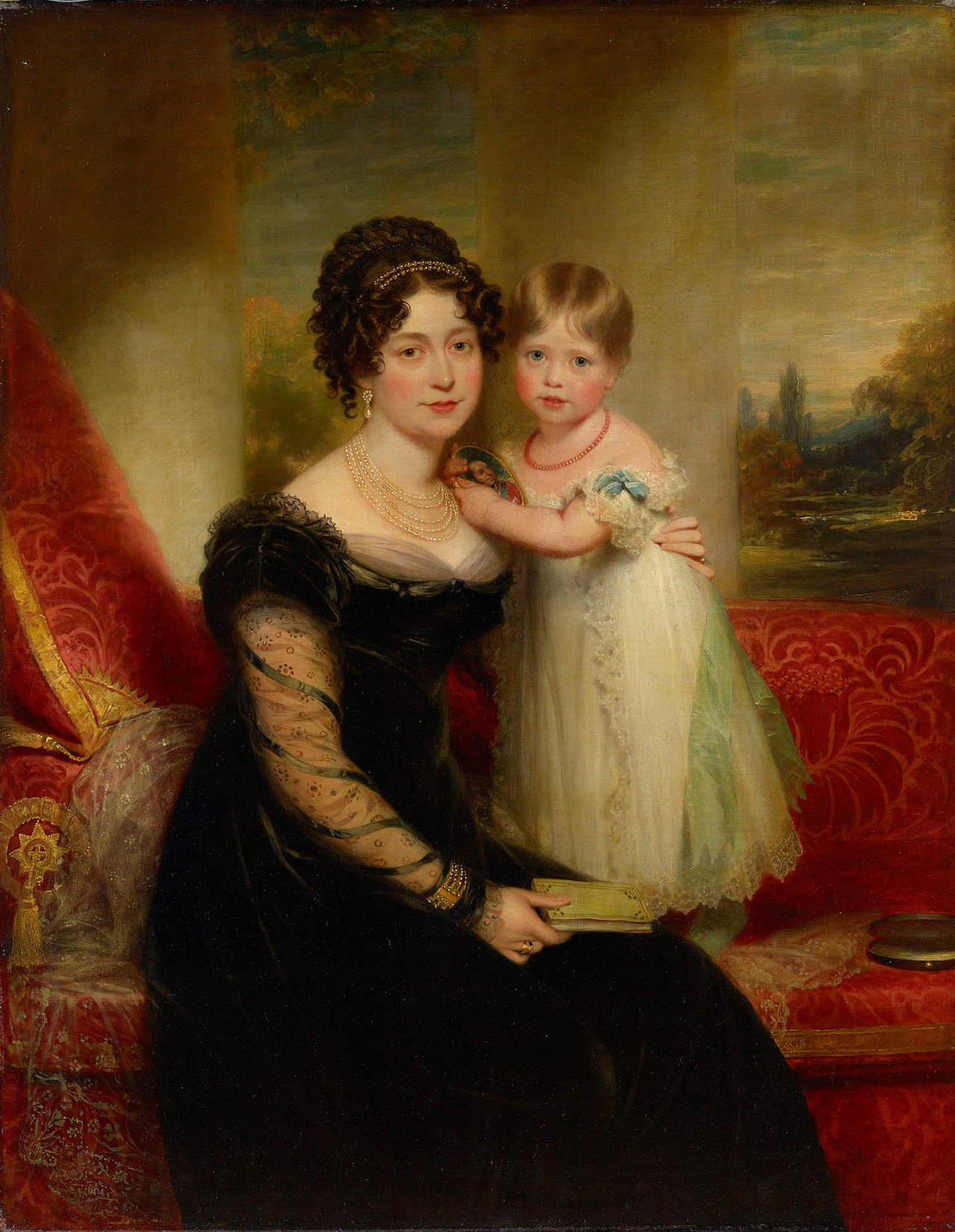
Victoria, Duchess of Kent with Princess Victoria by William Beechey, 1821

Together in a hostile environment, (Note: A German, the Duchess of Kent was unpopular in England, and did not mix well with the British royal family.) John Conroy's relationship with the Duchess was very close, with him serving as her comptroller and private secretary for the next nineteen years, as well as holding the unofficial roles of public relations officer, counsellor, confidant and political agent. While it is not clear which of the two was more responsible for devising the Kensington System, it was created to govern young Victoria's upbringing. The intention was for the Duchess to be appointed regent upon Victoria's (assumed youthful) succession and for Conroy to be created Victoria's private secretary and given a peerage.

The Duchess and Conroy continued to be unpopular with the royal family and, in 1829, the Duke of Cumberland spread rumours that they were lovers in an attempt to discredit them. The Duke of Clarence referred to Conroy as "King John", while the Duchess of Clarence wrote to the Duchess of Kent to advise that she was increasingly isolating herself from the royal family and that she must not grant Conroy too much power.

The Duchess of Kent was extremely protective and raised Victoria largely isolated from other children under the so-called "Kensington System". The system prevented the princess from meeting people whom her mother and Conroy deemed undesirable (including most of her father's family), and was designed to render her weak and dependent upon them. The Duchess avoided the court because she was scandalised by the presence of King William's illegitimate children, and perhaps prompted the emergence of Victorian morality by insisting that her daughter avoid any appearance of sexual impropriety. Victoria shared a bedroom with her mother every night, studied with private tutors to a regular timetable, and spent her play-hours with her dolls and her King Charles Spaniel, Dash.

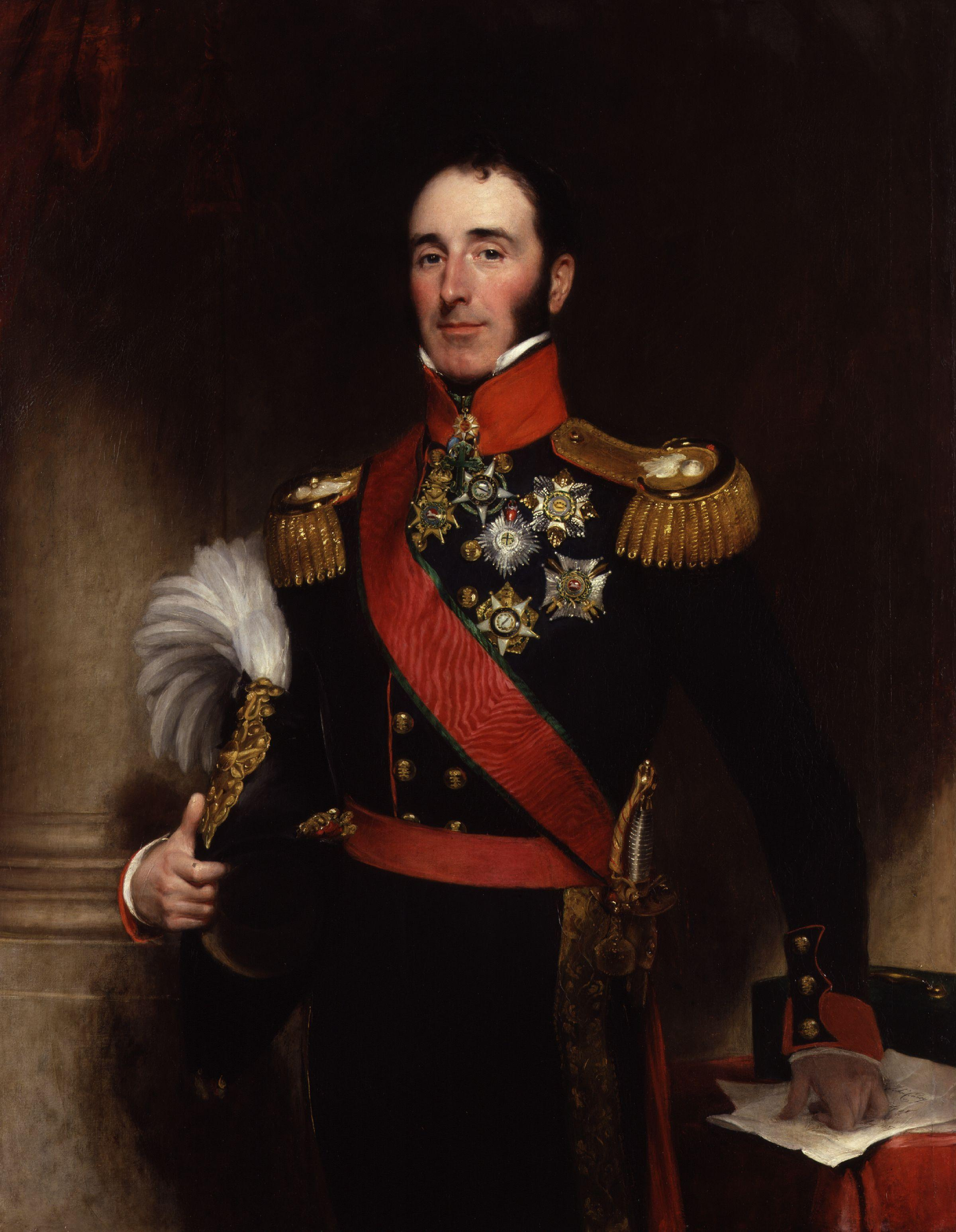
Portrait of John Conroy by Henry William Pickersgill, 1837

Perhaps because of Conroy's influence, the relationship between the Duchess's household and William IV soon soured, with the Duchess regarding the King as an oversexed oaf. As far as she dared, the Duchess denied the King access to his niece. She prevented her daughter from attending William's coronation out of a disagreement of precedence, (Note: King William ordered that Victoria follow his brothers down the aisle during the coronation. The Duchess interpreted this as a deliberate slight.) a decision attributed by the Duke of Wellington to Conroy.

In 1831, the year of William's coronation, Conroy and the Duchess embarked on a series of royal tours with Victoria to expose her to the people and solidify their status as potential regents. Their efforts were ultimately successful and, in November 1831, it was declared that the Duchess would be sole regent in the event of Victoria's young queenship. The Duchess further offended the King by taking rooms in Kensington Palace that the King had reserved for himself, and she snubbed his illegitimate children, the FitzClarences, before and during his reign.

Both the King and Queen Adelaide were fond of their niece, but their attempts to forge a close relationship with the girl were frustrated by the conflict with the Duchess of Kent. The King, angered at what he took to be disrespect from the Duchess to his wife, took the opportunity at what proved to be his final birthday banquet in August 1836 to settle the score. Speaking to those assembled at the banquet, who included the Duchess and Princess Victoria, William expressed his hope that he would survive until Princess Victoria was 18 so that the Duchess of Kent would never be regent. He said,

I trust to God that my life may be spared for nine months longer ... I should then have the satisfaction of leaving the exercise of the Royal authority to the personal authority of that young lady, heiress presumptive to the Crown, and not in the hands of a person now near me, who is surrounded by evil advisers and is herself incompetent to act with propriety in the situation in which she would be placed.

The breach between the Duchess and the King and Queen was never fully healed, but Victoria always viewed both of them with kindness.

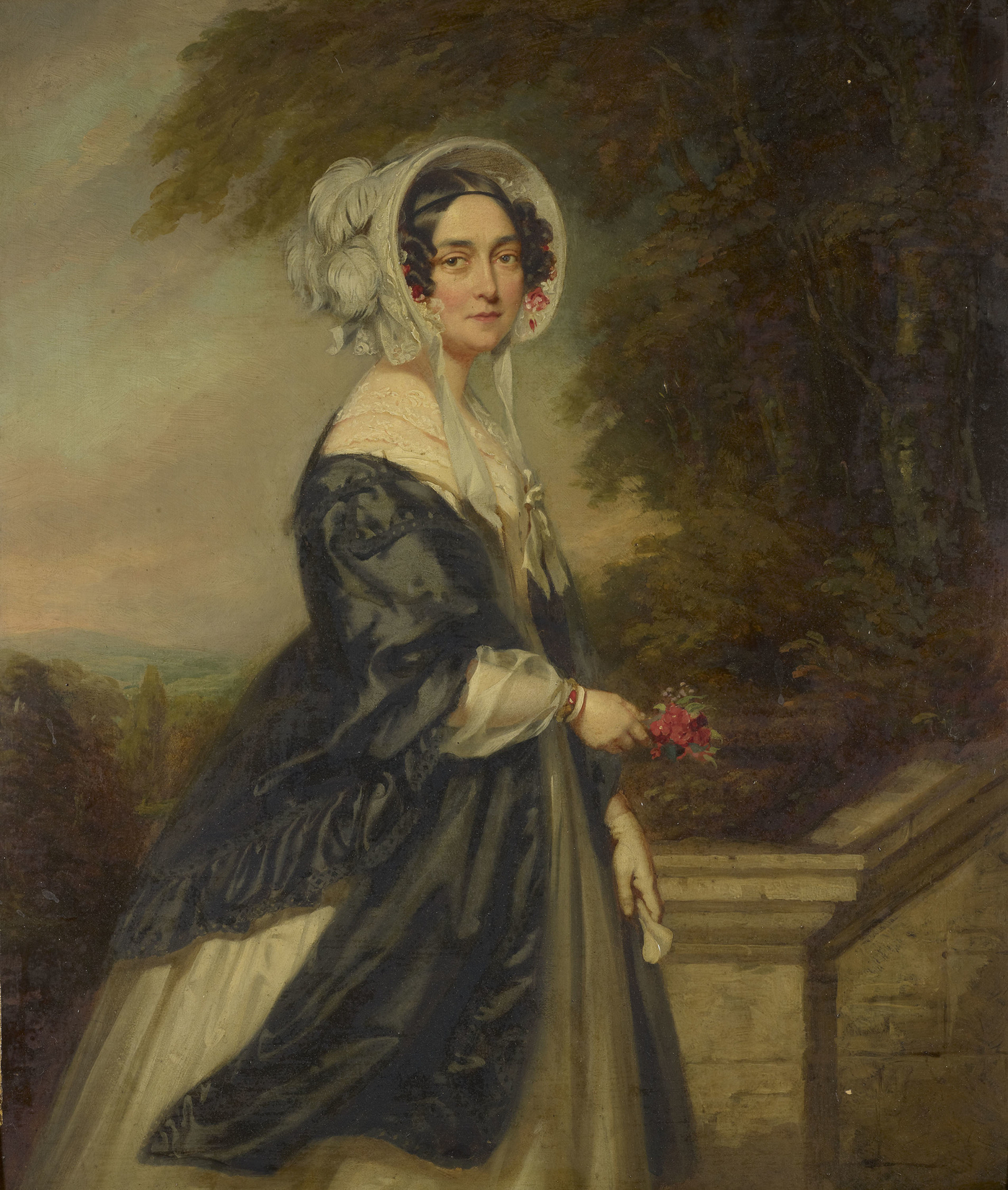
Portrait by John Lucas, 1841

Conroy had high hopes for his patroness and himself: he envisaged Victoria succeeding to the throne at a young age, thus needing a regency government, which, following the Regency Act 1830, would be headed by the princess's mother (who had already served in that capacity in Germany following the death of her first husband). As the personal secretary of the Duchess, Conroy would be the veritable "power behind the throne". He had not counted on William IV surviving long enough for Victoria to come of age and be able to succeed to the throne as an adult and consequently, while cultivating her mother, had shown little consideration for Victoria.

When Victoria succeeded, Conroy risked having no influence over her. He tried to force Victoria to agree to make him her personal secretary once she succeeded, but this plan, too, backfired. Victoria resented her mother's support for Conroy's schemes and being pressured by her to sign a paper declaring Conroy her personal secretary. The result was that when Victoria became queen, she relegated the Duchess to separate accommodation, away from her own.

== Reconciliation ==
When the Queen's first child, the Princess Royal, was born, the Duchess of Kent unexpectedly found herself welcomed back into Victoria's inner circle. It is likely that this came about as a result of the dismissal of Baroness Lehzen at the behest of Victoria's husband (and the Duchess's nephew), Prince Albert. Firstly, this removed Lehzen's influence, and Lehzen had long despised the Duchess and Conroy, suspecting them of an illicit affair.

Secondly, it left the Queen wholly open to Albert's influence, and he likely prevailed upon her to reconcile with her mother. Thirdly, Conroy by now was living in exile on the Continent and so his divisive influence was removed. The Duchess's finances, which had been left in shambles by Conroy, were restored thanks to Victoria and her advisors. By all accounts, the Duchess became a doting grandmother and was closer to her daughter than she ever had been.

== Rumours of affairs ==
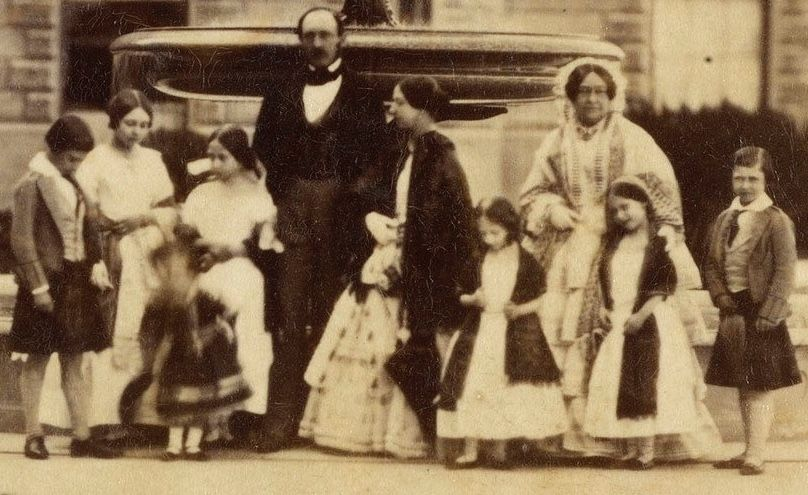
The Duchess of Kent with her daughter, son-in-law and grandchildren, 1854

Historian A. N. Wilson suggests that Victoria's father could not have been the Duke of Kent for two reasons:

- The sudden appearance of hæmophilia in the descendants of Victoria. The illness did not exist in the royal family before.
- The supposed disappearance of porphyria from the descendants of Victoria. According to Wilson, the disease was prevalent in the royal family before Victoria but not afterwards.

In practice, Wilson's first reason would have required the Duchess's lover to be haemophiliac – an extremely unlikely survival, given the poor state of medicine at the time, or the Duchess herself to be a carrier of haemophilia, since haemophilia is X-linked, meaning that her mother would have been a carrier, if haemophilia was not otherwise previously expressed in the Duchess's parents.

Actual evidence to support this theory has not arisen. Haemophilia occurs spontaneously through mutation in at least 30% of cases, and especially in children of older fathers such as Victoria. Haemophilia in the descendants of Victoria and among European royalty, including the Romanoffs, was known as the 'Coburg disease'.

As for Wilson's second reason, there is evidence to suggest Victoria's daughter, Empress Frederick, suffered from porphyria, and John Röhl's book, Purple Secret, documents evidence of porphyria in Empress Frederick's daughter Charlotte, and her granddaughter, Feodora. Röhl also claims that Prince William of Gloucester was diagnosed with porphyria shortly before he died in a flying accident. There is moreover no genetic evidence that the royal family ever had the disease: its diagnosis in George III's case (and others) has been questioned.

== Death ==
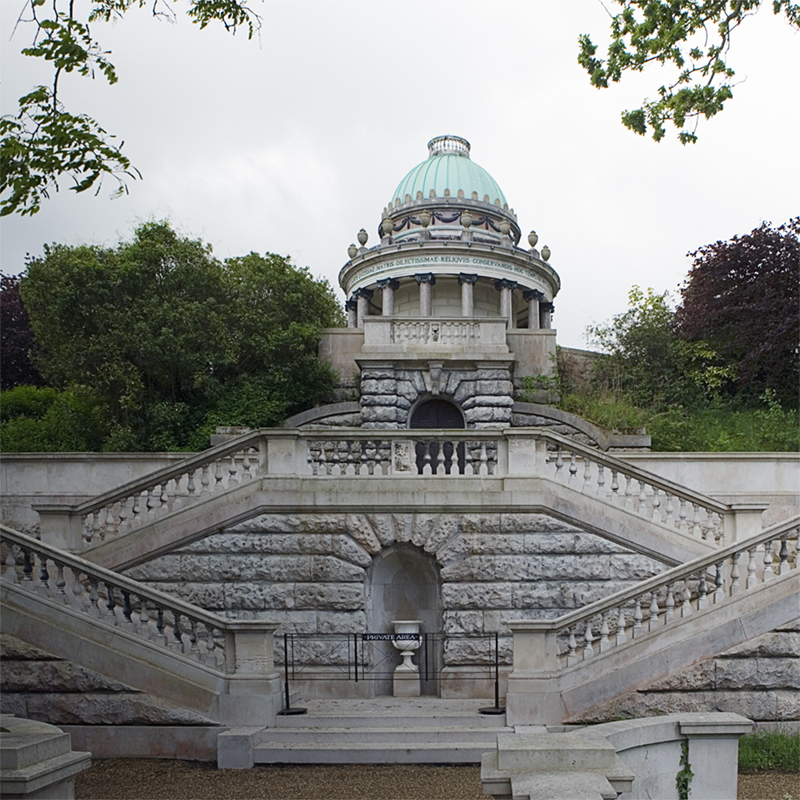
The Duchess of Kent's Mausoleum at Frogmore

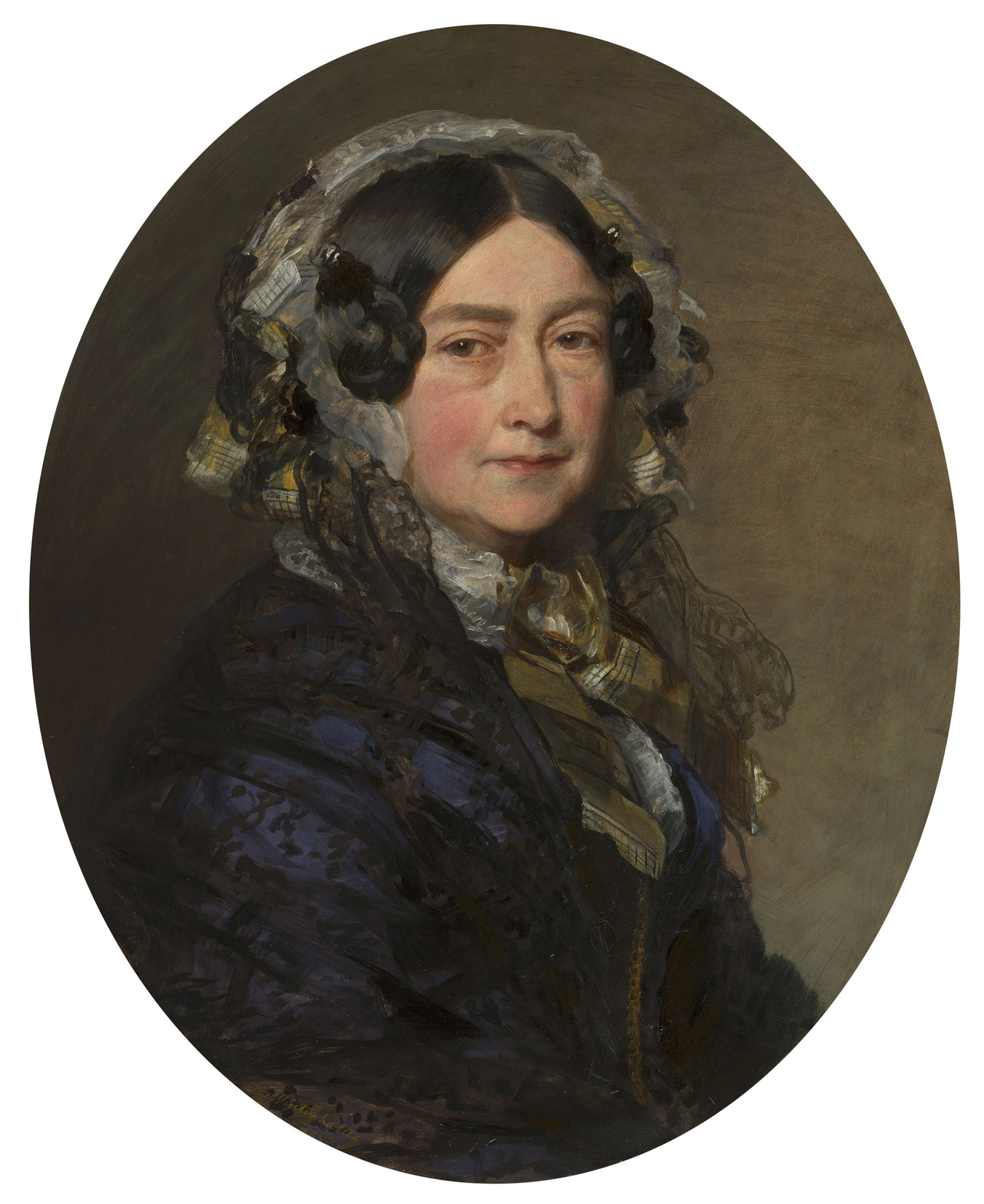
Portrait by Franz Xaver Winterhalter, 1857

The Duchess died at 9:30 am on 16 March 1861, at the age of 74, with her daughter Victoria at her side. The Queen was much affected by her mother's death. Through reading her mother's papers, Victoria discovered that her mother had loved her deeply; she was heart-broken, and blamed Conroy and Lehzen for "wickedly" estranging her from her mother. She is buried in the Duchess of Kent's Mausoleum at Frogmore, Windsor Home Park, near to the royal residence Windsor Castle.

Queen Victoria and Albert dedicated a window in the Royal Chapel of All Saints in Windsor Great Park to her memory.

== Portrayal ==
Princess Victoria of Saxe-Coburg-Saalfeld was portrayed by Alison Leggatt in the ATV drama Edward the Seventh, by Penelope Wilton in the 2001 television serial Victoria and Albert, by Miranda Richardson in the 2009 film The Young Victoria, by Catherine Flemming in the 2016 ITV series Victoria and by Florence Dobson in the 2023 limited series Queen Charlotte.

== Ancestry ==
Ancestors of Princess Victoria of Saxe-Coburg-Saalfeld

8. Francis Josias, Duke of Saxe-Coburg-Saalfeld
4. Ernest Frederick, Duke of Saxe-Coburg-Saalfeld
9. Anna Sophie of Schwarzburg-Rudolstadt
2. Francis, Duke of Saxe-Coburg-Saalfeld
10. Ferdinand Albert II, Duke of Brunswick-Wolfenbüttel
5. Duchess Sophie Antoinette of Brunswick-Wolfenbüttel
11. Princess Antoinette of Brunswick-Wolfenbüttel
1. Princess Victoria of Saxe-Coburg-Saalfeld
12. Heinrich XXIX, Count Reuss of Ebersdorf
6. Heinrich XXIV, Count Reuss of Ebersdorf
13. Countess Sophie Theodora of Castell-Remlingen
3. Countess Augusta Reuss of Ebersdorf
14. George August, Count of Erbach-Schönberg
7. Countess Karoline Ernestine of Erbach-Schönberg
15. Ferdinande Henriette, Countess of Stolberg-Gedern

== See also ==
- Duchess of Kent's Annuity Act 1838

== Bibliography ==
- Allen, W. Gore (1960). King William IV. London: Cresset Press
- Barrow, John Henry (1831). The Mirror of Parliament for the Preliminary Portion of First Session of the Ninth Parliament of Great Britain and Ireland. London: William Clowes.
- Chambers, James (2007). Charlotte and Leopold. London: Old Street Publishing. ISBN 978-1-905847-23-5.
- Gill, Gillian (2009). We Two: Victoria and Albert: Rulers, Partners, Rivals. New York: Ballantine Books. ISBN 978-0-345-52001-2.
- Hibbert, Christopher (2000). Queen Victoria: A Personal History. London: HarperCollins. ISBN 0-00-638843-4.
- Hibbert, Christopher (2001). Queen Victoria: A Personal History. Da Capo Press. ISBN 978-0-306-81085-5.
- Hough, Richard (1996). Victoria and Albert. New York: St. Martin's Press. ISBN 978-0-312-30385-3.
- Longford, Elizabeth (1964) Victoria R.I., London: Weidenfeld & Nicolson, ISBN 0-297-17001-5
- Longford, Elizabeth (2004a). "Edward, Prince, Duke of Kent and Strathearn (1767–1820)". Oxford Dictionary of National Biography (online ed.). Oxford University Press. doi:10.1093/ref:odnb/8526. (Subscription, Wikipedia Library access or UK public library membership required.)
- Longford, Elizabeth (2004b). "Conroy, Sir John Ponsonby, first baronet (1786–1854), courtier". Oxford Dictionary of National Biography (online ed.). Oxford University Press. doi:10.1093/ref:odnb/37309. (Subscription, Wikipedia Library access or UK public library membership required.) (subscription required)
- Marshall, Dorothy (1972) The Life and Times of Queen Victoria, London: Weidenfeld & Nicolson, ISBN 0-297-83166-6 [1992 reprint]
- Packard, Gerrold (1973). Victoria's Daughters. New York: St. Martin's Press
- Rappaport, Helen (2003). Queen Victoria: A Biographical Companion. Santa Barbara, CA: ABC-CLIO, Inc. ISBN 978-1-85109-355-7.
- Somerset, Anne (1980). The Life and Times of William IV. London, Weidenfeld & Nicolson, ISBN 978-0-297-83225-6.
- St Aubyn, Giles (1991) Queen Victoria: A Portrait, London: Sinclair-Stevenson, ISBN 1-85619-086-2
- Vallone, Lynne (2001). Becoming Victoria. Yale University Press. ISBN 978-0-300-08950-9.
- Waller, Maureen (2006) Sovereign Ladies: The Six Reigning Queens of England, London: John Murray, ISBN 0-7195-6628-2
- Williams, Kate (2010). Becoming Queen Victoria: The Tragic Death of Princess Charlotte and the Unexpected Rise of Britain's Greatest Monarch. Ballantine Books. ISBN 978-0-345-46195-7.
- Woodham-Smith, Cecil (1972) Queen Victoria: Her Life and Times 1819–1861, London: Hamish Hamilton, ISBN 0-241-02200-2
