= Heinrich XXIV, Count Reuss of Ebersdorf =

Count of Reuss-Ebersdorf (1724–1779)

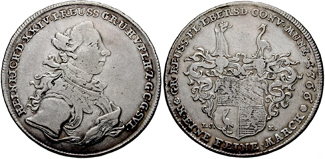
- Thaler from 1766, depicting Count Heinrich XXIV Reuss of Ebersdorf
- Born: 22 January 1724; Ebersdorf
- Died: 13 May 1779 (aged 55); Ebersdorf
- Noble family: Reuss
- Spouse: Karoline Ernestine of Erbach-Schönberg
- Issue: Augusta, Duchess of Saxe-Coburg-Saalfeld
- Father: Heinrich XXIX, Count of Reuss-Ebersdorf
- Mother: Sophie Theodora of Castell-Remlingen

Heinrich XXIV, Count Reuss of Ebersdorf (22 January 1724, in Ebersdorf – 13 May 1779, in Ebersdorf), was ruler of the German county Reuss-Ebersdorf from 1747 until his death in 1779. He succeeded his father as Count of Reuss-Ebersdorf.

== Family ==
Heinrich XXIV was the eldest son of the thirteen children of Heinrich XXIX, Count of Reuss-Ebersdorf and Sophie Theodora of Castell-Remlingen. On 28 June 1754, Heinrich XXIV married Countess Karoline Ernestine of Erbach-Schönberg in Thurnau. They had seven children:

1. Heinrich XLVI (b. Ebersdorf, 14 May 1755 — d. Ebersodrf, 18 April 1757).
2. Augusta (b. Ebersdorf, 9 January 1757 — d. Coburg, 16 November 1831), Princess of Reuss-Ebersdorf (German: Prinzessin Reuß zu Ebersdorf) on 9 April 1806; married on 13 June 1777 to Duke Franz of Saxe-Coburg-Saalfeld. Via this marriage, Heinrich XXIV was the grandfather of King Leopold I of Belgium and the great-grandfather of Queen Victoria.
3. Luise (b. Ebersdorf, 2 June 1759 — d. Lobenstein, 5 December 1840), Princess of Reuss-Ebersdorf (German: Prinzessin Reuß zu Ebersdorf) on 9 April 1806; married on 1 June 1781 to Prince Heinrich XLIII of Reuss-Köstritz.
4. Heinrich LI (b. Ebersdorf, 16 May 1761 — d. Ebersdorf, 10 July 1822), became Prince of Reuss-Ebersdorf (German: Fürst Reuß zu Ebersdorf) on 9 April 1806.
5. Ernestine Ferdinande (b. Ebersdorf, 28 April 1762 — d. Ebersdorf, 19 May 1763).
6. Heinrich LIII (b. Ebersdorf, 24 May 1765 — d. Ebersdorf, 28 June 1770).
7. Henriette (b. Ebersdorf, 9 May 1767 — d. Coburg, 3 September 1801), married on 4 July 1787 to Prince Karl of Leiningen-Dagsburg-Hartenburg.

== Ancestry ==
Ancestors of Heinrich XXIV, Count Reuss of Ebersdorf

8. Heinrich X, Count of Reuss-Lobenstein
4. Heinrich X, Count of Reuss-Ebersdorf
9. Marie Sibylle of Reuss-Obergreiz
2. Heinrich XXIX, Count of Reuss-Ebersdorf
10. Johann Friedrich, Count of Solms-Laubach
5. Erdmuthe Benigna of Solms-Laubach
11. Benigna of Promnitz
1. Heinrich XXIV, Count Reuss of Ebersdorf
12. Wolfgang Georg I of Castell-Remlingen
6. Wolfgang, Count of Castell-Remlingen
13. Sophia Juliana of Hohenlohe-Waldenburg
3. Countess Sophie Theodora of Castell-Remlingen
14. Maximilian Erasmus, Count of Zinzendorf-Pottendorf
7. Dorothea Renata of Zinzendorf-Pottendorf
15. Anna Amalia of Dietrichstein-Hollenburg
