= Saalburg-Ebersdorf =

- Town
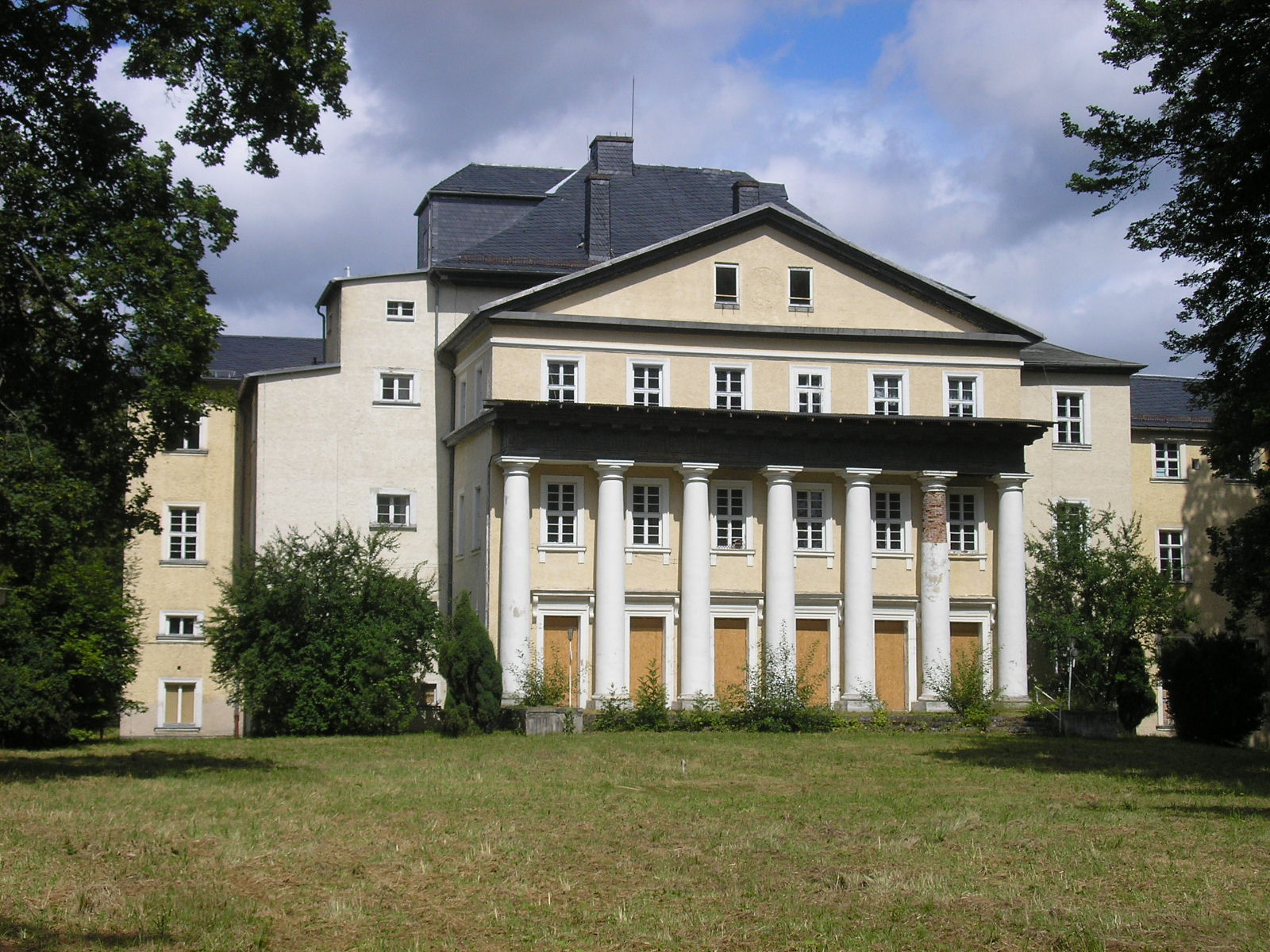
- Ebersdorf Castle

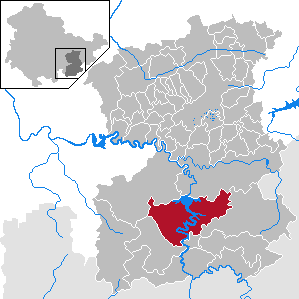
- Location of Saalburg-Ebersdorf within Saale-Orla-Kreis district
- Interactive map of Saalburg-Ebersdorf
- Location within Germany Location within Thuringia
- Coordinates: 50°29′30″N 11°42′0″E
- Country: Germany
- State: Thuringia
- District: Saale-Orla-Kreis

Government
  - Mayor (2022–28): Carsten Hahn

Area
  - Total: 72.05 km^{2} (27.82 sq mi)
- Elevation: 431 m (1,414 ft)

Population (2025-12-31)
  - Total: 3,271
  - Density: 45.40/km^{2} (117.6/sq mi)
- Time zone: UTC+01:00 (CET)
  - Summer (DST): UTC+02:00 (CEST)
- Postal codes: 07929, 07368
- Dialling codes: 036647, 036651
- Vehicle registration: SOK
- Website: www.saalburg-ebersdorf.de

Saalburg-Ebersdorf (German pronunciation: [ˈzaːlbʊʁk ˈʔeːbɐsdɔʁf]) is a town in the Saale-Orla-Kreis district, in Thuringia, Germany close to the Bavarian border. It is situated on the river Saale, 10 km southwest of Schleiz, 30 km west of Plauen and 30 km north-west of Hof.

The town is an administrative union of two large villages (Saalburg and Ebersdorf) lying either side of the Saale river near the Bleilochtalsperre as well as several smaller villages in between and around them.

== History ==
The earliest records of the towns and villages of Saalburg-Ebersdorf are from the thirteenth and fourteenth centuries. They lay on and around the historical trade route between Nuremberg and Leipzig.

Saalburg and Ebersdorf became increasingly important in the seventeenth century as regional seats of the Counts von Reuss.

=== Saalburg ===
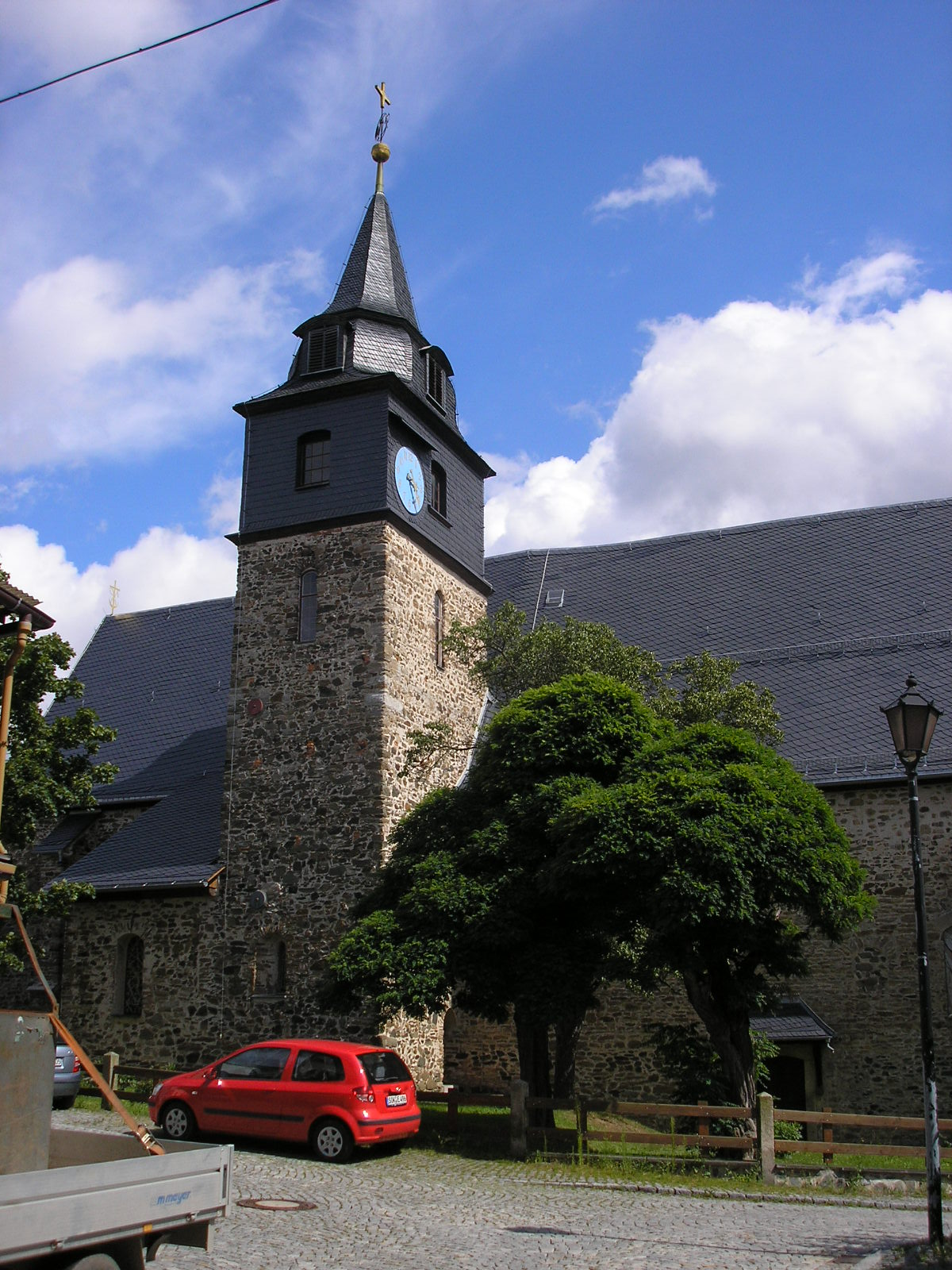

Saalburg was established under the Lobdaburger reign in around 1313. Some ruins from this early settlement remain today, including a 3-meter-high remnant of the city wall.

From 1647-1666, Saalburg was the seat of the state of Reuss-Saalburg.

Saalburg subsequently became part of the state of Reuss-Greiz (or Reuss Elder Line).

=== Ebersdorf ===
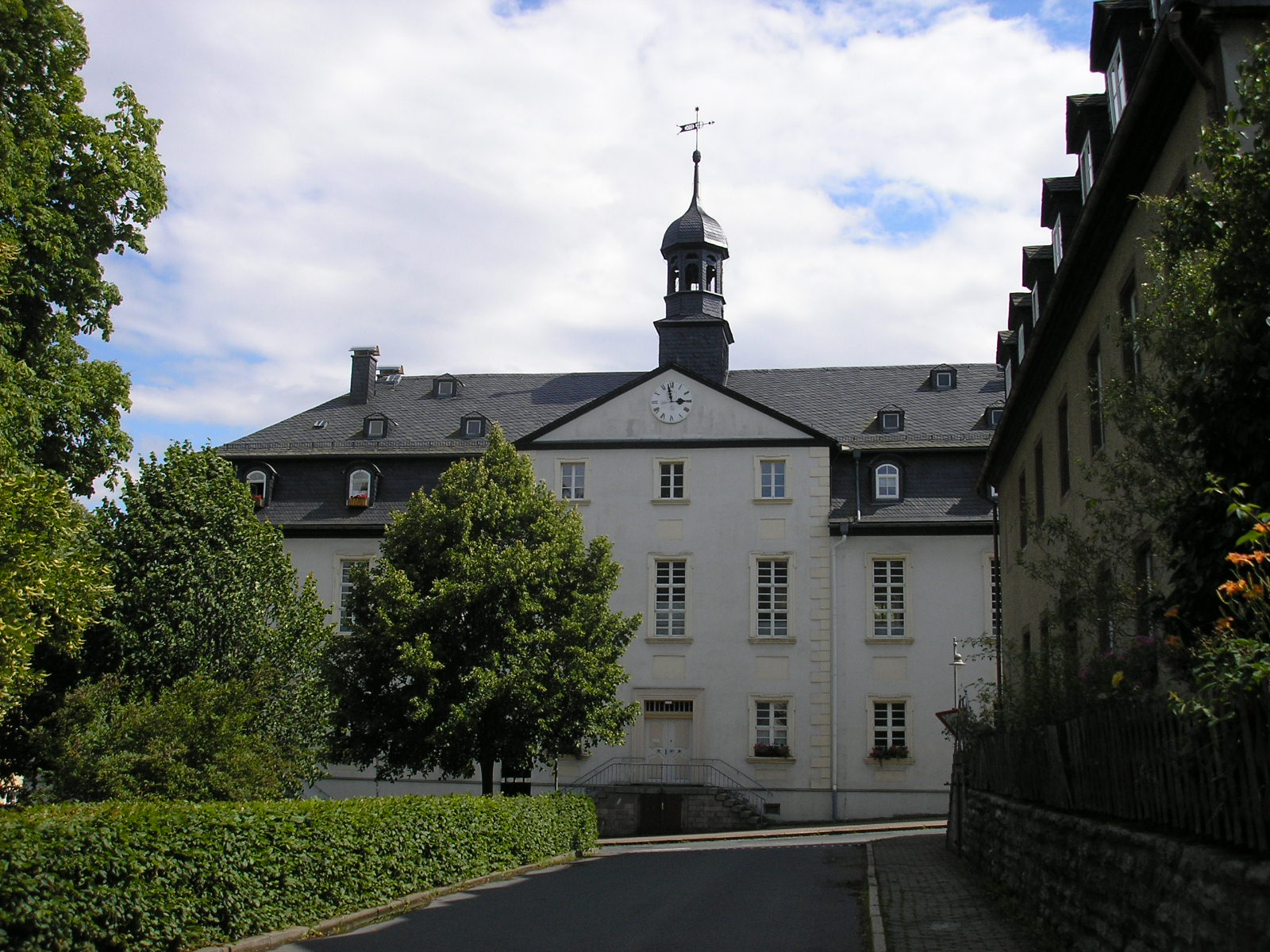
Moravian church, Ebersdorf

Ebersdorf dates its foundation to 1401.

In 1678, the state of Reuss-Lobenstein was partitioned and the state of Reuss-Ebersdorf was created under Heinrich X. Schloss Ebersdorf was built in 1692-1694 to house the court of the new state.

Under the influence of the Reuss Princes, Ebersdorf became a centre of Pietism in Germany. The related Moravian faith also took a minority hold in Ebersdorf after the marriage of Erdmuthe Dorothea Reuss-Ebersdorf to Nicolaus Zinzendorf.

The Moravian Church (pictured) was built in 1746. The classical west facade of Schloss Ebersdorf, shown in the main photo above, was designed by Christian Friedrich Schuricht and was completed in 1792.

=== Napoleonic wars and German confederation ===
On 8 October 1806, Napoleon's troops first entered Prussian territory and battles took place on the banks of the Saale between the forces of Napoleon I of France and Frederick William III of Prussia. Napoleon spent the night of 8 October in Schloss Ebersdorf. This (a precursor to the Battle of Schleiz on 9 October and the Battle of Jena-Auerstadt on 14 October), was the first battle of the War of the Fourth Coalition.

From 1807 until 1813, the Principality of Reuss-Ebersdorf became part of the Confederation of the Rhine. From 1813, the Principality became a member (successively) of the German Confederation the Thuringian Trade Association, the Central German Trade Association and (from 1833) the Zollverein. In 1849, the Principality became a constitutional monarchy. During the Austro-Prussian War of 1866, the Principality took a neutral position while the Reuss, Elder Line was aligned with the Austrian Empire. Both joined the North German Confederation in 1866 and became part of unified Germany in 1871.

=== Twentieth century ===
In 1919, Ebersdorf became part of the independent (and short-lived) Republic of Reuss, before in 1920 this state (and hence Ebersdorf) joined the newly established Free State of Thuringia within the Weimar Republic.

After the Second World War, the region became part of the newly created District of Gera (Bezirk Gera) in 1952 within the German Democratic Republic (East Germany). After German reunification in 1990, Salburg and Ebersdorf became part of the restored state of Thuringia.

=== Formation of Saalburg-Ebersdorf ===
Saalburg and Ebersdorf were legally merged on 1 January 2003.

== Sights ==
- The Steinerne Rose is a rare form of natural rock monument.

== SonneMondSterne ==
Saalburg-Ebersdorf hosts the SonneMondSterne festival, an outdoor music festival which is one of the largest in Europe and which has featured acts such as Massive Attack; David Guetta; Skrillex; The Chemical Brothers; Hot Chip; Faithless; Kraftwerk; and Underworld.

== Twinning ==
Saalburg-Ebersdorf is twinned with Renningen (Baden-Württemberg).

== Famous residents ==
Countess Augusta Reuss-Ebersdorf, daughter of Count Heinrich XXIV, was the mother of Leopold I of Belgium and Victoria, Duchess of Kent and grandmother of Ernest II, Duke of Saxe-Coburg and Gotha, Queen Victoria, Prince Albert, Ferdinand II of Portugal, Leopold II of Belgium, and Empress Carlota of Mexico, among others.

Heinrich LXXII met Lola Montez in London in the middle of 1843 and gave her a loose invitation to visit him in Ebersdorf. Her visit was not a success and she was quickly moved on again.

Erdmuthe Dorothea, Countess von Reuss-Ebersdorf (1700–1757) married Nicolaus Ludwig, Imperial Count von Zinzendorf (1700–1760) Renewer of the Moravian Church in 1722. Her family became very involved in the Moravian Church and a Moravian Settlement was started in Ebersdorf in the 1730s. The settlement was a center of education and social work in the Thuringian Forest. Today the Moravian Church operates a children's home and retreat center in the Congregation in Ebersdorf.
