= Countess Sophie Theodora of Castell-Remlingen =

Sophie Theodora of Castell-Remlingen (12 May 1703, Castell - 8 January 1777, Herrnhut) was a German noblewoman. By birth she was a member of the House of Castell-Remlingen and by marriage member of the House of Reuss.

== Early life ==
Sophie was the sixth child and fourth daughter of Wolfgang Dietrich of Castell-Remlingen and Countess Dorothea Renata of Zinzendorf and Pottendorf (1669-1743). Count Wolfgang Dietrich had fourteen children altogether, of whom Sophie Theodora was the twelfth child and tenth daughter.

== Marriage and issue ==
On 7 September 1721 Sophie married Heinrich XXIX, Count of Reuss-Ebersdorf. They had:

- Renate Benigna (1722–1747)
- Heinrich XXIV (1724–1779), Count of Reuss-Ebersdorf, grandfather of Princess Victoria of Saxe-Coburg-Saalfeld and great-grandfather of Queen Victoria
- Heinrich XXVI (1725–1796)
- Heinrich XXVIII (30 August 1726 – 10 May 1797), married Countess Agnes Sophie of Promnitz (1720–1791), daughter of Count Erdmann II of Promnitz
- Sophie Auguste (1728–1753), married 1748, Baron Ludwig von Weitelfshausen-Schautenbach
- Charlotte Louise (1729–1792)
- Heinrich XXXI (1731–1763)
- Heinrich XXXII (born: 1733, killed in the Battle of Lobositz on 1 October 1756)
- Heinrich XXXIII (1734–1791)
- Heinrich XXXIV (1737–1806)
- Christiane Eleonore (1739–1761)
- Mary Elizabeth (1740–1784), married in 1765 Heinrich XXV, Count of Reuss-Lobenstein
- Johanna Dorothea (1743–1801) married in 1770 Christoph Friedrich Levin von Trotha

== Bibliography ==
- Thomas Gehrlein: "Das Haus Reuss: Älterer und Jüngerer Linie", booklet, August 2006
- Stephan Hirzel: Der Graf und die Brüder, Quell Verlag, Stuttgart, 1980, ISBN 3-7918-4001-0
