= Erdmuthe Dorothea of Reuss-Ebersdorf =

German poet and author of Pietist hymns

Her Illustrious Highness Erdmuthe Dorothea of Reuss-Ebersdorf
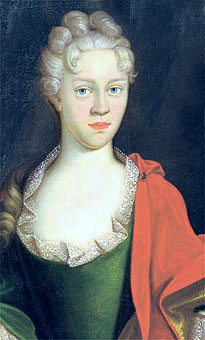
- Portrait of Erdmuthe Dorothea, Countess of Zinzendorf
- Born: 7 November 1700; Ebersdorf
- Died: 19 June 1756 (aged 55); Herrnhut
- Noble family: Reuss-Ebersdorf
- Spouse: Nikolaus Ludwig von Zinzendorf
- Father: Heinrich X, Count of Reuss-Ebersdorf
- Mother: Erdmuthe Benigna of Solms-Laubach

Erdmuthe Dorothea, Countess of Zinzendorf and Pottendorf (née Countess of Reuss-Ebersdorf; 7 November 1700 – 19 June 1756) was a German Pietist and hymn writer.

== Early life ==
Countess Erdmuthe Dorothea von Reuss-Ebersdorf was born on 7 November 1700 in the village of Ebersdorf, in Thuringia. She was the daughter of Count Henry X of Reuss-Ebersdorf and his wife, Countess Erdmuthe Benigna of Solms-Laubach (1670–1732).

== Biography ==
She had a pietistic upbringing according to the principles Philip Jacob Spener.

In 1721, at the wedding of her brother, Henry XXIX, she met his friend Count Nikolaus Ludwig von Zinzendorf. Exactly one year later, she married him. The marriage was described as combative, based on a mutual decision to strive for mutual goals, rather than convenience or love. They had twelve children, among them, Count Christian Renatus von Zinzendorf.

Erdmuthe, who had learned from her mother how to administer a county, took over the business of managing her husband's possessions in Berthelsdorf and the newly founded settlement of Herrnhut. In the Moravian Church, she ran the orphanage, in addition to raising her own twelve children. After her husband's first expulsion in 1732, he transferred his possessions to her. She toured several European countries together with her husband and during his eleven years of exile, she administered his assets and managed the Moravian Church.

In 1755 her husband returned from exile in London. They had grown apart during his exile, and lived separately after his return: he resided at his castle in Berthelsdorf; she lived in Herrnhut palace. After the death of her last son, Christian Renatus, her health began failing.

== Legacy ==
Erdmuthe Dorothea wrote a number of hymns and initiated the annual publication Daily Watchwords.

== Bibliography ==
- Erika Geiger: Erdmuth Dorothea Gräfin von Zinzendorf, SCM Hänssler, 3rd ed., Holzgerlingen, 2009, ISBN 978-3-7751-4825-2
- Wilhelm Jannasch: Erdmuthe Dorothea Gräfin von Zinzendorf, geborene Gräfin Reuss zu Plauen, ihr Leben als Beitrag zur Geschichte des Pietismus und der Brüdergemeine dargestellt, Verein für Brüdergeschichte, Herrnhut and Unitätsbuchhandlung, Gnadau; also in: Zeitschrift für Brüdergeschichte, vol. 8, 1914; also: thesis, Heidelberg, 1914
- Georg Brückner (1877). "Erdmuthe Dorothea" . Allgemeine Deutsche Biographie (in German). Vol. 6. Leipzig: Duncker & Humblot. pp. 193–194.
