= Heinrich X of Reuss-Ebersdorf =

Heinrich X, Count of Reuss-Ebersdorf
- Born: 29 November 1662; Bad Lobenstein
- Died: 10 June 1711 (aged 48); Ebersdorf
- Noble family: House of Reuss
- Spouse: Erdmuthe Benigna of Solms-Laubach
- Father: Henry X, Count of Reuss-Lobenstein
- Mother: Marie Sibylle of Reuss-Obergreiz

Heinrich X, Count of Reuss-Ebersdorf (29 November 1662 in Bad Lobenstein – 10 June 1711 in Ebersdorf), was a member of the House of Reuss (younger line). He was Count of Lobenstein, and from 1678, Count of Ebersdorf. He was the founder of Reuss-Ebersdorf line.

== Life ==
Henry was the youngest son of Henry X, Count of Reuss-Lobenstein, Lord of Lobenstein, Hirschberg and Ebersdorf and Marie Sibylle of Reuss-Obergreiz. His paternal grandfather was Henry II, Count of Reuss-Gera. When the county was divided in 1678, Henry X was assigned as his residence the village of Ebersdorf, which was unusual, since it was a village. Before he married, he had the existing manor house expanded to a modest castle between 1692 and 1694, and added a Baroque garden.

When his castle was ready, Henry X finally married, on 29 November 1694, in Laubach with Erdmuthe Benigna, daughter of Count Johann Frederick of Solms-Laubach (1625–1696) and Baroness Benigna of Promnitz-Sorau (1648-1702). Both spouses were seen as extremely pious. They were close friends of the Pietist-pedagogue August Hermann Francke from Halle, and later with the Count Nikolaus Ludwig of Zinzendorf, who would marry their daughter Erdmuthe Dorothea. Ebersdorf soon became a center of the Pietism in Thuringia.

== Issue ==
Count Henry X had the following children:

- Benigna Marie (1695-1751)
- Friederike Wilhelmine (1696-1698)
- Charlotte Louise (1698-1698)
- Heinrich XXIX (1699-1747), Count of Reuss-Ebersdorf, married in 1721 Countess Sophie Theodora of Castell-Remlingen (1703-1777)
- Erdmuthe Dorothea (1700-1756), married in 1722 with Count Nicholas Ludwig of Zinzendorf (1700-1760)
- Bibiane Henriette (1702-1745), married in 1741 with Baron George Adolph Marschall of Bieberstein
- Sophie Albertine Dorothea (1703-1708)
- Ernestine Eleanor (1706-1766)
