= Heinrich XXIX, Count of Reuss-Ebersdorf =

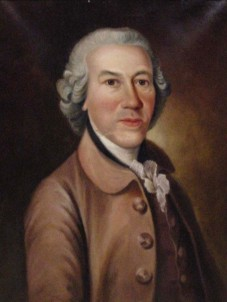
- Born: 21 July 1699; Ebersdorf
- Died: 22 May 1747 (aged 47); Herrnhaag
- Noble family: House of Reuss
- Spouse: Sophie Theodora of Castell-Remlingen
- Father: Heinrich X, Count of Reuss-Ebersdorf
- Mother: Erdmuthe Benigna of Solms-Laubach

Heinrich XXIX, Count of Reuss-Ebersdorf (born 21 July 1699 in Ebersdorf; died: 22 May 1747 in Herrnhaag) was a member of the House of Reuss Younger Line and Count Ebersdorf from 1711 until his death in 1747.

== Life ==
Heinrich was the son of Count Heinrich X Reuss of Ebersdorf and Countess Erdmuthe Benigna of Solms-Laubach (1670–1732). They raised Heinrich strictly according to the guidelines of the Pietism. Heinrich soon befriended Count Nicholas Ludwig von Zinzendorf. He married on 7 September 1721 in Castell with Sophie Theodora (1703–1777), daughter of Count Dietrich Wolfgang of Castell-Remlingen and Countess Dorothea Renata of Zinzendorf (1669–1743). At Heinrich's wedding, Count Nicholas Ludwig met Heinrich's sister, Erdmuthe Dorothea. They married exactly one year later.

Under Count Heinrich XXIX, a Moravian Church was founded in Ebersdorf, after the model of the church von Zinzendorf had founded in Upper Lusatia at Herrnhut. Because class differences were largely eliminated in this church, the whole village met in the ballroom of the palace to pray and sing hymns. The Count and his servants were to treat each other as "brothers" while in church.

== Issue ==
Count Heinrich XXIX and his wife, Countess Sophie Theodora of Castell-Remlingen had thirteen children:

- Renate Benigna (1722–1747)
- Heinrich XXIV (1724–1779), Count of Reuss-Ebersdorf
- Heinrich XXVI (1725–1796)
- Heinrich XXVIII (30 August 1726 – 10 May 1797), married Agnes Sophie of Promnitz (1720–1791), daughter of Erdmann II of Promnitz
- Sophie Auguste (1728–1753), married 1748, Baron Ludwig von Weitelfshausen
- Charlotte Louise (1729–1792)
- Heinrich XXXI (1731–1763)
- Heinrich XXXII (born: 1733, killed in the Battle of Lobositz on 1 October 1756)
- Heinrich XXXIII (1734–1791)
- Heinrich XXXIV (1737–1806)
- Christiane Eleonore (1739–1761)
- Mary Elizabeth (1740–1784), married in 1765 Heinrich XXV, Count of Reuss-Lobenstein
- Johanna Dorothea (1743–1801) married in 1770 Christoph Friedrich Levin von Trotha
