= Zinzendorf family =

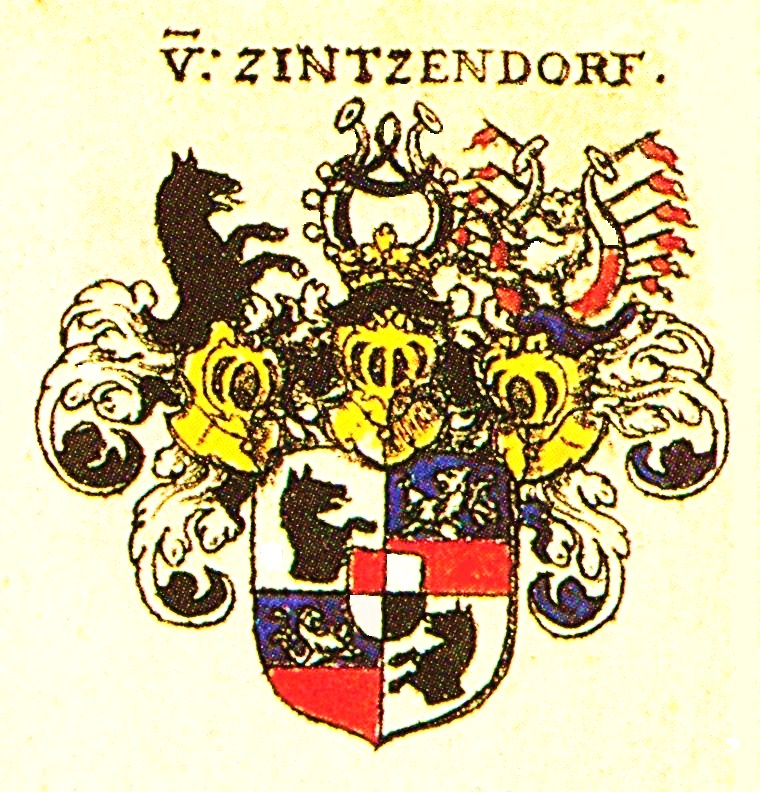
Coat of arms of the House of Zinzendorf, belonging to an old Austrian nobility, (1605)

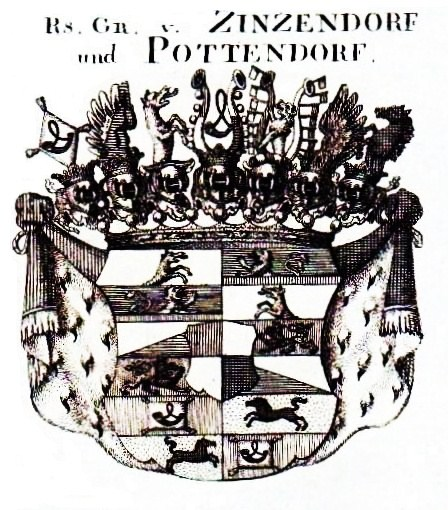
Coat of arms of the Counts von Zinzendorf and Pottendorf (circa 1780)

The House of Zinzendorf and Pottendorf was an old noble family originating in Lower Austria, documented from the High Middle Ages and later elevated to the rank of Imperial Counts of the Holy Roman Empire. The family belonged to the regional landed nobility of the Austrian duchies and is recorded in standard works of Austrian noble genealogy and heraldry. It is not to be confused with the princely House of Sinzendorf, as these two families do not share the same ancestry.

== History ==
The earliest documented ancestor of the family appears in 1114, in a document written by Hermann von Vohburg, Bishop of Augsburg, when a nobleman named Wisint de Cincendorf is mentioned as a witness in ecclesiastical charters. Further documentary references during the 12th century indicate the family’s continuous presence among the ministerial and landed nobility of Lower Austria.

The family’s early seat was located at Zinsenhof near present-day Ruprechtshofen in Lower Austria. Over subsequent centuries, members of the family held estates and lordships in Lower Austria and participated in regional administration under both the Babenberg and later Habsburg dynasties. At first, their estates were all near St. Poelten which is roughly between Vienna and Salzburg. Through marriage with the noble house of Pottendorf, the family adopted the combined name Zinzendorf und Pottendorf. Apart from their possessions in Austria, they also reigned over the Lordship of Pottendorf in Baden, which was incorporated into their name as Zinzendorf und Pottendorf.

In 1460, members of the family were elevated to the rank Baron by Frederick III, Holy Roman Emperor. On 16 November 1662 the family was raised to the dignity of Imperial Count (Reichsgraf) by Leopold I, Holy Roman Emperor.

== Association with the Apostelgeschlechter tradition ==
In early modern and 19th-century Austrian noble historiography, ancient noble families established during the Babenberg period were sometimes described as belonging to the so-called Apostelgeschlechter (“Apostle families”). Within this historiographical tradition, the lords of Zinzendorf are included among these old noble houses, such as Starhemberg, Liechtenstein, Salm, Fürstenberg, Collalto, Abensberg-Traun, Stubenberg etc. Modern scholarship treats this designation as a traditional and symbolic classification rather than a formally defined or legally binding group.

== Religious developments ==
During the Reformation, parts of the family adopted Lutheran Protestantism, which led to emigration from the Habsburg hereditary lands during the Counter-Reformation. Protestant branches settled primarily in Franconia and Saxony, where they retained noble status under territorial rulers. Nevertheless they made sure that at least one member of the family remained Catholic in order to look after their vast estates back in Austria.

== Notable members ==
- Countess Erdmuthe Dorothea von Zinzendorf und Pottendorf (1700-1756), German Pietist and hymn writer
- Countess Anna von Zinzendorf und Pottendorf (1715-1760), Moravian Brethren missionary (Missionarin) and lyrical poet
- Count Christian Renatus von Zinzendorf und Pottendorf, Leader of the Moravian Church (died 1752)
- Count Karl von Zinzendorf und Pottendorf (died 1813), official in the Austrian government and diarist
- Count Nicolaus Ludwig von Zinzendorf und Pottendorf (died 1760), European religious and social reformer

== Properties of Zinzendorf und Pottendorf family ==
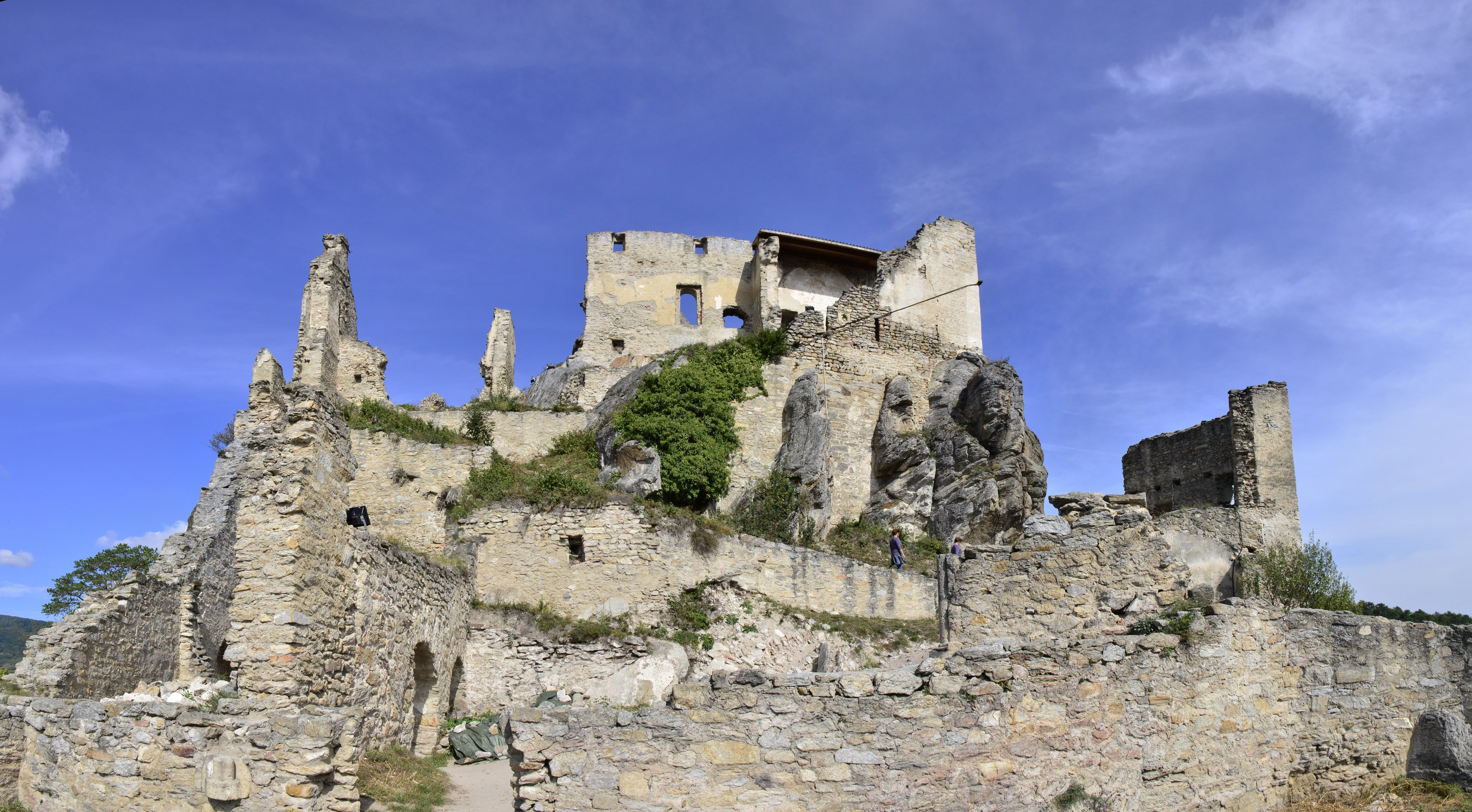
Burgruine Dürnstein, Wachau

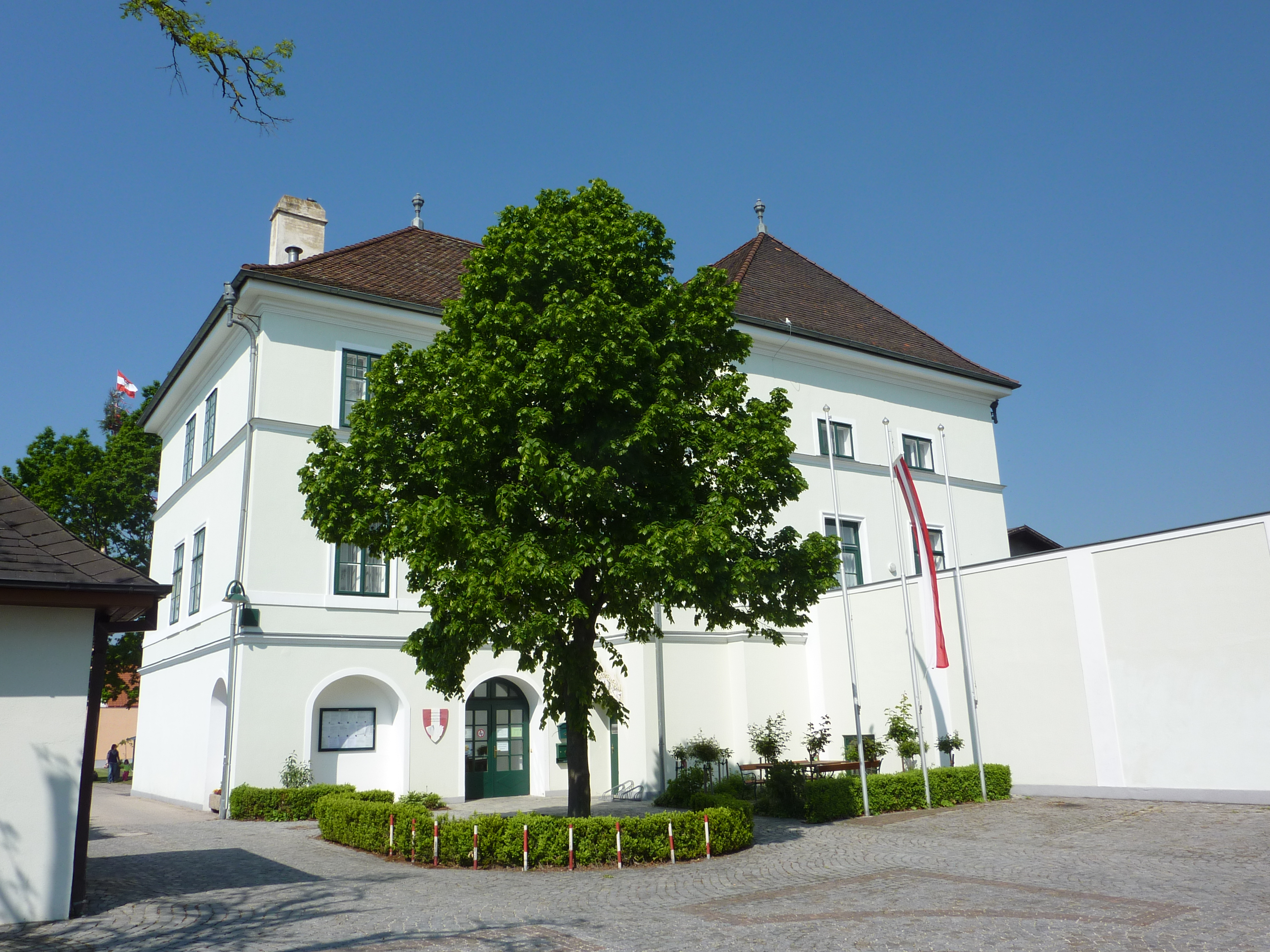
Castle Karlstetten, Lower Austria

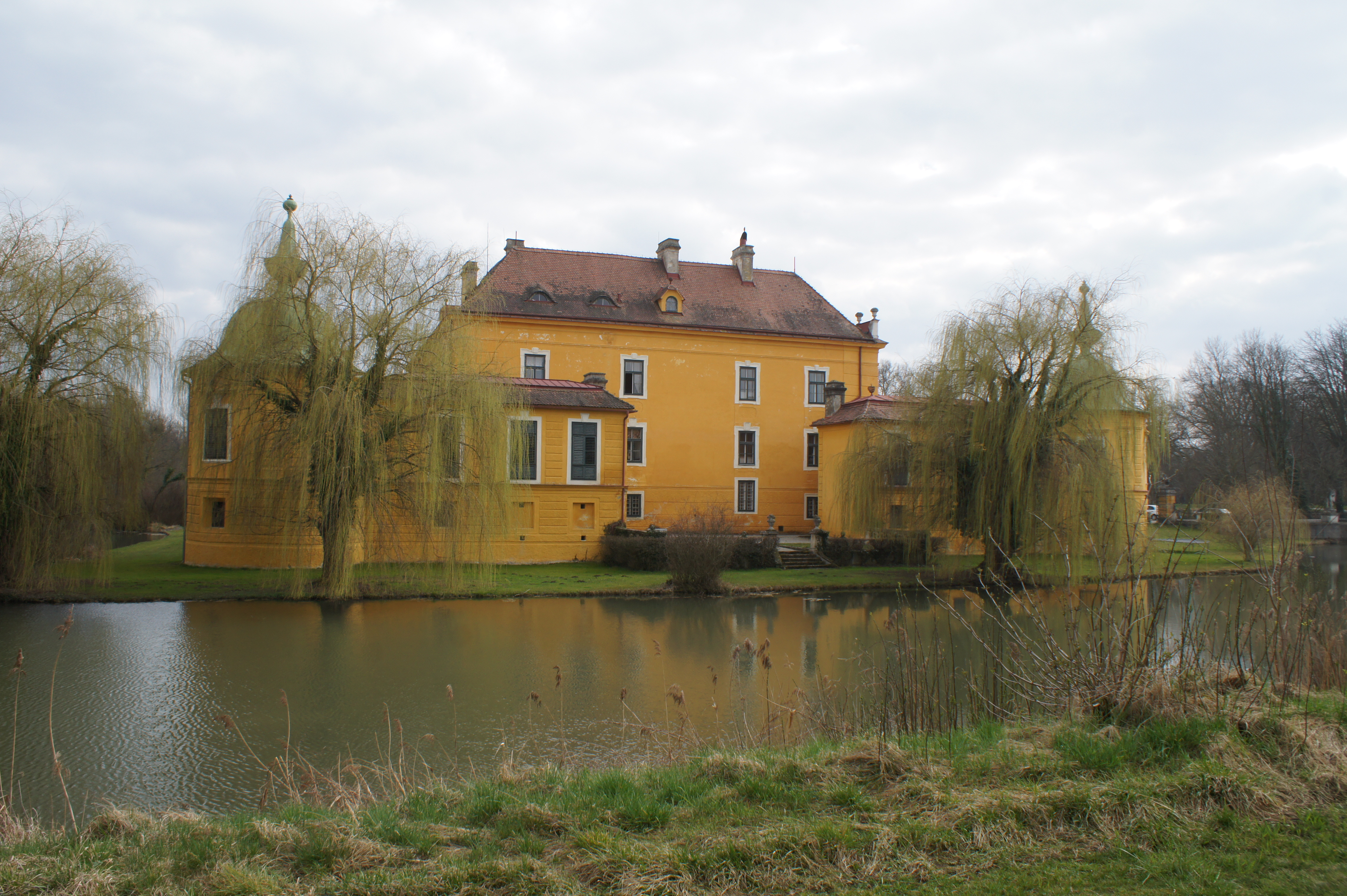
Castle Wasserburg, Austria

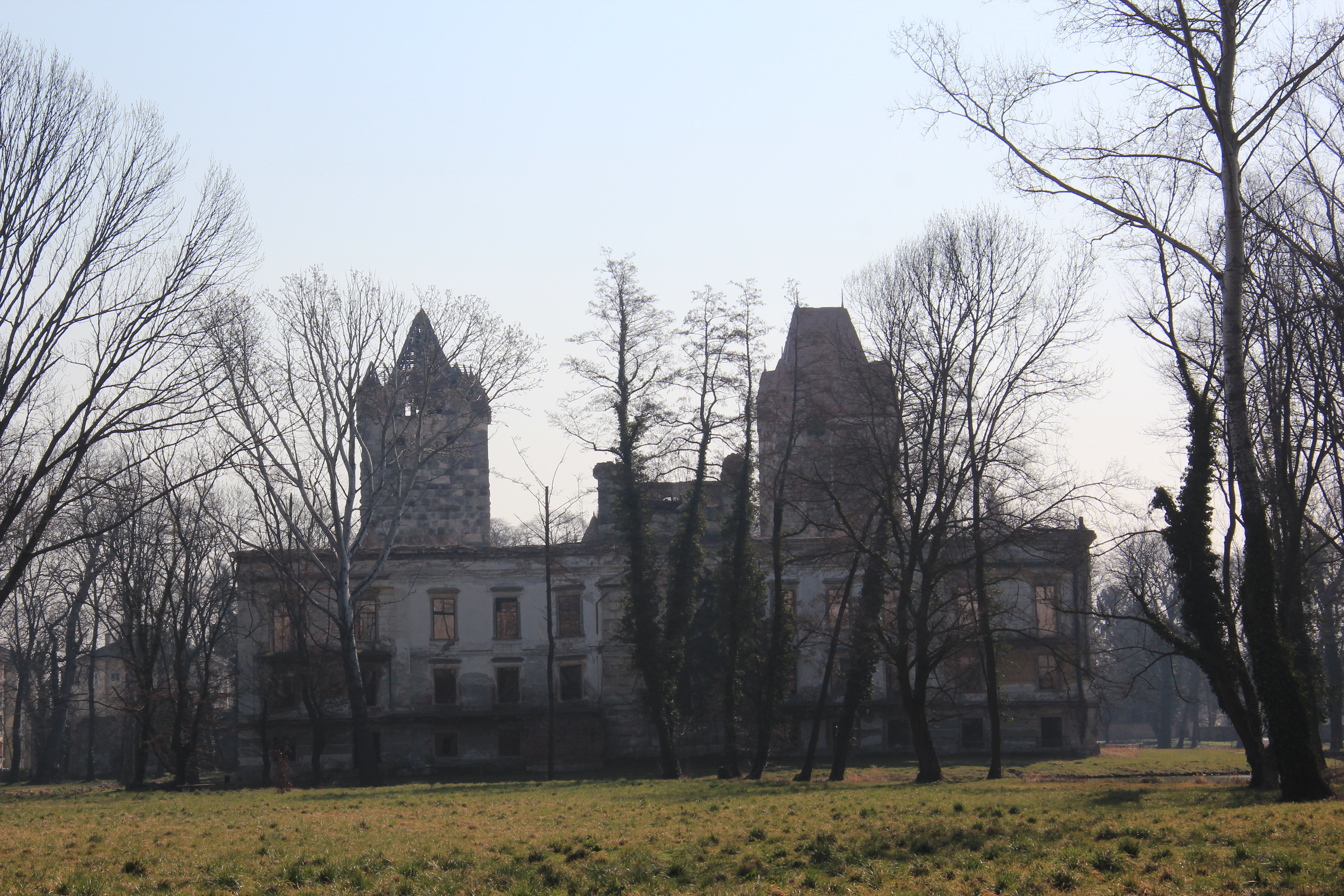
Castle Pottendorf, Baden

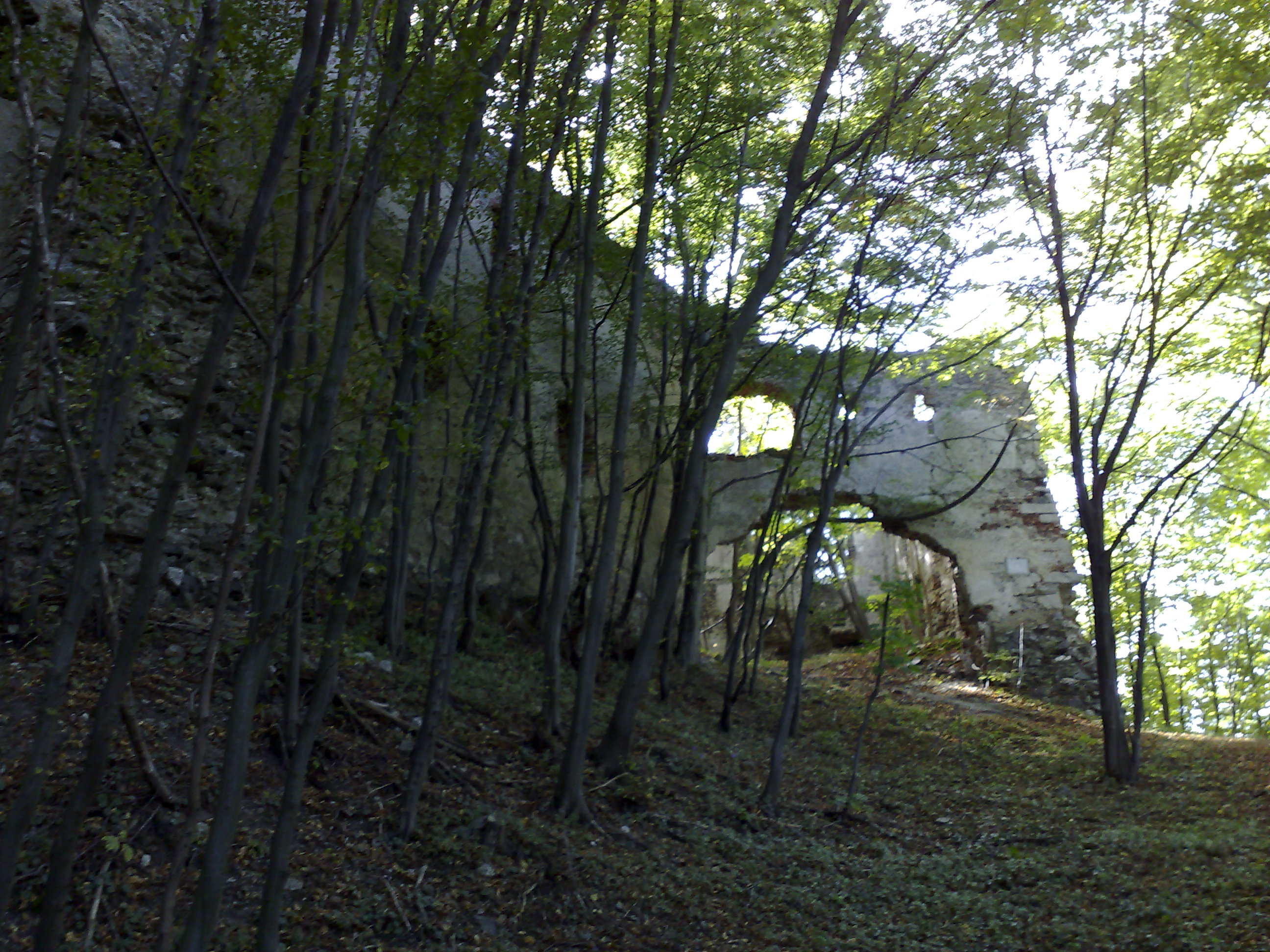
Burg Schwarzenbach, Lower Austria

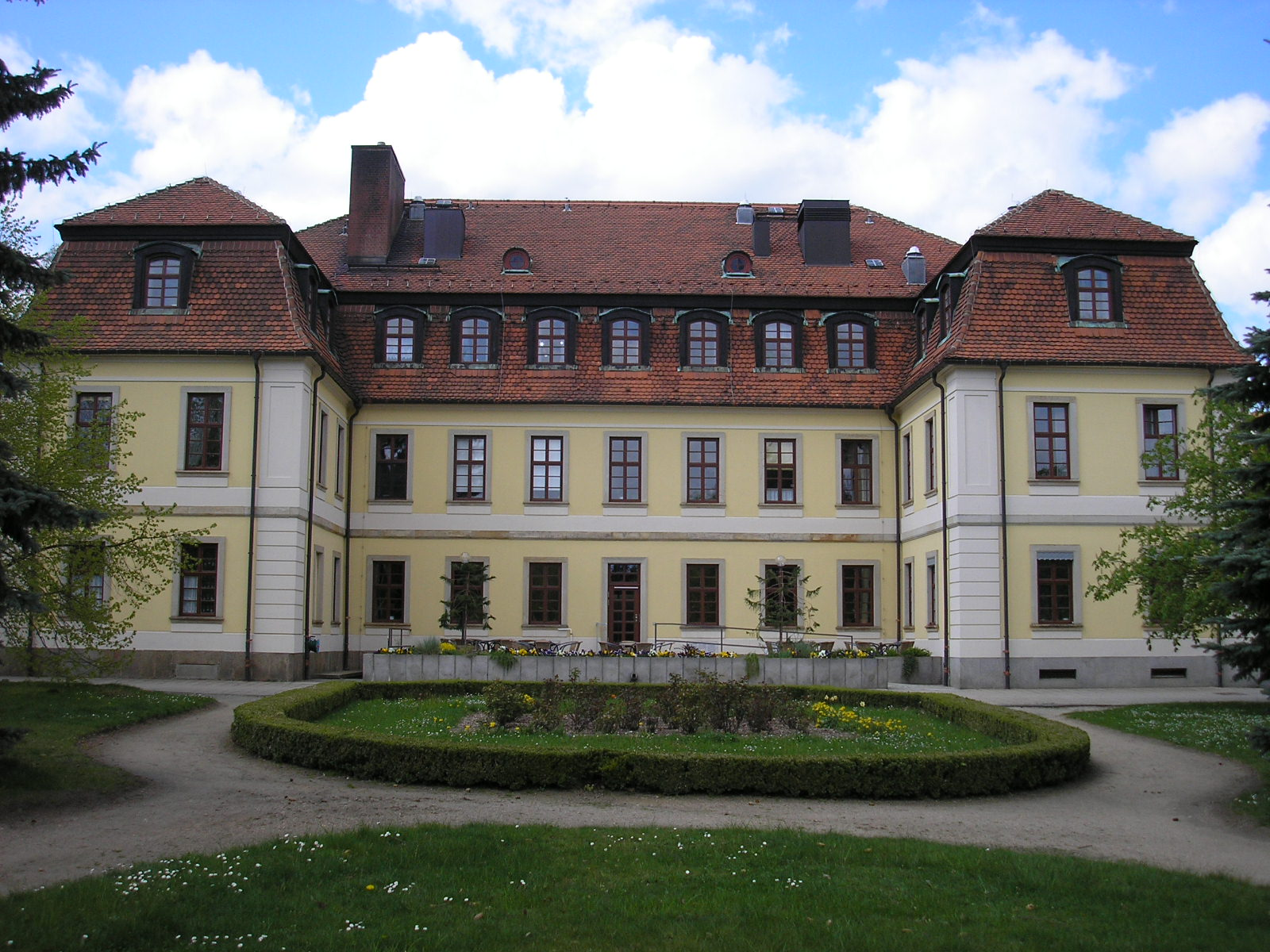
Herrnhut palace, Saxony

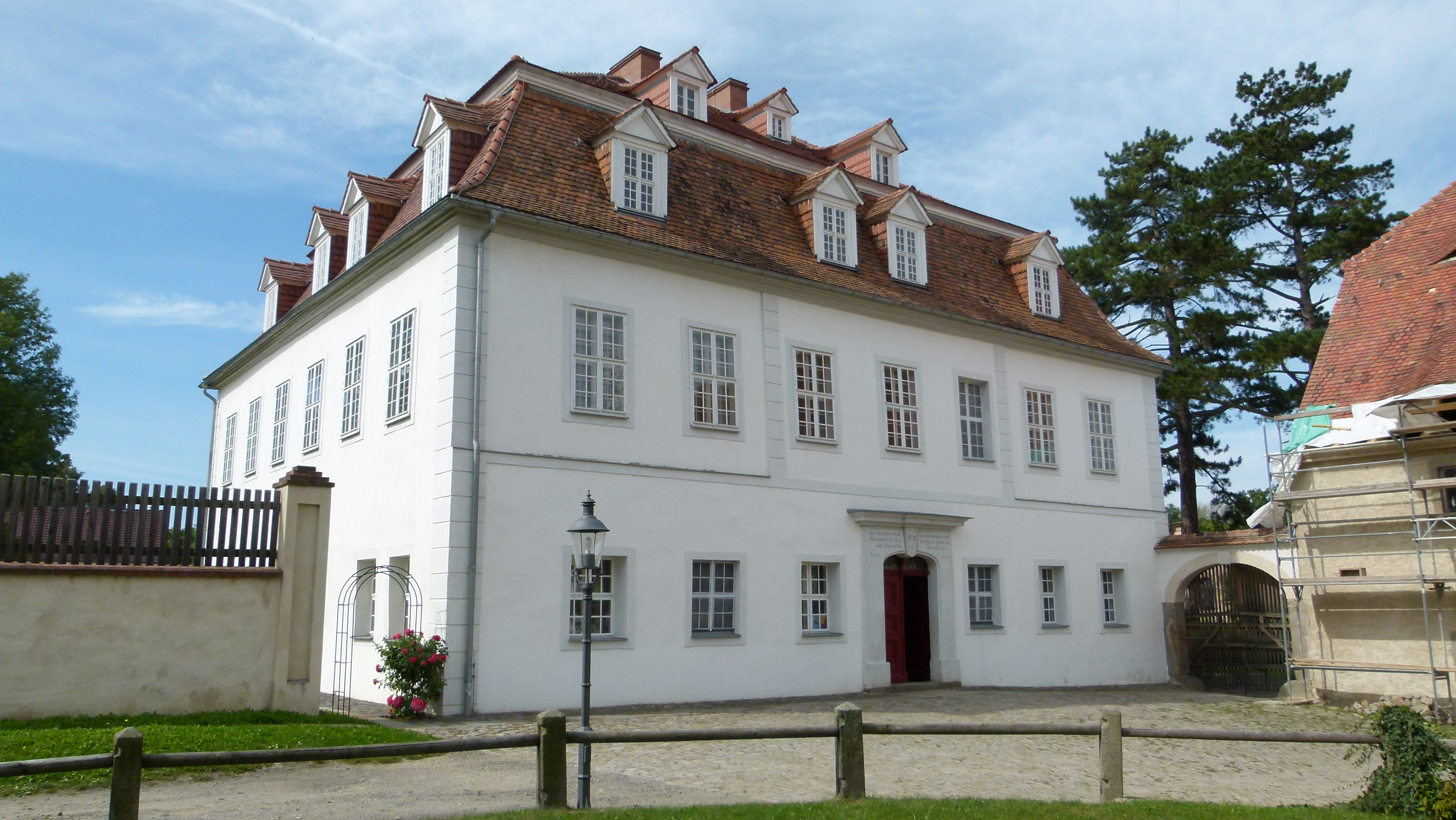
Berthelsdorf castle, Saxony

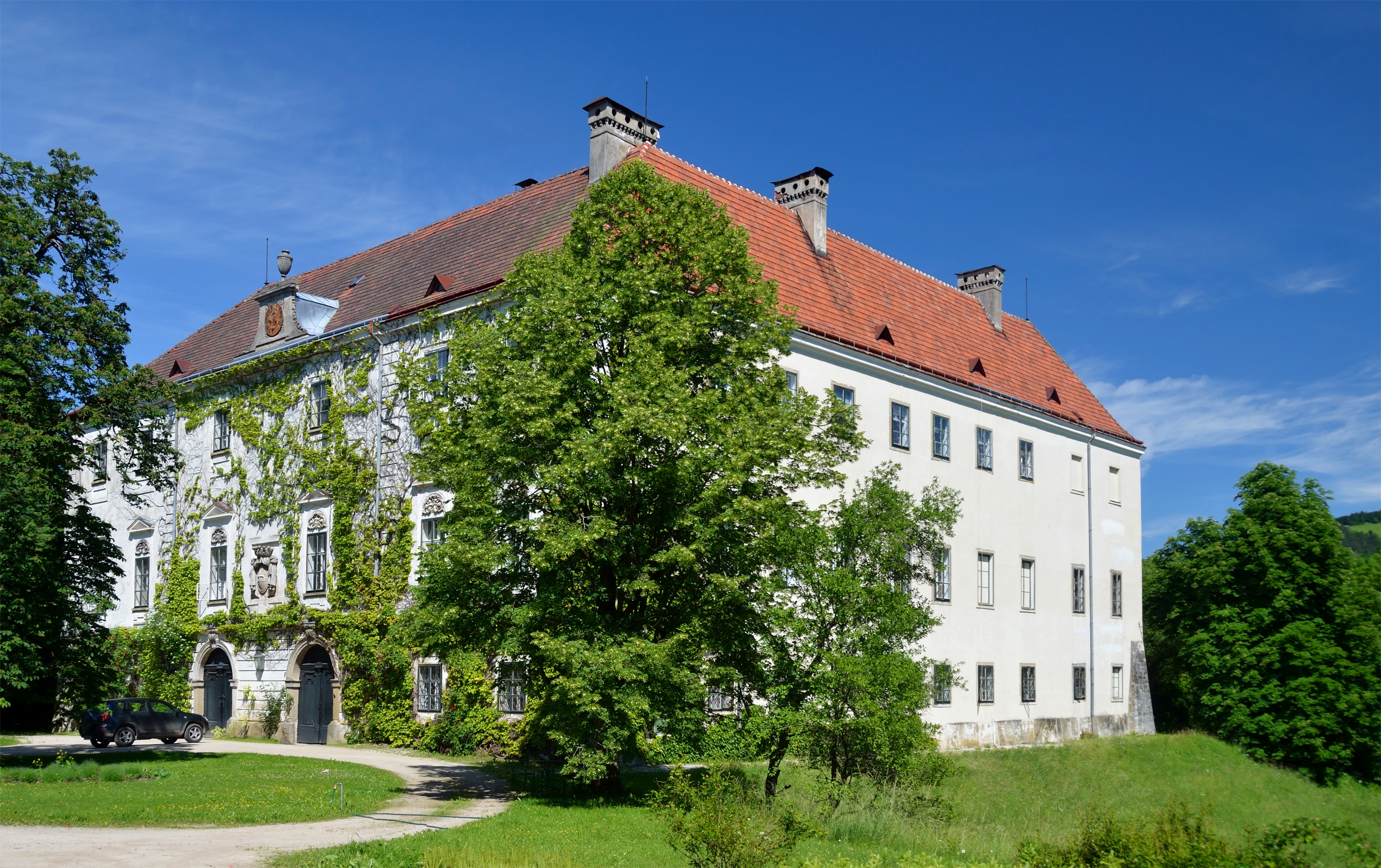
Schloss Stiebar, Lower Austria
