= Wolfgang Dietrich, Count of Castell-Remlingen =

German nobleman (1641–1709)

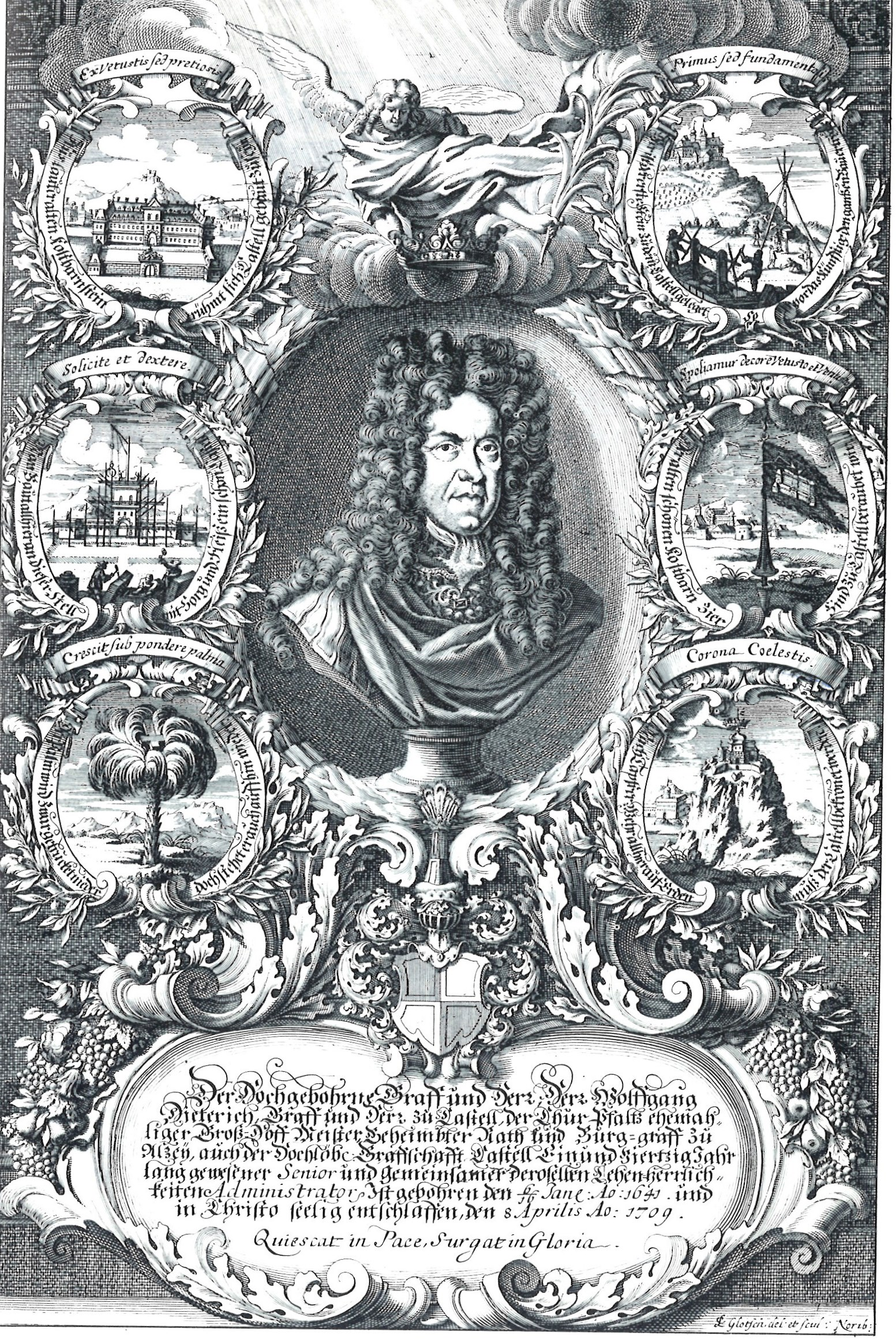
Print of Wolfgang Dietrich by Ludwig Christoph Glotsch, 1709.

Wolfgang Dietrich of Castell-Remlingen (German - Wolfgang Dietrich zu Castell-Remlingen) (6 January 1641 – 8 April 1709) was a German nobleman. From 1668 until his death he was the ruler of the county of Castell-Remlingen, sharing power with his brother Friedrich Magnus of Castell-Remlingen. He also held other offices in the Margraviate of Ansbach and the Electoral Palatinate.

== Life ==
He was born in Remlingen, Bavaria. He died in Castell, aged 68.

== Marriages and issue ==
In Remlingen on 7 July 1667 he married Elisabeth Dorothea Schenkin of Limpurg in Obersontheim. With her he had six children, two of whom died in infancy:

- Sophie Dorothea (* 21 June 1668 in Remlingen; † 25 December 1732 in Castell)
- Christiana Theodora (* 12 June 1669 in Remlingen; † 15 August 1674 in Neustadt an der Aisch)
- Charlotte Juliane (* 14 September 1670 in Castell; † 5 February 1696 in Rüdenhausen)
- Luise Florina (* 16 April 1672 in Castell; † 27 July 1676 in Castell)
- Christiana Elisabeth (* 21 June 1674 in Neustadt; † 16 March 1717 in Neuenstein)
- Karl Friedrich Gottlieb (* 16 April 1679 in Mannheim; † 9 May 1743 in Hamburg), Wolfgang Dietrich's successor.

After Elisabeth Dorothea's death, Wolfgang Dietrich married again, on 7 March 1693 to Dorothea Renate of Zinzendorf and Pottendorf. He had eight children with her:

- Eleonore Auguste Amalie (* 27 December 1693 in Castell; † 25 May 1712 in Castell)
- Wolfgang Georg (* 20 September 1694 in Castell; † 22 September 1735 in Castell)
- Charlotte Luise Renata (* 24 January 1696 in Castell; † 6 January 1699)
- Ludwig Theodor (* 2 November 1698 in Castell; † 11 December 1698 in Castell)
- Karoline Friederike Luise (* 15 May 1702 in Castell; † 17 February 1748 in Rehweiler)
- Sophie Theodora (* 12 May 1703 in Castell; † 8 January 1777 in Herrnhut)
- August Franz Friedrich (* 31 July 1705 in Castell; † 16 May 1767 in Castell)
- Ludwig Friedrich (* 23 February 1707 in Castell; † 22 June 1772 in Rehweiler)

== Bibliography ==
- Max Domarus: Die Porträts im Schloss Rüdenhausen. In: Freunde Mainfränkischer Kunst und Geschichte e.V. (ed.): Mainfränkische Hefte. Heft 46. Volkach 1966.
- Wilhelm Engel: Haus u. Herrschaft Castell in der fränkischen Geschichte. In: Gesellschaft für fränkische Geschichte (ed.): Castell. Beiträge zu Kultur und Geschichte von Haus und Herrschaft. Neujahrsblätter XXIV. Würzburg 1952. S. 1-19.
- Otto Meyer: Das Haus Castell. Landes- und Standesherrschaft im Wandel der Jahrhunderte. In: Otto Meyer, Hellmut Kunstmann (ed.): Castell. Landesherrschaft- Burgen- Standesherrschaft. Castell 1979. S. 9-53.
