= Reuss-Lobenstein =

State located in the German part of the Holy Roman Empire

Lordship (County, Principality) of Reuss-Lobenstein Herrschaft (Grafschaft, Fürstentum) Reuß-Lobenstein
- 1425–1547; 1647–1824
- Flag Coat of arms

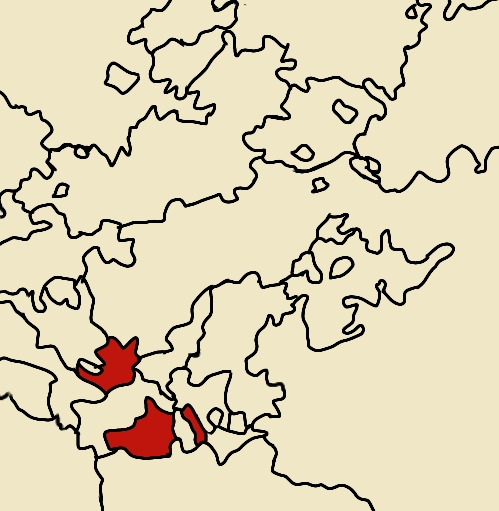
- in red Reuss-Lobenstein
- Status: State of the Holy Roman Empire, then State of the Confederation of the Rhine
- Capital: Lobenstein
- Government: Principality
- Historical era: Early Modern Age
  - Partitioned from Reuß-Gera: 1425
  - Annexed to Reuß-Plauen: 1547 1425
  - Re-created by partition from Reuß-Schleiz: 1647
  - Raised to county: 1673
  - Partitioned to create Reuß-Hirschberg and Reuß-Ebersdorf: 1678
  - Partitioned to create Reuß-Selbitz: 1710–1805
  - Raised to principality: 1790 1824
  - Inherited by R-Ebersdorf: 1824
Preceded by	Succeeded by
Reuß-Gera; Reuß-Schleiz	Reuß-Plauen; Reuß-Lobenstein-Ebersdorf

Reuss-Lobenstein (German: Reuß-Lobenstein) was a state located in the German part of the Holy Roman Empire.

== History ==
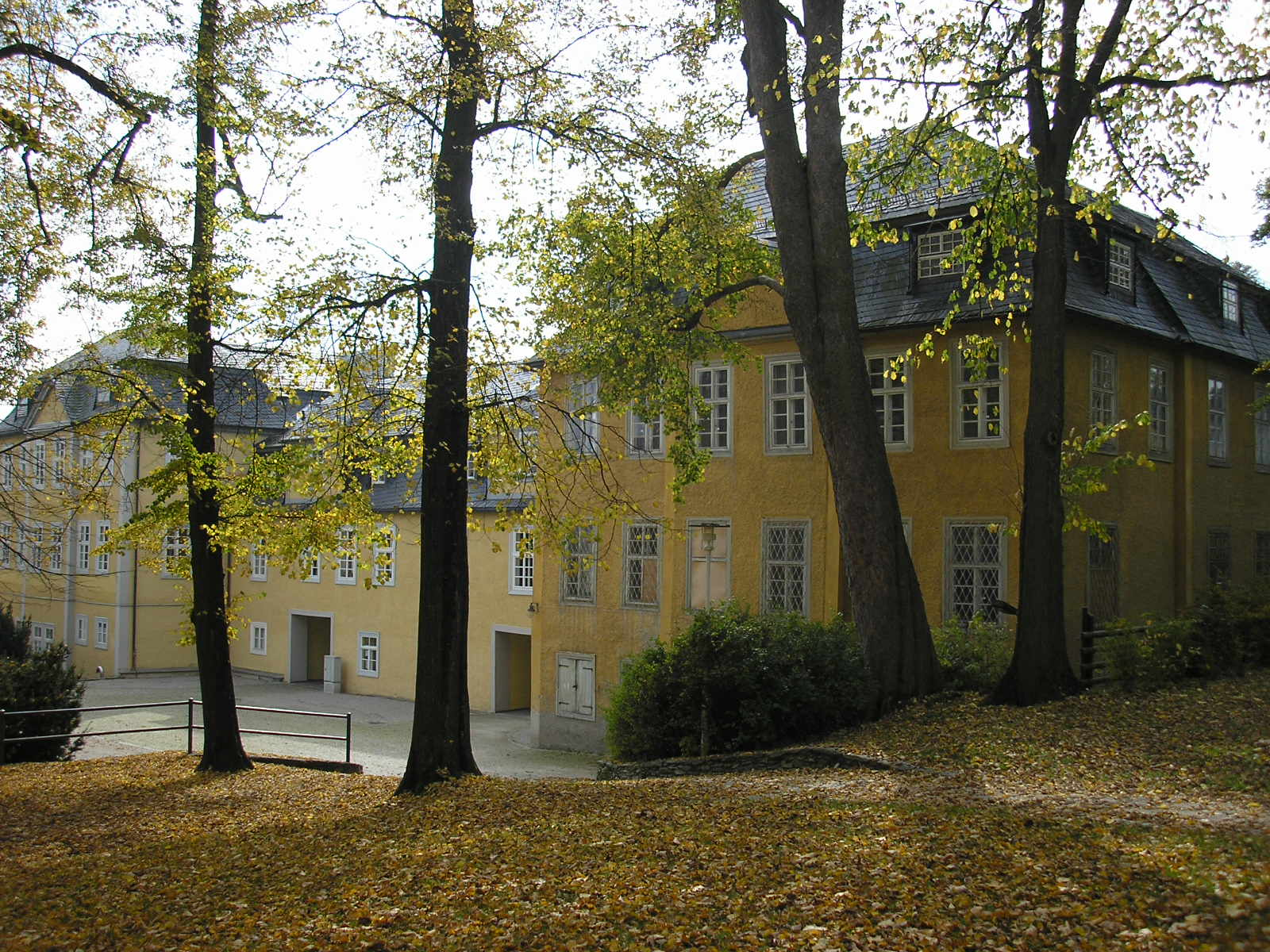
Schloss Lobenstein from the garden.

The members of Reuss-Lobenstein family belonged to the Reuss Junior Line. Reuss-Lobenstein has existed on two occasions, it was firstly created in 1425 as a lordship with Heinrich II, Lord of Reuss-Lobenstein becoming the first ruler. The first Lordship of Reuss-Lobenstein came to an end in 1547 when the territory went to Reuss-Plauen.

Reuss-Lobenstein was recreated in 1647 again as a lordship which it remained until 1673 when the title of lord was upgraded to count. Following the death of Count Henry X in 1671, Reuss-Lobenstein was ruled jointly by his three sons Heinrich III, Heinrich VIII and Heinrich X. In 1678 Reuss-Lobenstein was partitioned with Heinrich III remaining Count of Reuss-Lobenstein, Heinrich VIII becoming Count of Reuss-Hirschberg and Heinrich X becoming the Count of Reuss-Ebersdorf. Reuss-Lobenstein was partitioned for a second time in 1710 following the death of Heinrich III with Reuss-Selbitz being created for a younger son Heinrich XXVI while his eldest son Heinrich XV succeeded him as count of Reuss-Lobenstein.

Reuss-Lobenstein was raised to a principality in 1790 and joined the Confederation of the Rhine on 15 December 1806. With the death of Prince Heinrich LIV in 1824 the Reuss-Lobenstein line became extinct and was inherited by the Prince of Reuss-Ebersdorf.

== Rulers of Reuss-Lobenstein ==
=== Lords of Reuss-Lobenstein, 1425–1547 ===
- Heinrich II, 1425–70
- Heinrich I, 1482–87
- Heinrich II, 1482–1500, with
  - Heinrich III, 1482–1498
- Heinrich I, 1500–38, with
  - Heinrich II, 1500–1547

To Reuss-Plauen, 1547

=== Lords of Reuss-Lobenstein 1647–1673 ===
- Heinrich X, 1647–71
- Heinrich III, 1671–1710, with
  - Heinrich VIII, 1671–73 and
  - Heinrich X, 1671–73

Raised to county, 1673

=== Counts of Reuss-Lobenstein (1673–1790) ===
- Heinrich III, 1673–1710, with
  - Heinrich VIII (count of Reuss-Hirschberg from 1678), 1673–78 and
  - Heinrich X (count of Reuss-Ebersdorf from 1678), 1673–78
- Heinrich XV, 1710–39
- Heinrich II, 1739–82
- Heinrich XXXV, 1782–90

Raised to principality, 1790

=== Princes of Reuss-Lobenstein (1790–1824) ===
- Heinrich XXXV, 1790–1805
- Heinrich LIV, 1805–24

To Reuss-Ebersdorf, 1824
