= Reuss-Ebersdorf =

County, later principality of the Holy Roman Empire and the Confederation of the Rhine

County (Principality) of Reuss-Ebersdorf County of Reuss-Ebersdorf (1678–1806) Grafschaft Reuß-Ebersdorf Grafschaft (Fürstentum) Reuß-Ebersdorf
- 1678–1824
- Flag Coat of arms

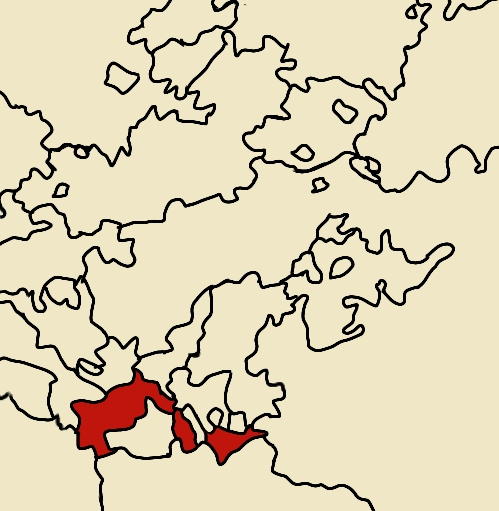
- Status: State of the Holy Roman Empire, then State of the Confederation of the Rhine
- Capital: Ebersdorf
- Government: Principality
- Historical era: Modern era
  - Partitioned from Reuß-Lobenstein: 1678
  - Raised to principality: 1806
  - Inherited R-Lobenstein: 7 May 1824
Preceded by	Succeeded by
Reuss-Lobenstein	Reuss-Lobenstein-Ebersdorf

Reuss-Ebersdorf was a county and from 1806 a principality located in Germany. The Counts of Reuss-Ebersdorf belonged to the Reuss Junior Line. Reuss was successively a part of the Holy Roman Empire, Confederation of the Rhine, German Confederation, North German Confederation and German Empire.

== History ==
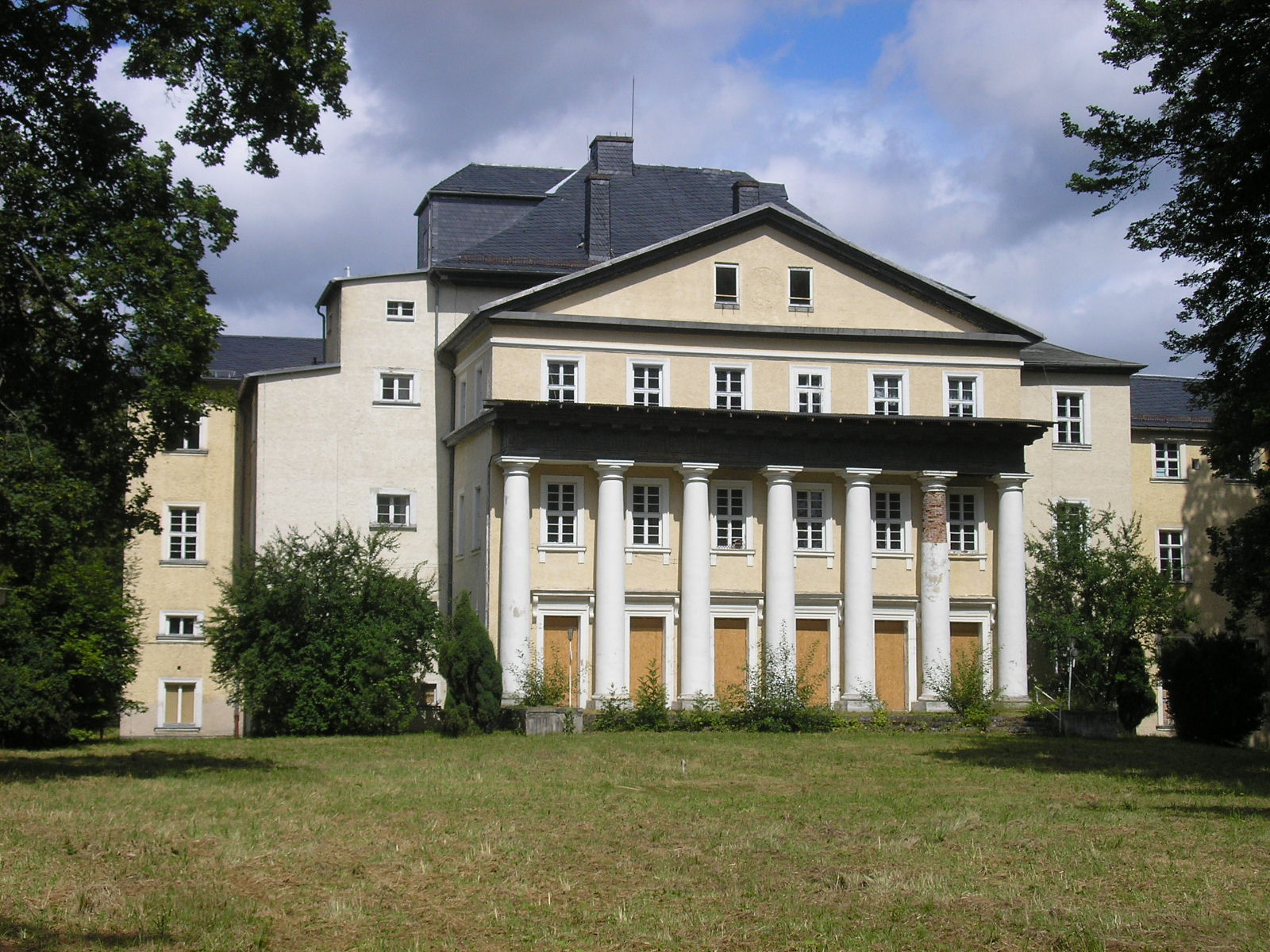
Residenz Schloss Ebersdorf, from the park.

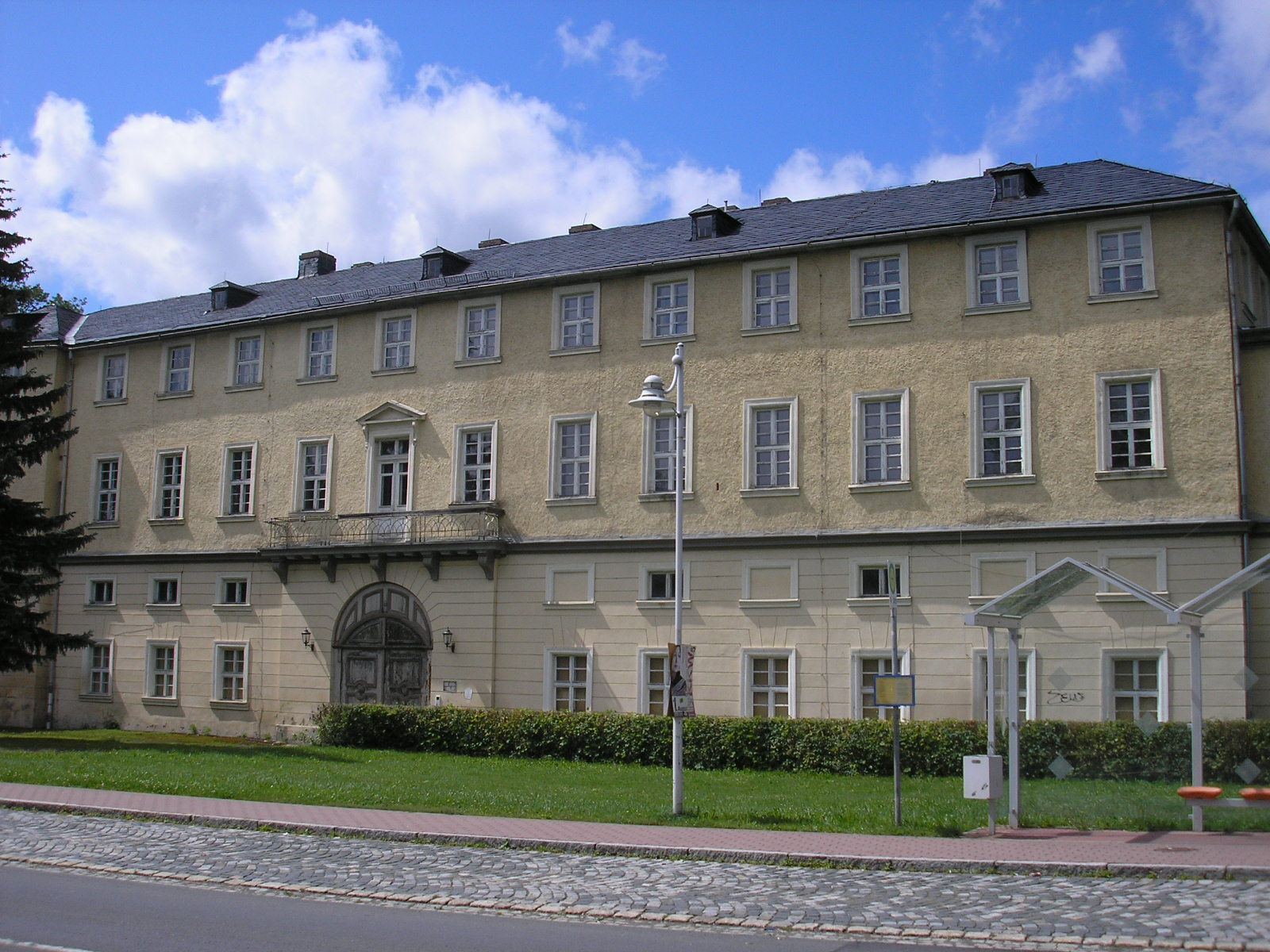
Residenz Schloss Ebersdorf.

Following the death of Count Heinrich X of Reuss-Lobenstein in 1671, Reuss-Lobenstein was ruled jointly by his three sons Heinrich III, Heinrich VIII and Heinrich X. In 1678 Reuss-Lobenstein was partitioned with Heinrich III remaining Count of Reuss-Lobenstein, Heinrich VIII becoming Count of Reuss-Hirschberg and Heinrich X becoming the Count of Reuss-Ebersdorf.

In 1806 the title of the ruler of Reuss-Ebersdorf was upgraded to that of prince.

== Rulers of Reuss-Ebersdorf ==
=== Counts of Reuss-Ebersdorf (1678–1806) ===
- Heinrich X, 1678–1711
- Heinrich XXIX, 1711–47
- Heinrich XXIV, 1747–79
- Heinrich LI, 1779–1806

Raised to principality, 1806

=== Princes of Reuss-Ebersdorf (1806–24) ===
- Heinrich LI, 1806–22
- Heinrich LXXII, 1822–24

Succeeded as Prince Reuss of Lobenstein and Ebersdorf, 1824
