= John Conroy (disambiguation) =

John Conroy (1786–1854) was a British army officer and comptroller to the Duchess of Kent and Princess Victoria, future Queen of the United Kingdom.

John Conroy may also refer to:

- Sir John Conroy, 3rd Baronet (1845–1900), English analytical chemist
- John Conroy (field hockey) (1928–1985), British field hockey player
- John Conroy (trade unionist) (1904–1969), Irish trade union leader
- John H. Conroy (1893–1966), American lawyer and politician from New York
- John J. Conroy (1819–1895), Irish-born clergyman of the Roman Catholic Church
- John M. Conroy (1920–1979), American aircraft designer
- Jack Conroy, leftist American writer
