= The Young Victoria =

2009 film by Jean-Marc Vallée

- Theatrical release poster
- Directed by: Jean-Marc Vallée
- Written by: Julian Fellowes
- Produced by: Martin Scorsese; Graham King; Timothy Headington; Sarah Ferguson
- Starring: Emily Blunt; Rupert Friend; Paul Bettany; Miranda Richardson; Jim Broadbent; Thomas Kretschmann; Mark Strong; Jesper Christensen; Harriet Walter
- Cinematography: Hagen Bogdanski
- Edited by: Jill Bilcock; Matt Garner
- Music by: Ilan Eshkeri
- Production companies: GK Films; Sikelia Productions
- Distributed by: Momentum Pictures
- Release dates: 5 February 2009 (Berlin); 6 March 2009 (United Kingdom)
- Running time: 105 minutes
- Country: United Kingdom
- Language: English
- Budget: £35 million
- Box office: $31.9 million

The Young Victoria is a 2009 British biographical film directed by Jean-Marc Vallée and written by Julian Fellowes, based on the early life and reign of Queen Victoria, and her marriage to Prince Albert of Saxe-Coburg and Gotha. Produced by Graham King, Martin Scorsese, Sarah Ferguson, and Timothy Headington, the film stars Emily Blunt, Rupert Friend, Paul Bettany, Miranda Richardson, Harriet Walter, Mark Strong, and Jim Broadbent among a large ensemble cast.

As screenwriter, Fellowes sought to make the film as historically accurate as possible. With this in mind, Oscar-winning costume designer Sandy Powell and historical consultant Alastair Bruce were hired, and filming for The Young Victoria took place at various historical landmarks in England to further the film's authenticity. Despite this, some aspects of the film have been criticised for their historical inaccuracies.

Momentum Pictures released the film in the United Kingdom on 6 March 2009. Critical reception was generally positive, but the film grossed $31.9 million against a $35 million budget.

== Plot ==
Princess Alexandrina Victoria of Kent, the heiress presumptive to the British throne during the reign of her paternal uncle, King William IV, is subject to a political tug of war for influence over her. On one side is her mother, Victoria, Duchess of Kent, and the comptroller of the Duchess's household, Sir John Conroy, who oppressively bring her up under the Kensington system. When it becomes clear that Victoria will become Queen, they try to force her to sign papers declaring a regency if she ascends the throne before coming of age, the provision remaining in effect until she is twenty-five years old.

On the other side is her maternal uncle, King Leopold I of Belgium, who uses family ties to secure an alliance between the United Kingdom and Belgium. He wants his nephew Prince Albert of Saxe-Coburg and Gotha, who is Victoria's cousin, to marry her. Albert is coached in Victoria's likes and dislikes. When the Duchess invites the Coburg brothers, Albert and Prince Ernest of Saxe-Coburg and Gotha, to visit, Victoria and Albert develop a mutual fondness, despite her knowing that their uncle sent him to court her. They begin writing to each other after he returns home.

At a birthday reception in Windsor Castle, King William states his wish to be closer to Victoria and insults her mother. When he increases Victoria's income, it is rejected by Conroy, who physically subdues her in front of her mother, heightening their animosity. The King then sends the Prime Minister Lord Melbourne to advise her. Victoria agrees to make Melbourne her private secretary, and he appoints her ladies-in-waiting who are from families politically allied to the Whigs.

King William dies shortly after Victoria's eighteenth birthday, thus avoiding a regency. Now Queen, Victoria immediately exerts her independence, physically distancing herself from her mother and banishing Conroy from her household and coronation. During her first meeting with the Privy Council, Victoria announces her intention to devote her life to serving her country and its people. She moves into the newly built Buckingham Palace and expresses a sense of freedom for the first time. Her aunt, the dowager Queen Adelaide, advises her against acquiescing too much in Lord Melbourne's directives. Albert visits again, and he and Victoria further bond while discussing their mutual interest in social issues. She resists a more intimate relationship, however, and he leaves.

Melbourne resigns as Prime Minister after losing the confidence of the House of Commons, forcing Victoria to invite the Leader of the Opposition Robert Peel to form a government in his place. With a minority in Commons, he requests to replace some of Victoria's ladies-in-waiting with supporters of the Tories. When Victoria refuses, Peel rejects her invitation to form a new government, leading her to invite Melbourne to continue as Prime Minister. The subsequent crisis damages Victoria's popularity, leading to demonstrations outside the palace. The turbulence draws Victoria closer to Albert through their letters and she invites him back to Britain. Protocol prevents him from proposing marriage, so she asks him.

Their short honeymoon is loving, but Albert soon grows frustrated at his powerlessness. Queen Adelaide advises Victoria to allow him to assume more duties. He then reorganises the royal household and dismisses Conroy for mishandling the Duchess of Kent's funds. As Victoria's primary adviser, Albert blocks Lord Melbourne and King Leopold from influencing his wife. However, he and Victoria fiercely quarrel after Albert goes over her head to Peel about replacing some of her ladies-in-waiting. But when an anarchist attempts to shoot Victoria during an open-carriage ride, Albert is wounded when he shields her. His bravery leads to their reconciliation, and Melbourne urges her to share her work for social welfare with Albert. Their first child's birth helps reconcile Victoria and her mother, who had earlier sent a letter of support during the crisis.

The final title cards sketch Victoria and Albert's successful future together until his death, aged forty-two. Victoria lives on until her death at eighty-one, ever loyal to his memory and having reigned for sixty-three years.

== Cast ==
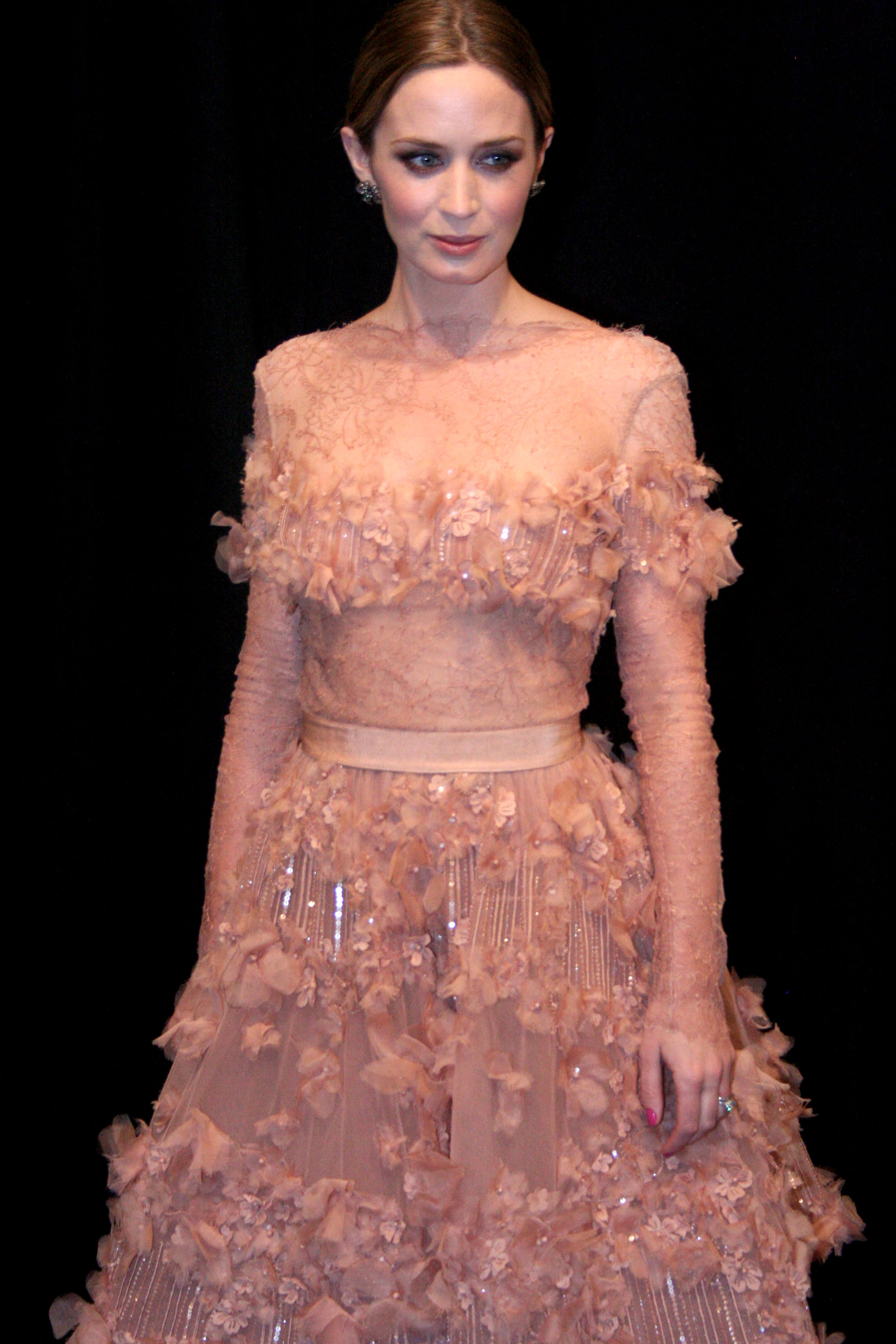
Emily Blunt starred as Queen Victoria.

- Emily Blunt as Queen Victoria
- Rupert Friend as Prince Albert of Saxe-Coburg and Gotha
- Paul Bettany as William Lamb, 2nd Viscount Melbourne
- Miranda Richardson as Princess Victoria, Duchess of Kent and Strathearn
- Jim Broadbent as King William IV
- Thomas Kretschmann as King Leopold I of the Belgians
- Mark Strong as Sir John Ponsonby Conroy, 1st Baronet
- Jesper Christensen as Christian Friedrich, Baron Stockmar
- Harriet Walter as Queen Adelaide
- Jeanette Hain as Louise, Baroness Lehzen
- Julian Glover as Arthur Wellesley, 1st Duke of Wellington
- Michael Maloney as Sir Robert Peel, 2nd Baronet
- Michiel Huisman as Ernest II, Duke of Saxe-Coburg and Gotha
- Genevieve O'Reilly as Lady Flora Hastings
- Rachael Stirling as Harriet Sutherland-Leveson-Gower, Duchess of Sutherland
- Josef Altin as Edward Oxford
- David Robb as John Russell, 1st Earl Russell

== Production ==
=== Development ===
It was Sarah, Duchess of York, who conceived the idea for a film based upon the early years of Queen Victoria. She had been interested in the queen since her marriage to Prince Andrew, Duke of York, a great-great-great-grandson of Victoria and Albert, and had written two books about her with the help of an historian. The Victoria-Albert relationship in particular drew her into the queen's history, as she believed there were parallels between their marriage and her own with Prince Andrew, as they both "fought for their love" in the midst of public scrutiny. A friend set up a meeting with producer Graham King, to whom she pitched the idea along with several others. At the time wrapping up his work on The Departed, King, a native of Britain, had been looking for a project set in his home country for years. The producer later remembered, "she pitched me a bunch of things, and among them was a three-page synopsis of Victoria's early life: the precise span covered in The Young Victoria. [After that the film] just fell into place." King brought frequent collaborator Martin Scorsese onboard initially as a co-executive producer, as the Academy Award-winning director knew "pretty much all there is to know about British history."

Gosford Park screenwriter Julian Fellowes contacted King to present ideas for a script, and according to the producer, Fellowes "seemed to have the whole movie planned out in his head so we told him to go ahead and write it. Three months later, this incredibly impressive screenplay showed up on our desks." Fellowes was immediately hired by him and Scorsese. Fellowes chose not to end the film with Albert's death because he was wary of copying "the horror of biopics," where there is simply an important event after important event. Believing it had been done before and that the audience was already familiar with that part of Victoria's history, he thought it would be better suited for a television series or for another film.

For the film's director, King wanted someone "who would steer us away from the traditional BBC-type costume drama," and "make a period film for an MTV audience." By chance, someone recommended King watch the 2005 film C.R.A.Z.Y. by French-Canadian filmmaker Jean-Marc Vallée, and became immediately interested in hiring him. King offered the job to Vallée on their very first meeting. Though at first expressing a lack of interest, Vallée agreed to direct after reading the script. He commented, "When I read the script, I saw it's a family drama, a romance, a political plot at the same time." Vallée considered Victoria to be a rebel because "she has this attitude, which is you make noise, you want to yell and yell loudly to your parents and all the people, to authority... 'I'm going to do it my way.' That's what rock 'n' roll is all about. That's what I liked about her, this energy. [Victoria] was special and had this mystical quality."

Academy Award-winning costume designer Sandy Powell heard about the script and contacted King, who in turn hired her. Powell was given access to Victoria's wedding dress and coronation robes while researching. Powell's frequent collaborator, costume cutter Annie Hadley, was hired to produce the costumes. Based upon his work on The Lives of Others and his German nationality, Hagen Bogdanski was selected as the director of photography. Fellowes enlisted his friend Alastair Bruce's help with the coronation ceremony's historical authenticity, which led to Bruce's employment as the film's historical consultant, his first film credit.

=== Writing ===
Fellowes strove to make the script free of anachronisms, to the point where he became upset when actor Jim Broadbent ad-libbed and told the Duke of Wellington to "Enjoy the meal" during a dinner scene, a phrase not proper for the time period. The writer commented, "Everything I have put into it is based entirely on fact. It just happens to be a story that not many people are familiar with." Fellowes has remarked that while he would not alter the "fundamental truth," such as the characters' real relationships to each other, he strove to "use episodes to illustrate the journey you're taking your characters, and with them, your audience."

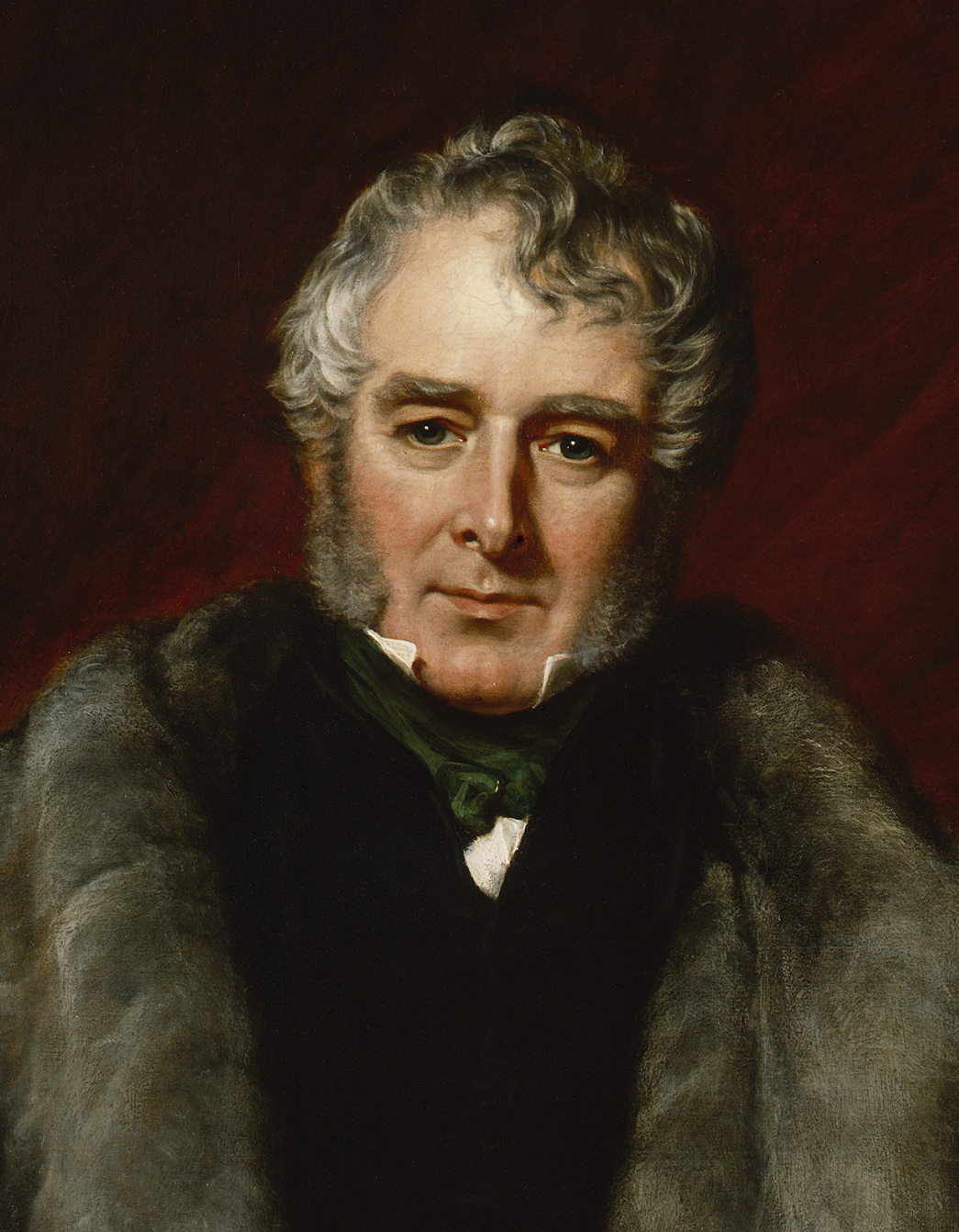
In the film, Lord Melbourne (pictured) is portrayed as a young man; he was in actuality forty years Victoria's senior.

Although largely faithful to a selection of historical facts, the film has drawn criticism for embellishing events in order to increase dramatic potential. For example, Prince Albert was never shot during an assassination attempt on Queen Victoria. Fellowes told BBC Radio 4's Film Programme that in actuality the prince did put his body before the queen as protection, and that showing Prince Albert having been grazed by the bullet in the film was added to best show his bravery and devotion as he tried to stop Queen Victoria from being shot.

Another departure from history comes during Victoria's coronation scene. Contrary to what is shown in the film, Albert (who was not yet betrothed) was not present at the ceremony; the couple instead wrote letters to each other, but Fellowes felt that having them keep opening letters would be less cinematic. Furthermore, according to Fellowes, "The scene where [Conroy] is trying to make her sign the paper when she is ill and she throws it to the floor – it's completely true," and "The scene in Windsor where the King stands up and insults Victoria's mother is not only true, but about two-thirds of his speech is what he actually said!" However, the Duchess of Kent was seated next to the King when he spoke and did not leave during the speech; and, undepicted in the film, the princess burst into tears, "and the two parties, soon realising that they had gone too far, patched up an uneasy truce." According to Charles Greville's memoirs: "The Queen [Adelaide] looked in deep distress, the Princess [Victoria] burst into tears, and the whole company were aghast. The Duchess of Kent said not a word. Immediately after they rose and retired, and a terrible scene ensued; the Duchess announced her immediate departure and ordered her carriage, but a sort of reconciliation was patched up, and she was prevailed upon to stay till the next day."

William Lamb, 2nd Viscount Melbourne, who was prime minister when Victoria came to the throne and a political mentor to the young queen, was forty years her senior, but is portrayed as a much younger man in the film. As for King Leopold, he was her favourite uncle whose advice she constantly sought; her interest in Albert was due not to the latter's success in wooing her, but simply to please Leopold.

Victoria's great-great-granddaughter Queen Elizabeth II viewed the film in a special screening; according to one source, she believed the film had a "lot of good points," but was unhappy with the change to the assassination attempt, and also thought the British officers' costumes looked too German. Apart from the assassination attempt, historian Alex von Tunzelmann noted that "historically, [the film's] not at all bad," and especially praised the depiction of contemporary politics and the characteristics Friend put into his performance as Prince Albert.

=== Casting ===
"I was blown away by how remarkable she was and she seemed like a very modern character, a very 21st century sort of woman. It appealed that it was an opportunity to play someone who is a contradiction to people's preconception of what she was like. Everyone knows her as the mourning Queen who was wheeled around in black with a hanky on her head and was kind of repressed, but she was just the polar opposite when she was younger. That was exciting to me, that I could change people's opinion of what Victoria was like."

— Emily Blunt on her character Queen Victoria

For the title role, King required the candidate be British, and considered casting an unknown actress. British actress Emily Blunt read the script, and aware other actresses would fight for the part, she approached King early in the search process. Blunt later admitted she had a "non-existent knowledge" of the queen, but after consulting her mother about Victoria's successful marriage, Blunt told King that the queen "was a young girl who was very in love for the first time, and she was in a job where she felt way over her head. So I said to Graham, 'She's rebellious. She's a survivor.' I didn't want to approach her as the English rose, but as a young girl who was fighting." They awarded Blunt the role after viewing her entire filmography as well as her Golden Globes acceptance speech for Gideon's Daughter. Blunt noted, "I thought [Victoria] was remarkable and such a challenge. This young girl, who was so feisty and emotional and strong-willed, was very fascinating to me... In my life and in the job I've chosen to do, you have to perform all the time. And I thought Victoria was a bit of an actress." After winning the part, Blunt was allowed access to Windsor Castle, where she viewed Victoria's paintings, letters, diaries, and music composed by Albert himself.

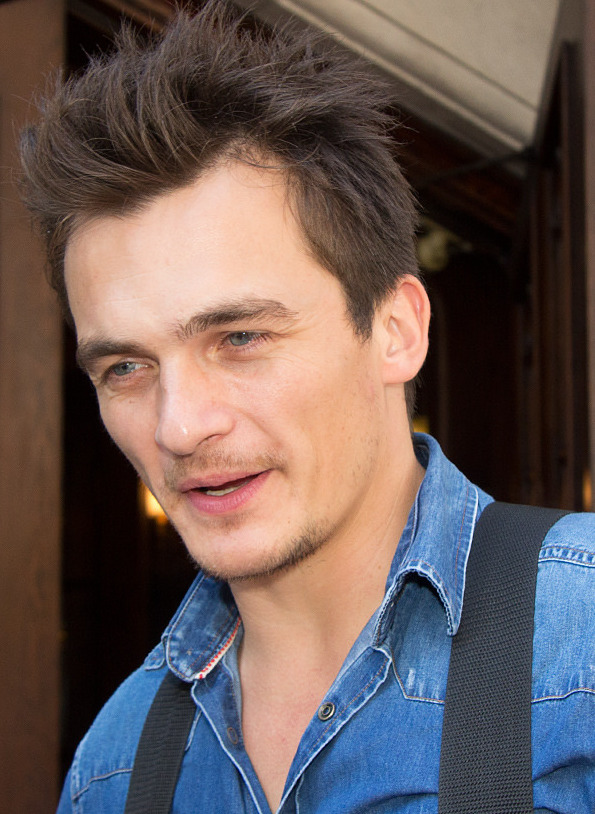
Known at the time for his role in Pride & Prejudice, Rupert Friend was cast as Victoria's husband Prince Albert.

Determined not to use any big Hollywood names, King looked at many European actors before settling on British actor Rupert Friend. They were aware of him from the 2005 film Pride & Prejudice. Vallée noted, "I had an image of Albert in my mind, before we cast Rupert, and how the actor might play him and when Rupert came on board he was just right. He had a very good understanding of the character and he did a lot of research to get him right, with the accent and his deportment. He really looks the part, he looks so romantic!" Co-producer Dennis O'Sullivan called Friend "our Scarlett O'Hara search." They believed the actor had the most chemistry with Blunt after selecting several to play chess with her. Friend's height (6 ft 1in) also played a factor in their choice. Friend believed "Albert was a true unsung hero. A great reformer, a doting husband and father, a hard worker and man of real integrity and modesty." The actor also thought their relationship was not "a gooey love story;" rather, their arguments showed it "wasn't an easy road by any means." Friend strove to immerse himself in the role, and learned the prince's particular characteristics, such as the way he rode a horse, walked, and played the piano. He worked with a voice coach and German instructor to perfect his accent, with the intention of "put[ting] in as much German as possible, because Victoria and Albert did speak German to each other."

Paul Bettany was cast as Lord Melbourne despite being roughly twenty years too young for the part. Vallée explained, "We couldn't find a 58-year-old actor who was sexy and good-looking enough. Paul was a more than good enough actor to age from the inside, and he plays him as a great politician and a great seducer." Early in the casting process the crew wanted to cast Miranda Richardson as the Duchess of Kent, and believed she had such great chemistry with Blunt that it became "genuinely uncomfortable watching them in a scene, as the scenes are so intense and real." Jim Broadbent and Mark Strong joined the cast as King William IV and Sir John Conroy, respectively, as did Harriet Walter as Queen Adelaide. Sarah's elder daughter, Princess Beatrice of York, made her film debut in a small cameo role, becoming the first member of the Royal Family to appear in a non-documentary film.

=== Filming ===
"It adds so much to the film to shoot at these beautiful locations. You look at these places and think how can you not shoot here. Not only does the film look ravishing, but it's important for everyone especially the cast and director to feel that authenticity and see that translate onto the screen."

— Graham King on filming in England

In consideration of the expense of a film shot in Britain, King initially sought to film in Germany and Eastern Europe. However, he came to the realisation that it was vital The Young Victoria be filmed in its native country for authenticity. Due to the Duchess of York's status and connections with the British royal family, The Young Victoria was able to film in many actual palaces and other landmarks. The film had a ten-week shoot starting in August 2007. Scenes set at Westminster Abbey were filmed at Lincoln Cathedral in September and October, and Ham House was substituted for Kensington Palace. Blenheim Palace, Lancaster House and Ditchley Park doubled for internal scenes of the monarch's main residence, Buckingham Palace. Other scenes filmed at Hampton Court Palace, Arundel Castle in West Sussex, Wilton House near Salisbury, Balls Park and Belvoir Castle in Leicestershire. Week four of shooting was especially intensive, as filming was done at a different site each day, including Osterley Park, Old Royal Naval College, Ham House, Novello Theatre and Hampton Court.

== Music ==
Ilan Eshkeri composed the film score. EMI Music released the film soundtrack on 10 March 2009, which contains Eshkeri's score derived from classical compositions and Sinéad O'Connor's original song "Only You".

== Release ==
Momentum Pictures handled distribution of The Young Victoria in the United Kingdom. The film's world premiere was held on 5 February 2009 at the 59th Berlin International Film Festival while its UK premiere was held in London's Leicester Square on 3 March, though the film was shown in the small market town of Bridport, Dorset two days before this on 1 March 2009 in the Electric Palace Theatre, of which Julian Fellowes is a patron. The film was released in British cinemas on 6 March 2009. On its opening week in the UK The Young Victoria grossed £1,016,053, and earned a total of £4,538,697 over its six-week run.

A race over US rights to Victoria film heated up over its US release, and American distribution studio Apparition on the behalf of Sony Pictures Worldwide Acquisitions Group won the rights to the film. At the time, Apparition executive Bob Berney noted the film is "very audience friendly and commercial." The Young Victoria earned US$160,069 on its initial US release on 18 December 2009, where it opened in twenty theatres. It expanded nationwide on Christmas Day, and grossed US$11,001,272 by the end of its theatrical run.

== Reception ==
=== Critical response ===
On the online review aggregator Rotten Tomatoes, the film holds an approval score of 75% based on 155 reviews, with an average rating of 6.5/10. The website's consensus reads, "Emily Blunt shines as Victoria in this romantic but plodding royal portrait." On Metacritic the film has a weighted average score of 64 out of 100, based on reviews from 29 critics, indicating "generally favorable reviews".

Entertainment Weekly film critic Owen Gleiberman gave The Young Victoria a B+; he gave praise to Emily Blunt's performance and concluded, "The Young Victoria has a subtler flow than you might expect, and at times it's calmer than you may like. Director Jean-Marc Vallée's images have a creamy stateliness, but this is no gilded princess fantasy – it's the story of a budding ruler who learns to control her surroundings, and Blunt makes that journey at once authentic and relevant." Manohla Dargis of The New York Times called it a "frivolously entertaining film" and believed it was "directed with some snap by Jean-Marc Vallée." Dargis finished her review, "Despite the filmmakers' efforts to persuade us that The Young Victoria is a serious work, and despite some tense moments and gunfire, the film's pleasures are as light as its story. No matter. Albert may never rip Victoria's bodice, but he does eventually loosen it, to her delight and ours."

The Daily Telegraph called The Young Victoria a "production of the highest calibre with an impeccable cast." The Times' Wendy Ide gave the film 3 out 5 stars wrote "It's decorative, but suffers from a stultifying lack of drama" and found similarities to the 1998 film Elizabeth. Ide found Victoria and Albert's relationship to be "persuasive and rather charming," and praised the performances of both the main and supporting cast, particularly noting Bettany's scene-stealing performance.

Less positive was Peter Bradshaw, film critic for The Guardian, who gave the film two out of five stars. While initially looking forward to Blunt's performance, he believed the "black-belt minx" actress was "never really allowed to let rip. All that coiled feline sensuality stay[ed] coiled." He thought the queen's relationship with Prince Albert "very, very unsexy," as their devotion "makes for a boring film." Bradshaw did praise the power dynamics around Victoria, but concluded "I spent an hour and three-quarters waiting for this film to start. Where was the tang and the zing and the oomph of Fellowes's cracking script for Robert Altman's Gosford Park?"

=== Awards ===
Emily Blunt received various nominations for her role. At the 63rd British Academy Film Awards, The Young Victoria won the BAFTA Award for Best Costume Design and the BAFTA Award for Best Makeup and Hair. The film also received the 2010 Academy Award for Costume Design.

== Home media ==
Sony Pictures Home Entertainment released the DVD and Blu-ray on 13 July 2009 for the UK, and 20 April 2010 for the US. The DVD special features included deleted and extended scenes, and four featurettes on filming and the subject matter's history. The Blu-ray possesses a feature that allows viewers to access real-time data about the actors, music, film trivia and other information.

== See also ==
- Victoria (similarly themed ITV drama shown from 2016 to 2019 starring Jenna Coleman produced by Mammoth Screen)
