= Victoire Conroy =

British aristocrat, childhood companion to queen Victoria

Victoire Hamner
- Born: Victoria Maria Louisa Conroy; 12 August 1819; Plumstead, Kent, England
- Died: 9 February 1866 (aged 46); Leighton Buzzard, Bedfordshire, England
- Known for: Childhood companion to Queen Victoria
- Spouse: Sir Wyndham Hanmer, 4th Baronet (m. 1842)
- Children: Sir Edward Hanmer, 5th Baronet
- Parent(s): Sir John Conroy; Elizabeth Fisher

Victoire Maria Louisa Hanmer (née Conroy; 12 August 1819 – 9 February 1866) was a childhood companion of the future Queen Victoria. She was born the youngest daughter of Sir John Conroy, who served as the comptroller of the household of the Duchess of Kent and the young princess.

== Life ==
Victoire and her siblings were among the few companions the young princess Victoria was allowed. The princess grew up in the controlling Kensington System, managed by John Conroy and the Duchess of Kent. Victoire saw Victoria most often. The Conroy children came to Kensington Palace, or Victoria was taken to visit the siblings at their home.

Victoire was a few months younger than Victoria, with dark, hazel eyes, and small regular features. Victoria disliked her, suspecting that Victoire reported their activities to John Conroy. Victoria soon began referring to Victoire as "Miss. V. Conroy" in her journals, a sign of displeasure. Victoria was aware that Conroy intended her to reward Victoire and her sister Jane with positions once she became queen. The princess also felt insulted that Conroy often boasted that his daughters "were as high as her".

Victoire appears in the princess' journals and watercolours as a person "frequently noted but never analyzed," in contrast with Victoria's writings of her governess Louise Lehzen, for instance. Carolly Erickson conjectures that had Victoire been "warm and friendly" to the princess, the "lonely" Victoria would have liked rather than disliked and distrusted her. Erickson does acknowledge however that Victoire was placed in an awkward position: while she was the daughter of Victoria's hated enemy, Victoire was still forced into contact with the princess.

Little otherwise is known of Victoire. Some time after her coronation in 1837, the new queen allowed financial support to be given to Conroy's widow and children. Victoire married Sir Wyndham Edward Hanmer, 4th Baronet on 10 March 1842. They had one son, Sir Edward John Henry Hanmer, 5th Bt. (15 April 1843 – 3 May 1893).
