= Conroy baronets =

Extinct baronetcy in the Baronetage of the United Kingdom

Escutcheon of the Conroy baronets

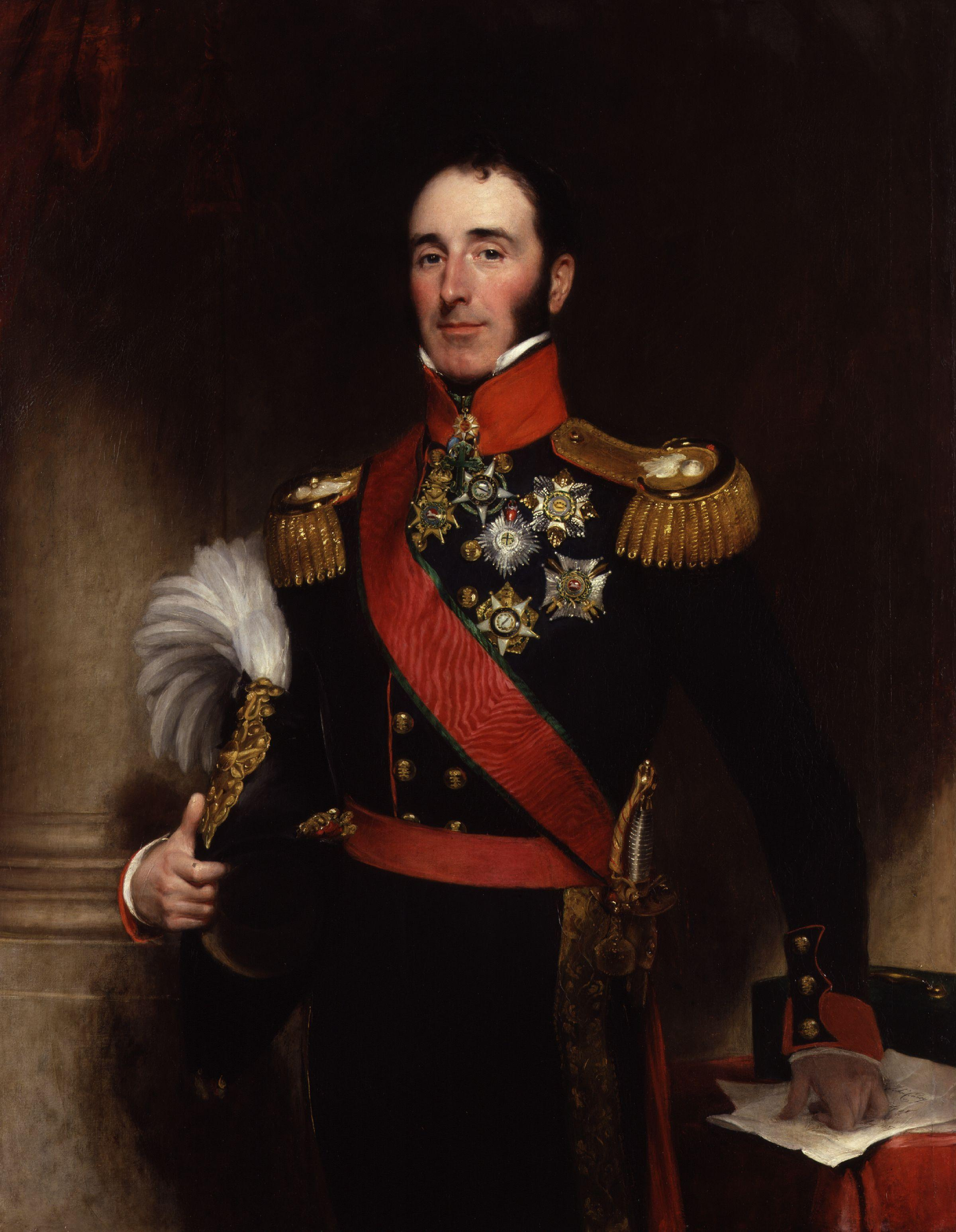
Portrait of John Conroy by Henry William Pickersgill (1837).

The Conroy Baronetcy, of Llanbrynmair in the historic County of Montgomery, Wales, was a title in the Baronetage of the United Kingdom.

The title was created on 7 July 1837 for Sir John Conroy, Comptroller of the household of the Duchess of Kent, mother of Queen Victoria. Victoria had previously dismissed Conroy from her household and the baronetcy was conferred on him with the understanding that he would not show himself at court in return. The title became extinct on the death of the third Baronet in 1900.

== Conroy baronets (1837) ==
- Sir John Conroy, 1st Baronet (1786–1854)
- Sir Edward Conroy, 2nd Baronet (1809–1869)
- Sir John Conroy, 3rd Baronet (1845–1900)

== Patrilineal descent ==
The Conroys descended from the Ó Maolconaire family of Elphin, Co.Roscommon. The family had been the hereditary Ollamhs to the O'Connor Kings of Connacht. Their line was descended from Maoilin Ó Maolchonaire who was the last recognised Chief of the Sept.

1. Torna Mór Ó Maolchonaire, Chief of the Sept, d. 1435
2. Seán Rua Ó Maolchonaire
3. Domhnall Rua Ó Maolchonaire, d. 1504
4. Conchobhar Ó Maolchonaire, Chief of the Sept, d. 1533
5. Maolmhuire Ó Maolchonaire, Chief of the Sept
6. Maoilin Ó Maolchonaire, Last Chief of the Sept, d. 1637
7. Torna Ó Maolchonaire
8. Seán Ó Maolchonaire, d. 1672 (while fighting for the French during the Franco-Dutch War)
9. Ferfeasa Conry, d. 1746 (first of this line to convert from Catholicism to Protestantism)
10. John Conry of Elphin, d. 1769
11. John Conry, d. 1795
12. Sir John Ponsonby Conroy, 1st Baronet (1786–1854)
13. Sir Edward Conroy, 2nd Baronet (1809–1869)
14. Sir John Conroy, 3rd Baronet (1845–1900)

Baronetage of the United Kingdom
Preceded by Houston baronets	Conroy baronets of Llanbrynmair; 7 July 1837	Succeeded by Clark baronets
