= Clark baronets of St George's, Hanover Square (1837) =

Escutcheon of the Clark baronets of St George's, Hanover Square

The Clark baronetcy, of St George's, Hanover Square, London, was created in the Baronetage of the United Kingdom on 11 November 1837 for James Clark, physician in ordinary to the Royal Household. The title became extinct on the death of the 2nd Baronet in 1910.

== Clark baronets, of St George's Hanover Square (1837) ==
- Sir James Clark, 1st Baronet (1788–1870)
- Sir John Forbes Clark, 2nd Baronet (1821–1910)

== Notes ==
Baronetage of the United Kingdom
Preceded by Conroy baronets	Clark baronets of St George's, Hanover Square; 11 November 1837	Succeeded by Wood baronets
