= Lady Flora Hastings =

British aristocrat and lady-in-waiting (1806–1839)

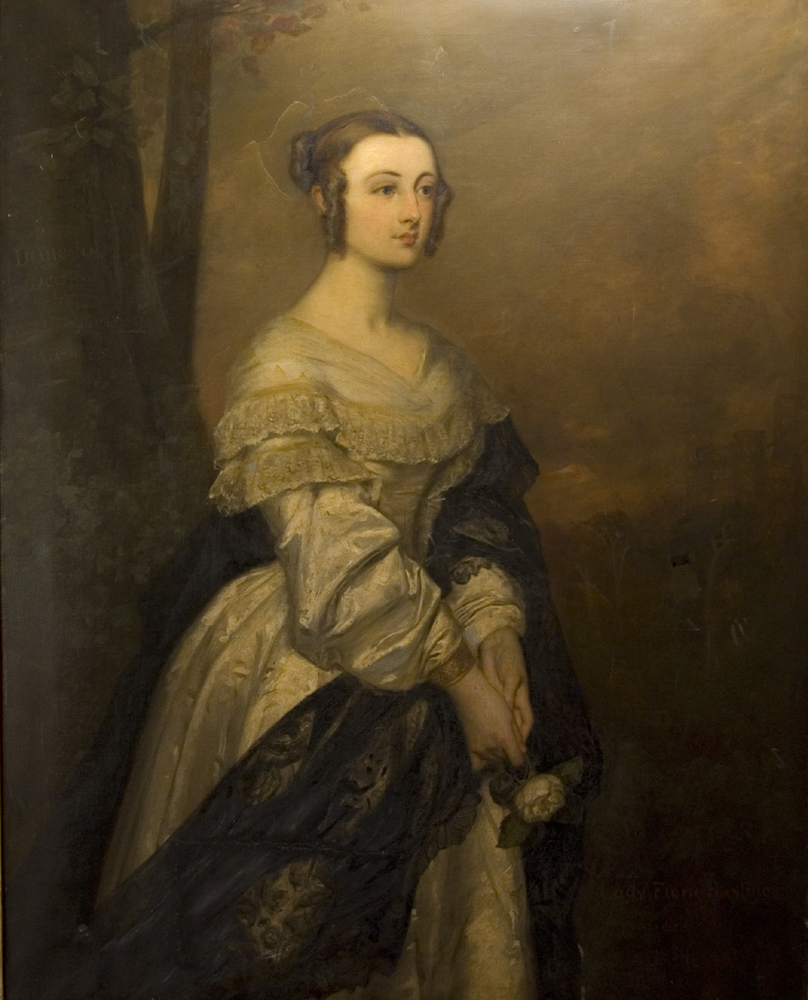
- Born: 11 February 1806
- Died: 5 July 1839 (aged 33); London, England
- Cause of death: Liver tumour
- Resting place: Loudoun Kirk, near Loudoun Castle, Scotland
- Political party: Tory
- Parent(s): Francis Rawdon-Hastings, 1st Marquess of Hastings; Flora Mure-Campbell, 6th Countess of Loudoun

Lady Flora Elizabeth Rawdon-Hastings (11 February 1806 – 5 July 1839) was a British aristocrat and lady-in-waiting to Queen Victoria's mother, the Duchess of Kent. Her death in 1839 was the subject of a court scandal that gave the Queen a negative image.

== Family ==
Lady Flora was one of the daughters of Francis Rawdon-Hastings, 1st Marquess of Hastings (1754–1826) and his wife Flora Mure-Campbell (1780–1840). Her siblings were George, Sophia, Selina, and Adelaide. She was brought up at Loudon Castle near Galston, East Ayrshire in Ayrshire.

== Scandal ==
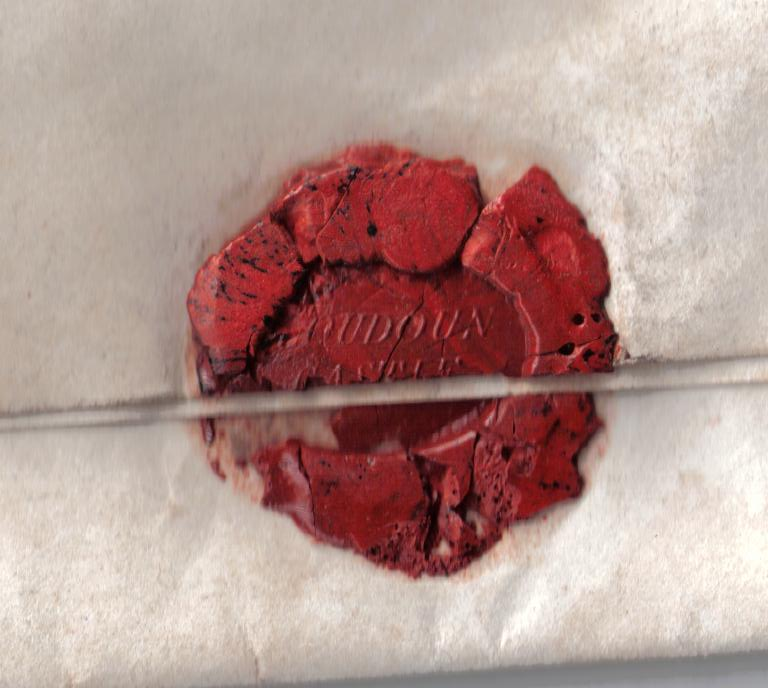
Wax seal on a letter written by Hastings

The unmarried Lady Flora was alleged to have had an affair with John Conroy, comptroller, "favourite" and also suspected lover of Queen Victoria's mother, the Duchess of Kent.

=== Background ===
The Duchess's daughter, Alexandrina Victoria (later Queen Victoria), detested Conroy, while Flora disliked the queen's adored friend and mentor, Baroness Lehzen, as well as the Prime Minister, Lord Melbourne.

As the Duchess of Kent's lady-in-waiting, Lady Flora was party to Conroy's Kensington System: by which he colluded with the Duchess to keep Victoria isolated from her Hanoverian uncles. For these reasons, the young Victoria hated and suspected Lady Flora, and was open to any accusation that might reflect negatively on Conroy or his aides. Once she ascended the throne in June 1837, Victoria made every attempt to keep her mother's household, including Lady Flora and Conroy, away from her in distant parts of Buckingham Palace. Her mother unsuccessfully insisted that Conroy and his family be allowed at court; Victoria disagreed, saying: "I thought you would not expect me to invite Sir John Conroy after his conduct towards me for some years past."

=== 1839 ===
Sometime in 1839, Lady Flora began to experience pain and swelling in her lower abdomen. She visited the queen's physician, Sir James Clark, who could not diagnose her condition without an examination, which she refused. Clark assumed the abdominal growth was pregnancy, and met with Lady Flora twice a week from 10 January to 16 February. As she was unmarried, his suspicions were hushed up. However, her enemies, Baroness Lehzen and Marchioness of Tavistock (better known as the inventor of afternoon tea) spread the rumour that she was "with child", and eventually Lehzen told Melbourne about her fears. On 2 February, the queen wrote in her journal that she suspected Conroy, a man whom she loathed intensely, to be the father, due to his taking a late-night carriage ride alone with Lady Flora. Lady Flora felt that she had to defend herself in public, publishing her version of events in the form of a letter which appeared in The Examiner, and blaming "a certain foreign lady" (Lehzen) for spreading the rumours.

The accusations were proven false when Lady Flora finally consented to a physical examination by the royal doctors, who confirmed that she was not pregnant. She did, however, have an advanced cancerous liver tumour. With only two months to live, Lady Flora wrote in 1839 to her mother on the subject of the upcoming Eglinton Tournament, expressing her concern that one of the knights might be killed in the violent sport. Queen Victoria visited the now emaciated and clearly dying Lady Flora on 27 June.

=== Death ===
Lady Flora died in London on 5 July 1839, aged 33. She was buried at Loudoun Castle, her family home. Conroy and Lord Hastings, her brother, stirred up a press campaign against both the Queen and Doctor Clark which attacked them for insulting and disgracing Lady Flora with false rumours and for plotting against her and the entire Hastings family.

Published in The Morning Post, their campaign also condemned the queen's "fellow conspirators", Baroness Lehzen and Lady Tavistock, as the guilty parties who had originated the false rumour of pregnancy. These attempts fell far short of their goals of discrediting the queen and forcing her to appoint Conroy to some post close to her person. Victoria remained adamant that Conroy should never be close to the throne in any fashion. The next year, her marriage and subsequent pregnancy restored her to popular favour. Victoria remained haunted by guilty memories of Lady Flora, having nightmares about her for years afterwards.

== Poetry ==
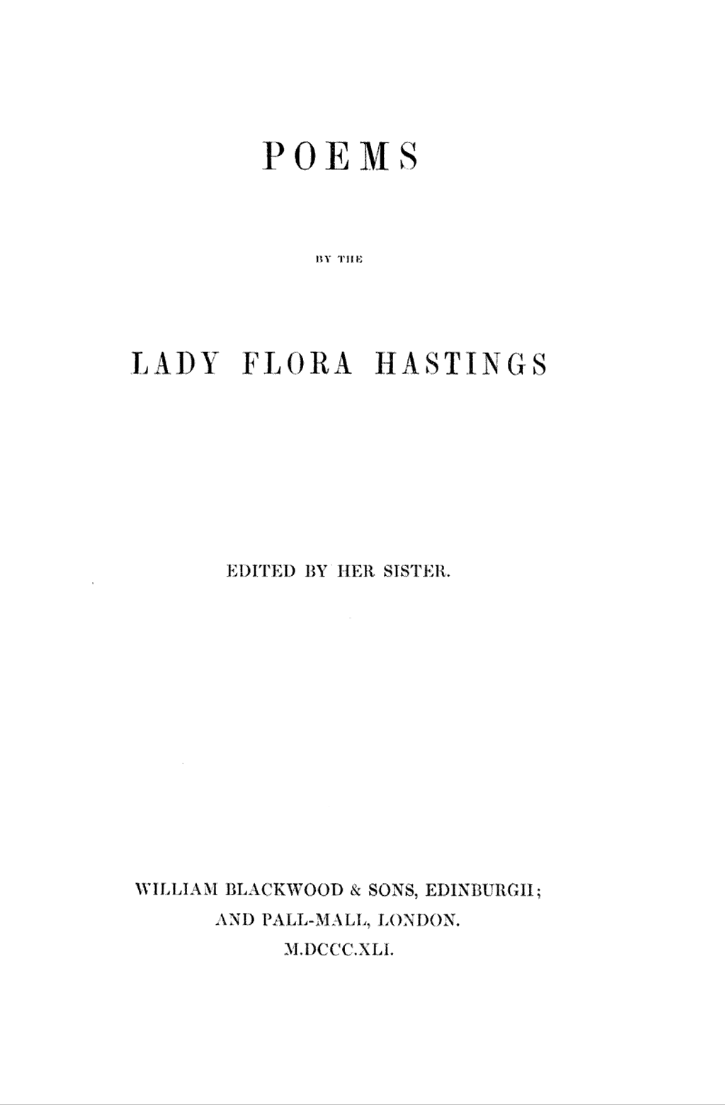
Title page of the book Poems by the Lady Flora Hastings (1841)

Hastings was also a poet; a collection of her work, Poems by the Lady Flora Hastings, was edited by her sister Sophia (later the Marchioness of Bute), and published posthumously. The publication received an enthusiastic review in The Literary Gazette, which commented:

Lady Flora Hastings writes not like a person of quality. She has set aside all conventional forms and terms, "to look on nature with a poet's eye." With a fine eye and ear for the external world, her compositions evince an intellect cultivated by the study of the best models; and, had she been spared to literature, and made to feel, by public approbation, a greater confidence in the powers which she assuredly possessed, it is not difficult to say to what degree of excellence it was within her reach to attain. [...] The last verses of Lady Flora Hastings were written in May 1839, shortly before her melancholy departure from among us. There is a dirgelike tone, even in their versification, which is sufficiently striking:—

"Break not by heedless word the spell
With which that strain hath bound me;
For the bright thoughts of former years
Are thronging fast around me.

Voices long hush'd are heard again,
Smiles that have pass'd away
Beam on my memory, as once
They bless'd mine early day.

Hopes that have melted into air,
And sorrows that have slept—
And bending from the spirits' land,
The loved—the lost—the wept.

My very heart is young again,
As in the days of yore;
I feel that I could trust—alas!
As I may trust no more!"

— The Literary Gazette (1840)

A second edition of the poems was published in 1842.

== Bibliography ==
- The Victim of Scandal. Memoir of the Late Lady Flora Hastings with the statement of the Marquis of Hastings, entire correspondence and a Portrait of her Ladyship (1839). Glasgow: Duncan Campbell.
- The Story of Lady Flora Hastings, reprinted from Ayrshire Notes and Queries in the Kilmarnock Standard (1884; 3rd edition, with appendix), Kilmarnock: James McKie Publishers.
