= Arborfield Hall =

Former country house in Southern England

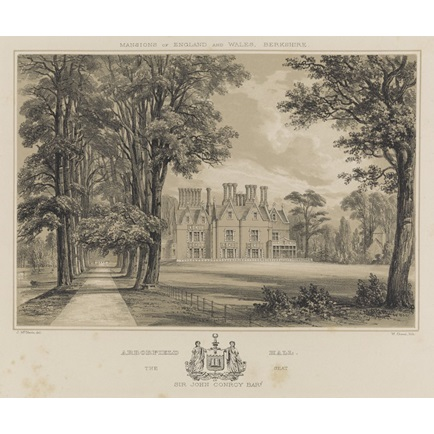
- Arborfield Hall c. 1850

- Location within Berkshire
- 51.406°N 0.926°W
- Location: Arborfield

History
- Built: 13th century
- Built for: Bullock family
- Demolished: 1832, 1837
- Rebuilt: 1603, 1955

Arborfield Hall was a large country house on the banks of the River Loddon near the village of Arborfield in Berkshire.

== History ==
The site originally contained a manor house, which was occupied by the Bullock family from the early 13th century. This was acquired by Edmund Standen in 1589 and passed to his son, William Standen, who rebuilt the house in the Jacobean style in 1603; a stable block was added in 1654. The manor house was sold to Pelsant Reeves, a Master in Chancery, in 1730 and it remained in the Reeves family until a descendant, George Dawson, demolished it in 1832.

George Dawson commissioned a new hall in 1837 but sold it to Sir John Conroy, Controller of the Household of the Duchess of Kent, in 1842. The new hall was bought by Thomas Hargreaves, a businessman who became High Sheriff of Berkshire, in 1855 and it remained in the Hargreaves family until 1926. The hall was then bought at auction by the Allsebrook family.

During the Second World War, the hall was requisitioned by the Royal Air Force. It was then acquired by the University of Reading and demolished in 1955.
