= Victoria & Albert (TV serial) =

- Genre: Period drama
- Directed by: John Erman
- Starring: Victoria Hamilton; Jonathan Firth; Peter Ustinov; Jonathan Pryce
- Composer: Alan Parker
- Countries of origin: United Kingdom; United States
- Original language: English
- No. of series: 1
- No. of episodes: 2

Production
- Executive producers: Sue Deeks; Delia Fine; Doug Schwalbe
- Producer: David Cunliffe
- Running time: 200 minutes
- Production companies: Own2feet Productions; Splendid Television for BBC

Original release
- Network: BBC One (UK); A&E (U.S.)
- Release: 26 August – 27 August 2001

Victoria & Albert was a 2001 British-American historical television serial. It focused on the early life and marriage of Queen Victoria and Prince Albert. The series starred Victoria Hamilton as Victoria, Jonathan Firth as Prince Albert, and Peter Ustinov as King William IV. It was directed by John Erman.

In the UK it was broadcast by the BBC, split into two parts of 100 minutes each. The series is now available on DVD.

== Plot ==
The first episode covers Victoria's growth from bullied princess to reigning queen, and includes her romance and marriage with Albert of Saxe-Coburg-Gotha. The second episode depicts Victoria's life from her first pregnancy to Albert's death, including their family life together and Albert's increasing public role. Each episode is begun and ended by a small section with the 'Old Victoria', at the age of about 78.

== Cast ==
- Victoria Hamilton as Queen Victoria
- Jonathan Firth as Prince Albert
- Peter Ustinov as King William IV
- Delena Kidd as Queen Adelaide
- Penelope Wilton as The Duchess of Kent
- Nigel Hawthorne as Lord Melbourne
- Diana Rigg as Baroness Lehzen
- John Wood as The Duke of Wellington
- David Suchet as Baron Stockmar
- Jonathan Cecil as Page
- Patrick Malahide as Sir John Conroy
- James Callis as Prince Ernest of Saxe-Coburg and Gotha
- Jonathan Pryce as King Leopold I of Belgium
- Crispin Redman as Mr Anson
- Alec McCowen as Sir Robert Peel
- Michael Siberry as Henry Paget, Earl of Uxbridge
- Rachel Pickup as Henrietta (Hetty) Standish
- Crispin Bonham-Carter as Frederick Standish
- Simon Quarterman as Albert Edward, the Prince of Wales
- Richard Briers as Joseph Paxton
- Kate Maberly as Princess Alice
- Joyce Redman as aged Queen Victoria
- Zizi Strallen as Victoria, Princess Royal
- Billy Hicks as Prince Affie
