= Augustus George Vernon Harcourt =

English chemist (1834–1919)

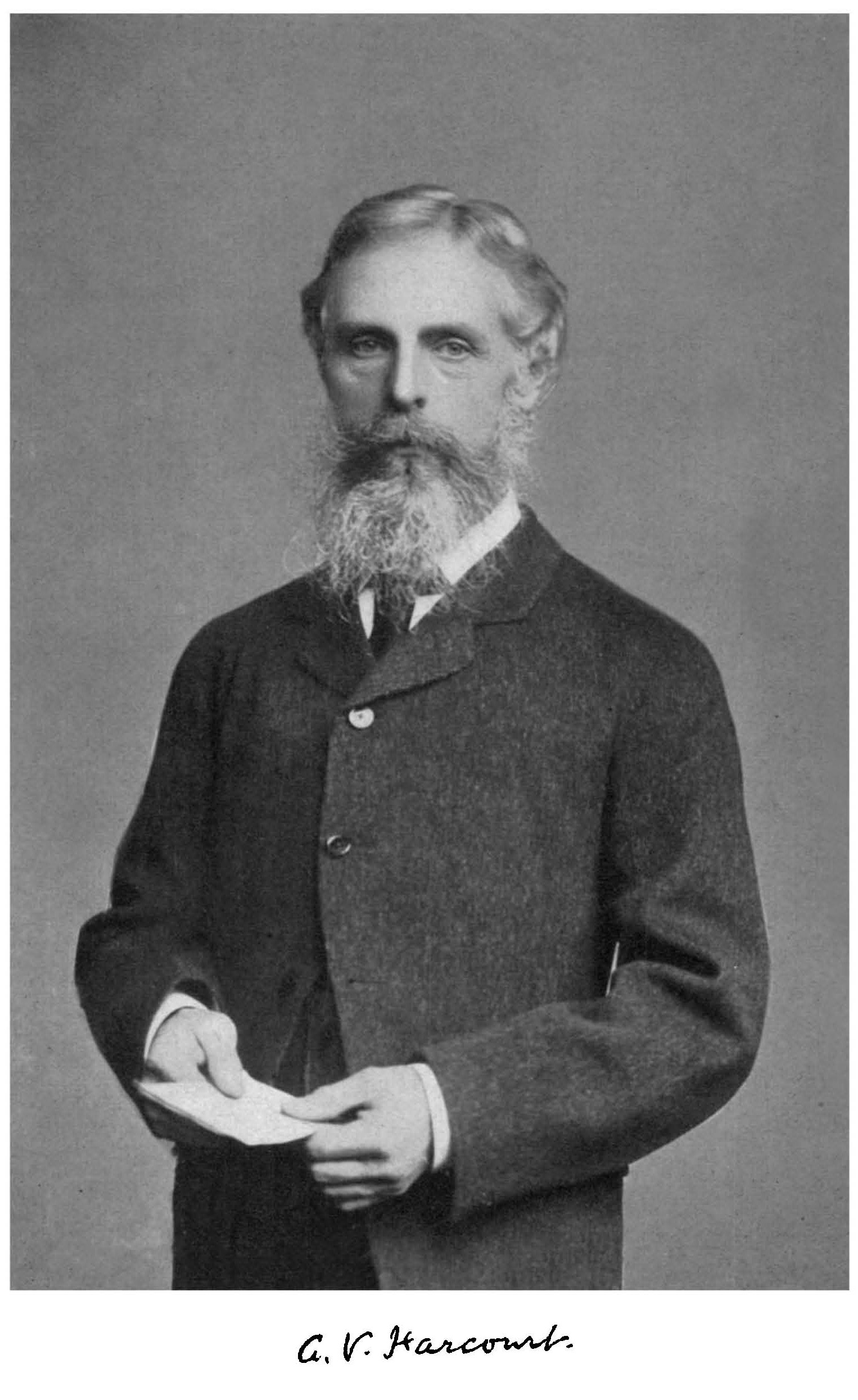
- A. G. Vernon Harcourt
- Born: 24 December 1834; London, England
- Died: 23 August 1919 (aged 84); St Clare, Isle of Wight, England
- Education: Balliol College, Oxford
- Known for: Chemical kinetics, iodine clock reaction
- Scientific career
- Fields: Physical chemistry
- Workplaces: Christ Church, Oxford
- Doctoral advisor: Sir Benjamin Collins Brodie, 2nd Baronet
- Doctoral students: Sir John Conroy

Augustus George Vernon Harcourt FRS (24 December 1834 – 23 August 1919) was an English chemist who spent his career at Oxford University. He was one of the first scientists to do quantitative work in the field of chemical kinetics. His uncle, William Vernon Harcourt (1789–1871), founded the British Association for the Advancement of Science.

== Biography ==
Harcourt was born in London in 1834 to Admiral Frederick Edward Vernon Harcourt and his wife, Marcia. Harcourt's mother was a sister of the first Lord Tollemache. Augustus Harcourt was educated at Harrow School before enrolling at Balliol College, Oxford, where he took a degree in Natural Science in 1858, working with Henry Smith and Benjamin Brodie. A year later Harcourt became Lee's Reader in chemistry and took a position as a senior student at Christ Church, Oxford, where he was a contemporary of Charles Dodgson, better known as Lewis Carroll, and is mentioned in Carroll's diaries. Working with the mathematician William Esson (1838–1916), Harcourt began a series of chemical investigations which lasted for over 40 years.

In 1872, Harcourt married Rachel Mary Bruce, daughter of the Home Secretary, Henry Bruce. The couple had two sons and eight daughters.

In 1879, Harcourt sat on the committee which was formed to create an Oxford women's college "in which no distinction will be made between students on the ground of their belonging to different religious denominations." This resulted in the founding of Somerville Hall (later Somerville College). His wife became the inaugural joint secretary of the Somerville Council together with the novelist Mary Augusta Ward, both of whom are remembered by name each year in the college's Commemoration Service.

Harcourt remained at Oxford until he retired in 1902, whereupon he moved to St Clare, near Ryde on the Isle of Wight. He died there in 1919, and his wife followed in 1927.

== Chemical kinetics ==
In a long partnership, Harcourt and William Esson studied the rates of chemical reactions. Among the processes they investigated was the acid-catalyzed iodine clock reaction (iodide and hydrogen peroxide). Their work showed that the reaction's changing rate was proportional to the concentration of reactants present. This result was later formalised by Guldberg and Waage as the law of mass action. Harcourt and Esson also studied the reaction between oxalic acid and potassium permanganate.

== Other scientific work ==
Harcourt's other activities included inventing a device to safely administer chloroform as an anesthetic, and the analysis and purification of coal gas, used for illumination. Harcourt also invented pentane-burning lamps that served as photometric standards.

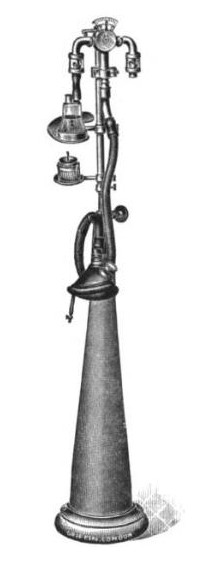
Harcourt chloroform regulator

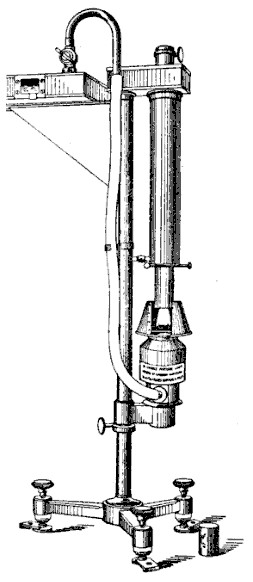
Harcourt pentane-air lamp

== Honours and activities ==
- 1863: Fellow of the Royal Society
- 1865–1873: Secretary of the Chemical Society
- 1895: President of the Chemical Society
