= John Conroy =

British military officer (1786–1854)

Sir John Conroy Bt KCH
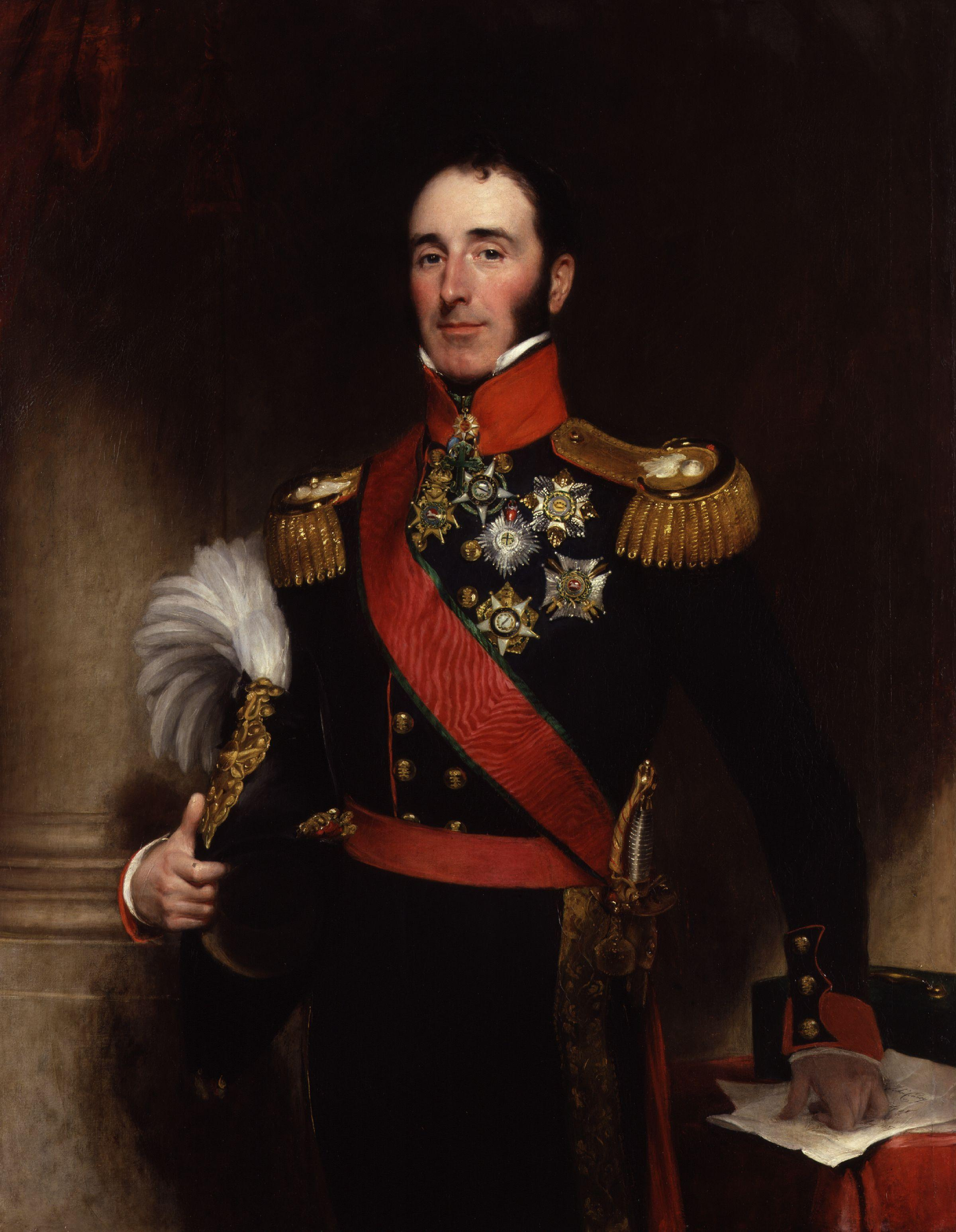
- Portrait of John Conroy by Henry William Pickersgill, 1837
- Born: 21 October 1786; Caerhun, Caernarfonshire, Wales
- Died: 2 March 1854 (aged 67); Arborfield Hall, Berkshire, England
- Known for: Chief attendant of Prince Edward, Duke of Kent and Strathearn; comptroller to the early household of Queen Victoria
- Spouse: Elizabeth Fisher (m. 1808)
- Children: 6, including Victoire
- Military career
- Allegiance: United Kingdom
- Branch: British Army; British Militia
- Service years: 1805–1854
- Rank: Second captain (British Army); Lieutenant colonel commandant (Militia)
- Units: Royal Artillery; Royal Montgomeryshire Militia
- Conflicts: Napoleonic Wars

Sir John Ponsonby Conroy, 1st Baronet, KCH (21 October 1786 – 2 March 1854) was a British military officer best known for serving as comptroller to the Duchess of Kent and her young daughter, the future Queen Victoria. Born in Wales to Irish parents, he was educated in Dublin before being commissioned into the British Army's Royal Artillery in 1803, but did not take part in active service during the Napoleonic Wars.

In 1817, he became the equerry of Prince Edward, Duke of Kent and Strathearn. The Duke died two years later, leaving a widow and infant daughter. Holding the position of comptroller of the Duchess of Kent's household for the next nineteen years, Conroy also acted as her confidant and political agent, among other roles. Together, they designed the Kensington System, an elaborate and strict system of rules for Victoria's upbringing designed to render her weak-willed and utterly dependent upon them in the hope of allowing them one day to wield power through her.

Victoria grew to hate Conroy, due to the oppressive system he co-designed and enforced on her, and he was also unpopular among the rest of the British royal family. His efforts to place the Duchess in the role of regent were ultimately unsuccessful, as Victoria ascended the throne after reaching her majority in 1837. Conroy was immediately expelled from Victoria's household, though he remained in the Duchess of Kent's service for several more years. Given a pension and a baronetcy, Conroy retired to his estate near Reading, Berkshire, in 1842 and died heavily in debt twelve years later.

Historians have often referred to Conroy as someone with strong ambition, giving disparate assessments of his personal character and actions. Rumours circulated during and after his lifetime that he was possibly the Duchess of Kent's lover. Victoria insisted this was not possible, arguing that her mother's piety would have forbidden it.

== Early life ==
John Conroy was born on 21 October 1786 in Caerhun, Caernarfonshire. He was one of six children born to John Ponsonby Conroy, a barrister from County Roscommon, and his wife Margaret. Both of his parents were born in Ireland. Conroy underwent a private education in Dublin before being commissioned into the British Army as a second lieutenant in the Royal Artillery on 8 September 1803; four days later, he was promoted to first lieutenant. In 1805, Conroy enrolled in the Royal Military Academy, Woolwich. Serving in the British army during the Napoleonic Wars, his efforts to avoid active military service earned Conroy the ire of fellow officers. He did not participate in either the Peninsular War or Waterloo campaign, the two major conflicts the British Army was involved in during the Napoleonic Wars.

On 26 December 1808, Conroy married Elizabeth Fisher, the daughter of Colonel Benjamin Fisher, in Dublin. This helped facilitate his rise through the ranks although not to the extent which Conroy felt he deserved. Conroy served in Ireland and England under Benjamin, mostly performing administrative duties. He was promoted to second captain on 13 March 1811 and appointed as adjutant in the Corps of Royal Artillery Drivers on 11 March 1817. Together, Conroy and Elizabeth had six children: Edward, Elizabeth, Arthur, Stephen, Henry and Victoire. Edward married Lady Alicia Parsons, the daughter of Lawrence Parsons, 2nd Earl of Rosse, with whom he had the chemist John Conroy. Stephen served in the Coldstream Guards, and Henry served in the Grenadier Guards along with serving as the aide-de-camp to Sir Edward Blakeney, the Commander-in-Chief, Ireland. Victoire married Sir Wyndham Edward Hanmer, 4th Baronet, in 1842.

== Employment with the Kents ==
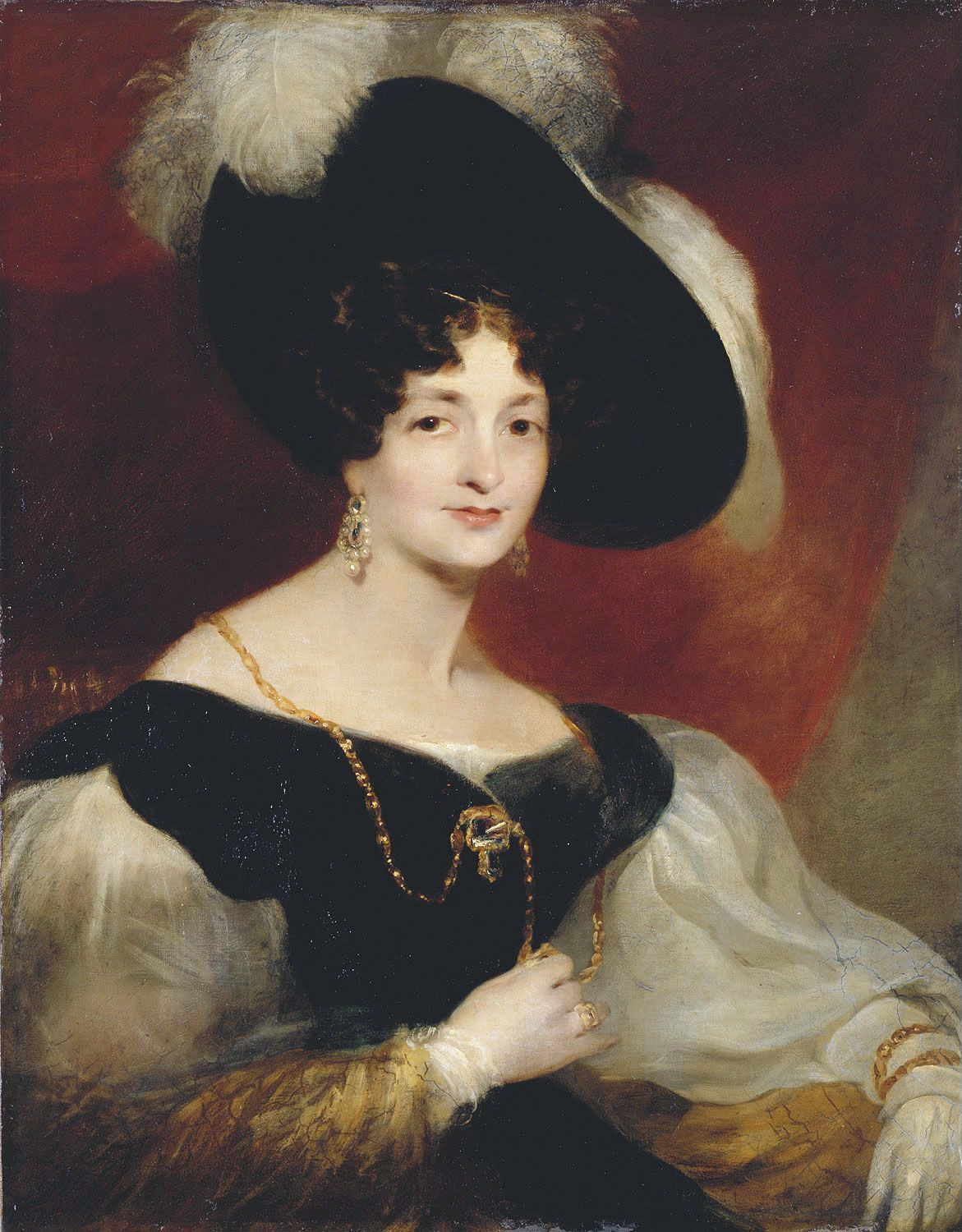
Conroy's relationship with the Duchess of Kent (pictured) was subject to rumours that they were lovers.

Through the connection of his wife's uncle, (Note: Elizabeth's uncle was Dr. John Fisher, the Bishop of Salisbury. Fisher had previously served as a tutor for the Duke of Kent.) Conroy came to the attention of Prince Edward, Duke of Kent and Strathearn, the fourth son of King George III. Conroy was appointed as an equerry in 1817, shortly before the Duke's marriage to Princess Victoria of Saxe-Coburg-Saalfeld. An efficient organiser, Conroy's planning ensured the Duke and Duchess' speedy return to England in time for the birth of their first child. The child was Princess Alexandrina Victoria of Kent, later Queen Victoria.

While the Duke of Kent had promised Conroy military advancement, he was still a captain by the time of the Duke's death in 1820. Conroy was named an executor of the Duke's will, though he was unsuccessful in persuading the dying man to name him Victoria's guardian. Aware that he needed to find another source of revenue quickly, Conroy offered his services as comptroller to the now-widowed Duchess of Kent and her infant daughter. He retired from military service on half-pay in 1822.

=== Kensington system ===
Together in a hostile environment, (Note: A German, the Duchess of Kent was unpopular in England, and did not mix well with the British royal family.) Conroy's relationship with the Duchess was very close, with him serving as her comptroller and private secretary for the next nineteen years, as well as holding the unofficial roles of public relations officer, counsellor, confidant and political agent. While it is not clear which of the two was more responsible for devising the Kensington System, it was created to govern young Victoria's upbringing.

An elaborate and oppressive system of rules regulating every facet of Victoria's life, it kept her in reclusive isolation most of the time, with the goal of making her weak, compliant and utterly dependent upon her mother and Conroy. The intention was for the Duchess to be appointed regent upon Victoria's (assumed youthful) ascension and for Conroy to be created Victoria's private secretary and given a peerage.

Aware of the reasons behind King George IV's unpopularity, (Note: George IV was perceived as corrupt, unfaithful and profligate.) Conroy promoted a public image of the Duchess that was pure, modest and decorous, while at the same time increasing her paranoia against the British royal family, particularly the Duke of Cumberland.

Princess Victoria soon came to hate Conroy who bullied and insulted her, mocking her economical habits. Some historians have conjectured that Conroy's arrogant behaviour towards Victoria may have stemmed from a personal belief that his wife Elizabeth was secretly the illegitimate child of the Duke of Kent. While the rumour was later proven false, Conroy's strong ambition may have stemmed from this self-perceived connection to the aristocracy. Ambition may also have been influenced by Conroy's claim of descent from the ancient kings of Ireland. Regardless of his claims of grandeur, Conroy belonged to the middle class and recognised the growing power of this group within British society.

Conroy effectively barred Victoria from anyone other than the Duchess or his relatives and the princess was prevented from becoming close to her extended family. The enforced isolation meant the only companions of her own age whom she frequently came into contact with were Conroy's daughters, who included Victoire, a girl a few months younger than Victoria. Victoria does not appear to have been fond of either Conroy sister as there is little positive comment in her personal journals.

The young princess depended on her devoted governess Louise Lehzen, who defended her against Conroy's machinations. As Victoria grew older, attempts were made by Conroy and the Duchess to secure Lehzen's removal, or at least the lessening of her influence. Such tactics proved unsuccessful, as the princess became more devoted to Lehzen than before, as evident in her journals.

Early in his stay at Kensington Palace, Conroy made an effort to become close to Princess Sophia, an elderly sister of George IV who also resided at the palace. Sophia is described by Christopher Hibbert as an "impressionable and mentally unstable woman", and Conroy had little difficulty in persuading her to let him take control of her finances. In return for making Sophia a member of the Duchess's social circle, the princess reported back to Conroy on activities at St. James's Palace and Kensington when he was absent.

==== Finances of Princess Sophia ====
Princess Sophia's substantial income, provided from the civil list, had allowed Conroy to enjoy a wealthy lifestyle. The princess died in 1848, leaving only £1,607 19s 7d in her bank accounts despite a lifestyle of savings and low expenses. The Duke of Cambridge and the Duchess of Gloucester had a lawyer write to Conroy demanding that he account for the rest of their sister Sophia's funds, but Conroy simply ignored it. According to Flora Fraser, the most recent biographer of George III's daughters, Princess Sophia had in fact personally spent huge sums on Conroy, including heavy contributions to the purchase prices of his residences and supporting his family in a style he judged appropriate to their position. Conroy ultimately received £148,000 in gifts and money from Sophia.

=== Victoria as heir presumptive ===
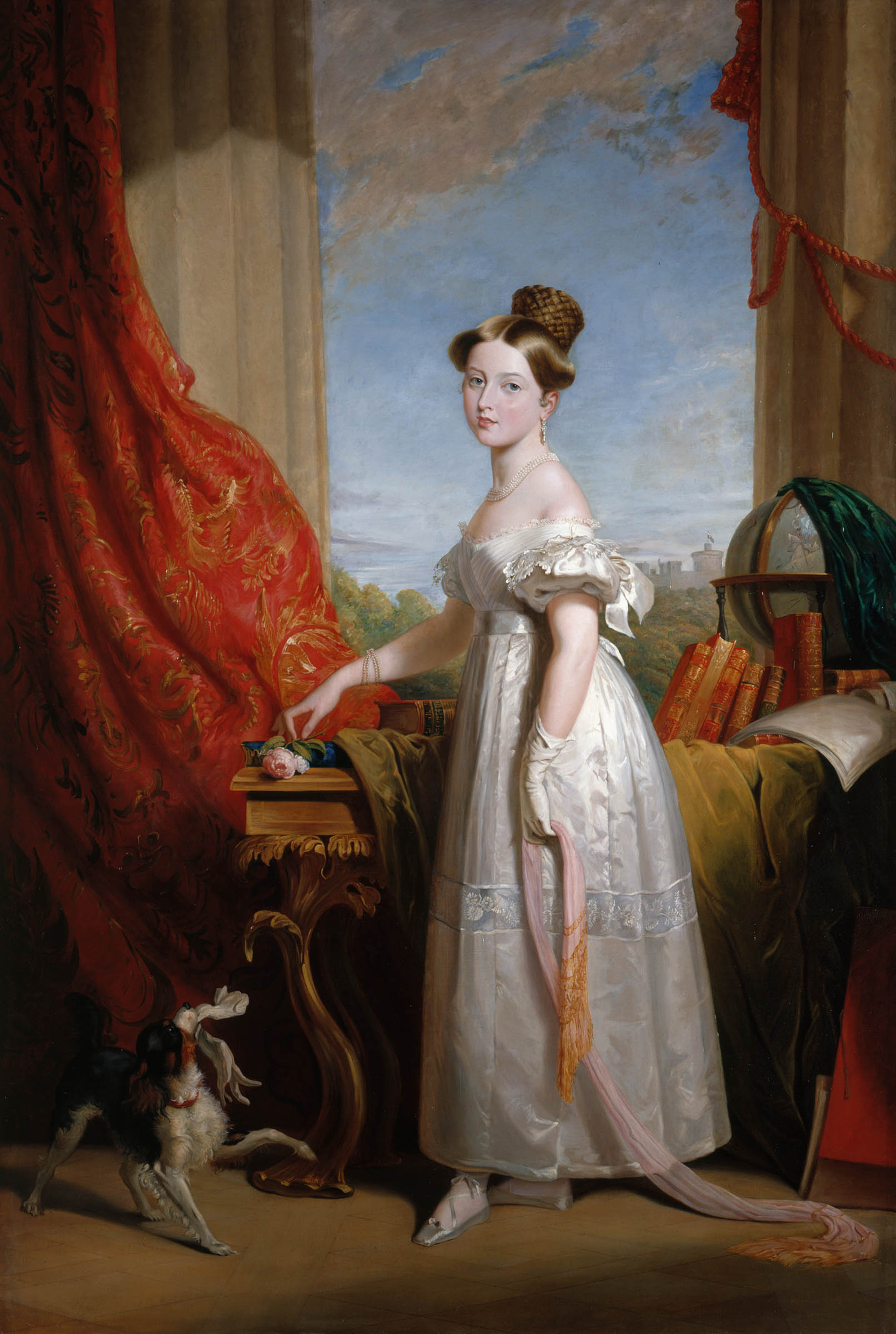
Princess Victoria, 1833. She grew up in the controlling Kensington System devised by her mother and Conroy.

In 1827, the Duke of York died, making the Duke of Clarence heir presumptive and Victoria second-in-line to the throne. Conroy complained that the princess should not be surrounded by commoners, leading George IV to appoint Conroy a Knight Commander of the Hanoverian Order and a Knight Bachelor that year. The Duchess and Conroy continued to be unpopular with the royal family and, in 1829, the Duke of Cumberland spread rumours that they were lovers in an attempt to discredit them. The Duke of Clarence referred to Conroy as "King John", while the Duchess of Clarence wrote to the Duchess of Kent to advise that she was increasingly isolating herself from the royal family and that she must not grant Conroy too much power.

The Duke of Clarence became King William IV in 1830, by which point Conroy felt very confident of his position; his control of the household was secure. The Duchess prevented her daughter from attending William's coronation out of a disagreement of precedence, (Note: King William ordered that Victoria follow his brothers down the aisle during the coronation. The Duchess interpreted this as a deliberate slight.) a decision attributed by the Duke of Wellington to Conroy. By then, it had become clear to Victoria that she would succeed to the throne. The new king and queen attempted to gain custody of their niece, but Conroy quickly replied that Victoria could not be "tainted" by the moral atmosphere at court. Conroy solidified the stance that mother and daughter could not be separated, and continued to promote the Duchess' virtue as a fit regent.

As William IV intensely disliked the Duchess and Conroy, he vowed to live until Victoria came of age simply to keep them from a regency. In 1831, the year of William's coronation, Conroy and the Duchess embarked on a series of royal tours with Victoria to expose her to the people and solidify their status as potential regents. On one trip Conroy was awarded an honorary degree by the University of Oxford. Their efforts were ultimately successful and, in November 1831, it was declared that the Duchess would be sole regent in the event of Victoria's young queenship, while Conroy could claim to be the closest adviser to the Duchess and her daughter.

Aware that a regency was becoming increasingly unlikely, Conroy and the Duchess began promoting the view of Victoria as a "weak-minded, frivolous and foolish" girl in need of guidance. While increasing their bullying of the princess, they implied that Victoria desired a regency even if she succeeded later than her majority at eighteen. Victoria was forbidden to be alone with her beloved Lehzen; either the Duchess's ally Lady Flora Hastings or a Conroy sister (now appointed as companions) were required to accompany her.

In 1835, Victoria became seriously ill of typhoid fever on the last of the royal tours. Exploiting her weakened state, the Duchess and Conroy unsuccessfully tried to force her into signing a document; this document would have appointed Conroy her personal secretary upon her accession. Victoria emerged from the incident more determined than ever to become self-reliant. Her increased intransigence alarmed the Duchess. At her behest, family adviser Baron Stockmar investigated, recommending to the Duchess that she dismiss Conroy and make peace with her daughter. But Conroy easily convinced the Duchess to ignore Stockmar's advice. Even after Victoria's eighteenth birthday on 24 May 1837, Conroy continued to pressure her to appoint him as her private secretary or acknowledge her need for a regent until she turned twenty-one.

=== Victoria in power ===
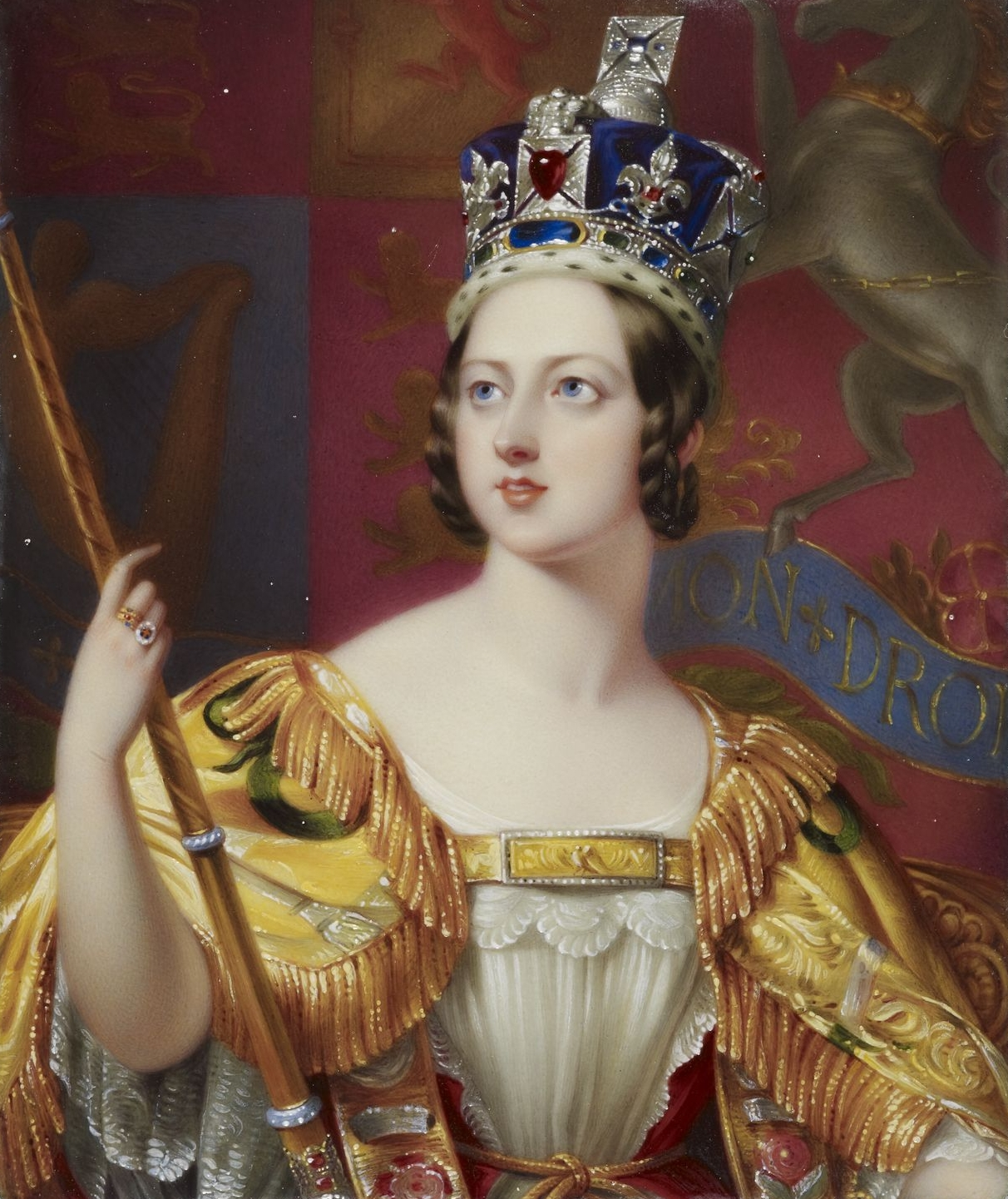
Victoria's ascension to the throne in 1837 led to Conroy's banishment from her household.

William IV died just weeks after Victoria's eighteenth birthday and she succeeded him as sovereign. Conroy was the subject of numerous discussions Victoria had with Stockmar on the first day of her reign. At the same time, Conroy created a list of demands to give to Stockmar with the intent that he pass them on to Prime Minister, Lord Melbourne. Conroy demanded "a pension of £3,000 a year, the Grand Cross of the Order of the Bath, a peerage and a seat on the Privy Council." Victoria left the negotiating to Melbourne, who agreed to most of Conroy's demands, most likely to avoid a scandal. On the advice of Melbourne, Conroy was granted a baronetcy and a pension of £3,000 per annum. This did not satisfy Conroy, who continued in the following years to petition Victoria for an Irish peerage. Each request was refused, as the peerage would have enabled him to attend court.

One of Victoria's first acts as queen was to dismiss Conroy from her own household, though she could not dismiss him from her mother's. Queen Victoria, as an unmarried young woman, was still expected to live with her mother, but she relegated the Duchess and Conroy to remote apartments at Buckingham Palace, cutting off personal contact with them. The Duchess unsuccessfully insisted that Conroy and his family be allowed at court; Victoria disagreed, saying: "I thought you would not expect me to invite Sir John Conroy after his conduct towards me for some years past." In 1839, the Duke of Wellington convinced Conroy to leave the Duchess's household and take his family to the Continent in effective exile. The Times reported that he no longer had official duties, though they were unsure if he had resigned or been dismissed. That year rumours abounded that Lady Flora Hastings, whose abdomen had grown large, was pregnant by Conroy. A subsequent medical investigation concluded that Lady Flora was a virgin and she died from liver cancer several months later. This scandal, in tandem with the Bedchamber Crisis, damaged Victoria's reputation.

=== Later life and death ===
In 1842, Conroy settled at his family home in Arborfield Hall near Reading, Berkshire, and became a gentleman farmer, winning prizes for his pig breeding. Princess Sophia's substantial income, provided from the civil list, had allowed Conroy to enjoy a wealthy lifestyle. Sophia died in 1848, leaving only £1,607 19s 7d in her bank accounts despite a lifestyle of savings and low expenses. The Duke of Cambridge and the Duchess of Gloucester had a lawyer write to Conroy demanding that he account for the rest of their sister's funds, but Conroy simply ignored it. According to Flora Fraser, the most recent biographer of George III's daughters, Sophia had in fact personally spent huge sums on Conroy, including heavy contributions to the purchase prices of his residences and supporting his family in a style he judged appropriate to their position. Conroy ultimately received £148,000 in gifts and money from Sophia. He was appointed as lieutenant colonel commandant in the Royal Montgomeryshire Militia on 30 August 1852 when it was being reformed as a rifle regiment. Despite his pensions and ownership of properties and lead mines in Wales, Conroy was in substantial debt when he died on 2 March 1854 at Arborfield. His eldest son Edward succeeded him to the baronetcy. After his death, the Duchess of Kent finally agreed to open her financial accounts and acknowledged that significant funds were missing. She was moved to admit that Conroy had swindled her while at the same time hurting her relationship with Victoria for his own benefit. A rapprochement followed between mother and daughter. In 1850, the Duchess of Kent's new comptroller, Sir George Couper, had already examined the accounts and found major discrepancies. No records had been kept for her household or personal expenses after 1829, and there was also no record for nearly £50,000 received from her brother Leopold, nor for an additional £10,000 from William IV.

== Historiography ==
After Conroy's departure from Victoria's service in 1837, a popular song read:

Conroy goes not to Court, the reason's plain
King John has played his part and ceased to reign.

Following his death in 1854, The Times published a positive obituary that declared "the name, person and character of Sir John Conroy are so well and, in many respects, so favourably known in British society that we have no doubt the announcement of his death will be received with feelings of general regret". The article briefly summarised his lifetime and praised Conroy for "considerable shrewdness, no small knowledge of human nature and a very winning address" as well as "devoting himself with great zeal and assiduity" to members of the royal family.

Described in his own lifetime as a "ridiculous fellow", Conroy has not been the recipient of much recent positive historical opinion. Twentieth-century historian Christopher Hibbert writes that Conroy was a "good-looking man of insinuating charm, tall, imposing, vain, clever, unscrupulous, plausible and of limitless ambition." For her part, 21st-century historian Gillian Gill describes Conroy as "a career adventurer, expert manipulator and domestic martinet" who came to England with "small means, some ability and mighty ambition." In 2004, Elizabeth Longford wrote that Conroy "was not the arch-villain Victoria painted, but the victim of his own inordinate ambition."

=== Suspected lover of the Duchess ===
Conroy's relationship with the Duchess was the subject of much speculation both before and after his death in 1854. When the Duke of Wellington was asked if the Duchess and Conroy were lovers, he replied that he "supposed so". In August 1829, Wellington reported to court diarist Charles Greville that Victoria, then ten years old, had caught Conroy and her mother engaged in "some familiarities". (Note: Kate Williams believes that Wellington heard about this from another member of the Royal Family, possibly the Duke or Duchess of Clarence.) Victoria told her governess, Baroness Lehzen, who in turn told Madame de Spaeth, one of the Duchess's ladies-in-waiting. De Spaeth confronted the Duchess about the relationship and was immediately dismissed. All of this was recorded by Greville; his subsequent diary entry has led to the persistent belief that the Duchess and Conroy were lovers. Later, as an aged Queen, Victoria was aghast to discover that many people did indeed believe that her mother and Conroy were intimate and stated that the Duchess' piety would have prevented this.

=== Rumour that Conroy was Queen Victoria's father ===
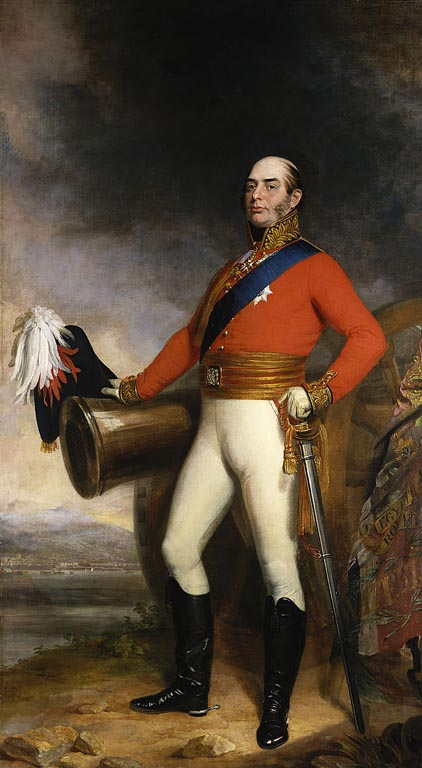
The subject of Victoria's paternity has been a matter of debate, with candidates ranging from the Duke of Kent (pictured) to John Conroy.

During Victoria's lifetime and after her death in 1901, there have been rumours that Conroy or someone else, and not the Duke of Kent, was her biological father. Historians have continued to debate the accuracy and validity of these claims. In his 2003 work The Victorians, biographer A. N. Wilson suggests that Victoria was not actually descended from George III because several of her descendants had haemophilia, which was unknown among her recognised ancestors. Haemophilia is a disease that impairs the body's ability to control blood clotting. The most common cause of haemophilia is genetic, and is passed on by X-linked recessive inheritance; in other words, it can be passed on by both males and females, while the symptoms manifest mostly in males. Wilson proposes that the Duchess of Kent took a lover (not necessarily Conroy) to ensure that a Coburg would sit on the British throne.

Likewise, medical historian W. T. W. Potts considers it a possibility that the Duchess took a lover under pressure from her brother Leopold. He cites the rarity of genetic mutations as evidence, as well as the "remarkable" circumstances surrounding Victoria's conception. Potts makes no mention of Conroy specifically, only that the father would have been a haemophiliac himself or would have had a mutated gene.

Haemophilia B has been known to arise spontaneously in the children of older fathers, and the Duke of Kent was fifty-one when Victoria was born. Nicholas Wright Gillham proposes that the haemophilia mutation could have first occurred with either Victoria or the Duke of Kent. Gillian Gill and her son Christopher, an infectious disease specialist, also view a genetic mutation as the most likely possibility; Gillian Gill writes that "a few historians in recent years have found it seductive" to doubt Victoria's stated paternity because a random mutation is "an unexciting solution". Helen Rappaport concurs, remarking that "the best and most logical" explanation is that haemophilia first appeared in Victoria as a mutation.

Alan Rushton adds that no one in the household of the newly married Duchess of Kent, including Conroy, is known to have had haemophilia, and that her probable awareness of the scandals surrounding the behaviour of Caroline of Brunswick and Caroline Matilda of Great Britain would have deterred her from seeking an affair elsewhere. Furthermore, Princess Victoria was said to have borne a strong family resemblance to her father and grandfather George III.

There is evidence that some of Victoria's descendants did have mild porphyria (although some historians now think it could have been bi-polar disorder), most notably Princess Feodora of Saxe-Meiningen. This disease probably affected her grandfather, George III and this could give credence to Victoria's legitimate birth. There is more reliable documentation that one of her great-great-grandsons, Prince William of Gloucester, was diagnosed with the disease shortly before his death when his aircraft crashed during an air race. However note that, due to intermarriage, Prince William's grandmother Queen Consort Mary of Teck was a granddaughter of George III's son and Edward's younger brother Adolphus. Concrete evidence on the origins of the disease and paternity of Victoria could be achieved with a DNA test of her or her parents' remains, but no such study has been sanctioned by the Royal Family.

== In popular culture ==
Conroy has been portrayed numerous times in film and television. Herbert Wilcox's Victoria the Great (1937) depicted Conroy as a "smarmy character" who is not well developed in the film. The baronet was played by Stefan Skodler in 1954's The Story of Vickie, and Herbert Hübner in Mädchenjahre einer Königin (1936). Patrick Malahide played Conroy in Victoria & Albert, a 2001 TV miniseries that depicted Victoria's early influences. English actor Mark Strong played him in the 2009 film The Young Victoria. The film depicts Conroy as a maniacal, controlling pseudo-father to the young Victoria during the year preceding her accession, even going so far as depicting him assaulting the princess twice. The film goes on to depict Conroy's expulsion from Queen Victoria's household.

Conroy also appears in numerous historical fiction novels about Queen Victoria. Writing under the pen names Jean Plaidy and Eleanor Burford, author Eleanor Hibbert published a series of novels in the 1970s and 1980s, which included The Captive of Kensington Palace (1972), The Queen and Lord M (1973) and Victoria Victorious: The Story of Queen Victoria (1985). A. E. Moorat released the parody novel Queen Victoria: Demon Hunter in 2009.

== Patrilineal descent ==
The Conroy family claimed descent from the Ó Maolconaire family of Elphin, County Roscommon, although there is no reliable evidence of this, and such claims of exalted ancestry were at this time more commonly made than justified. The Ó Maolconaire family had been the hereditary Ollamhs to the O'Connor Kings of Connacht. The claimed descent was from Maoilin Ó Maolchonaire who was the last recognised Chief of the Sept.

1. Torna Mór Ó Maolchonaire, Chief of the Sept, d. 1435
2. Seán Rua Ó Maolchonaire
3. Domhnall Rua Ó Maolchonaire, d. 1504
4. Conchobhar Ó Maolchonaire, Chief of the Sept, d. 1533
5. Maolmhuire Ó Maolchonaire, Chief of the Sept
6. Maoilin Ó Maolchonaire, Last Chief of the Sept, d. 1637
7. Torna Ó Maolchonaire
8. Seán Ó Maolchonaire, d. 1672 fighting for the French during the Franco-Dutch War
9. Ferfeasa Conry, d. 1746
10. John Conry of Elphin, d. 1769
11. John Conry, d. 1795
12. Sir John Ponsonby Conroy, 1st Baronet (1786 -1854)

== Honours ==
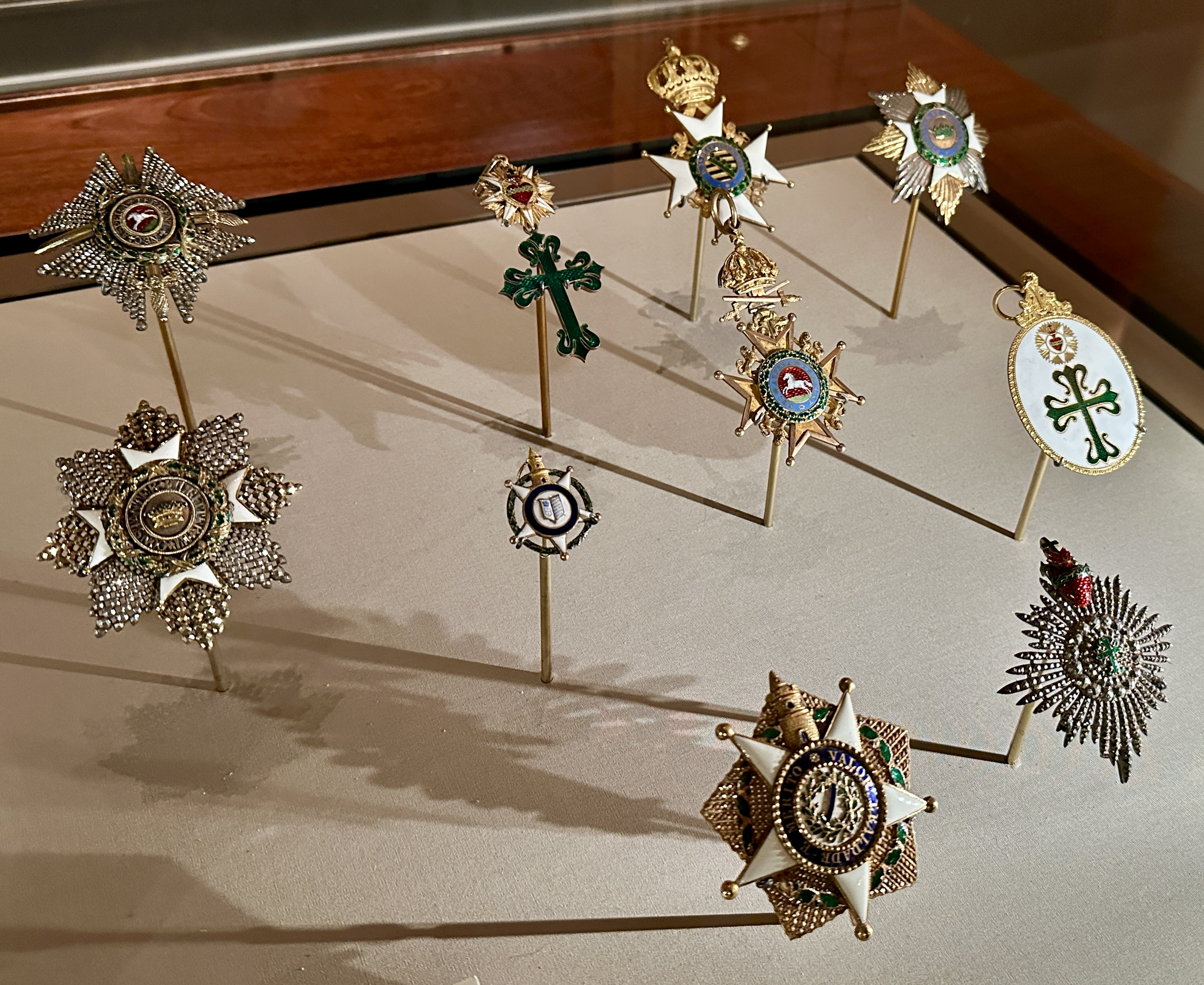
Conroy's medals on display in Kensington Palace

- Kingdom of Great Britain: Knight Bachelor, 1827
- Kingdom of Hanover: Knight Commander of the Royal Hanoverian Guelphic Order, 1827
- (Saxe-Coburg and Gotha) (Duchy of Saxe-Altenburg) (Saxe-Meiningen) Ernestine duchies: Grand Cross of the Saxe-Ernestine House Order, July 1835
- Kingdom of Portugal:
  - Commander of the Order of the Tower and Sword
  - Grand Cross of the Order of St. Benedict of Aviz

== Notes ==
Baronetage of the United Kingdom
New creation	Baronet (of Llanbrynmair); 1837–1854	Succeeded by Edward Conroy
