= Louise, Baroness Lehzen =

Governess and companion to Queen Victoria (1784–1870)

The Baroness Lehzen
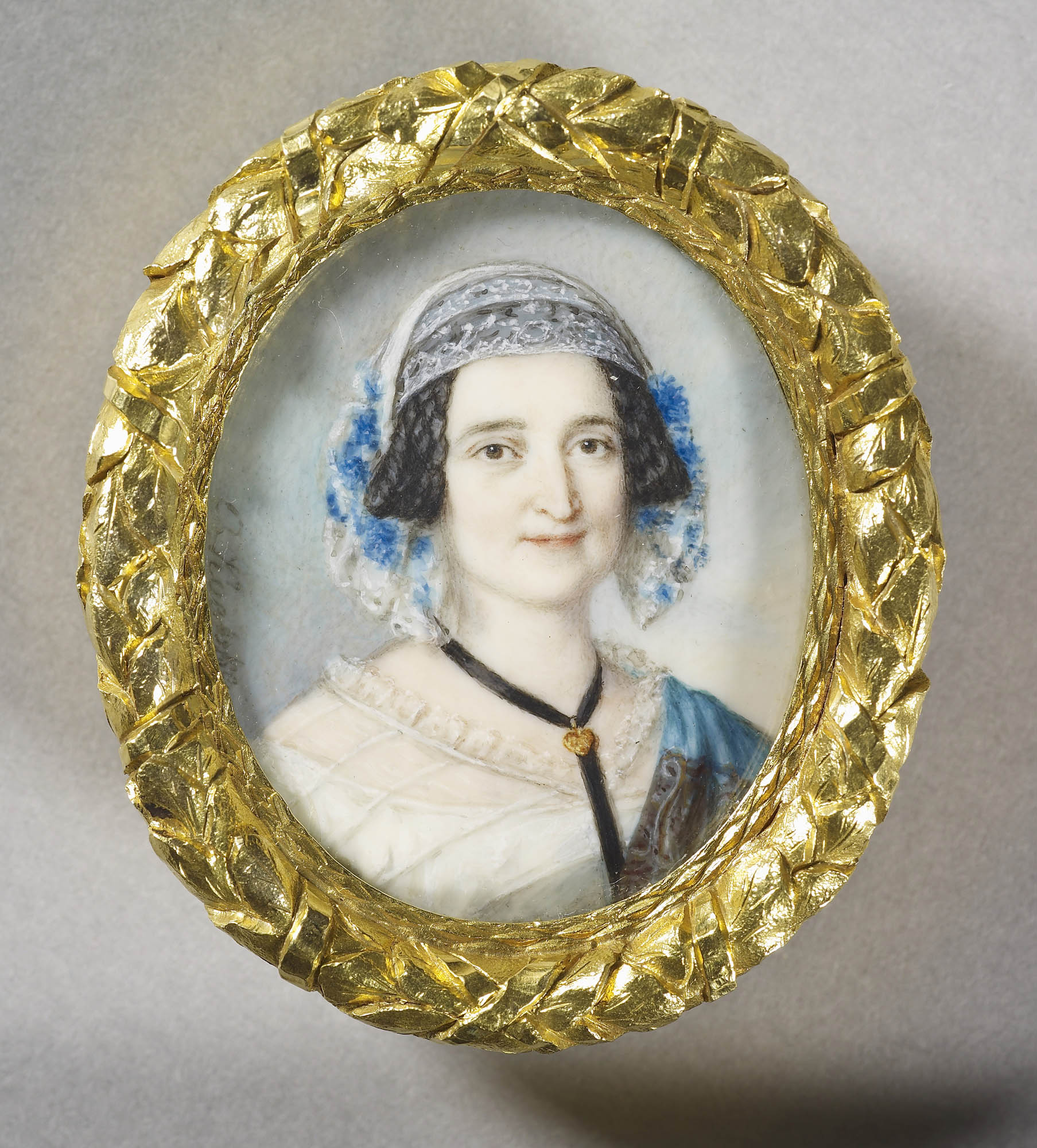
- Portrait by Koepke for Queen Victoria, c. 1842
- Known for: Governess and companion to Queen Victoria
- Born: Johanna Clara Louise Lehzen; 3 October 1784; Hanover, Electorate of Hanover
- Died: 9 September 1870 (aged 85); Bückeburg, Principality of Schaumburg-Lippe

Johanna Clara Louise, Baroness von Lehzen (3 October 1784 – 9 September 1870) was the governess and later companion to Queen Victoria of the United Kingdom.

Lehzen was born to a Lutheran pastor Joachim Friedrich Lehzen (1735–1800) and his wife, Marie Catharina Melusine Palm (1745–1793), herself the daughter of a priest. In 1819 she entered the household of the Duke of Kent, fourth son of King George III. Five years later, Lehzen was appointed governess to his only child, Princess Alexandrina Victoria. The young princess became second-in-line to the British throne in 1827.

Victoria's upbringing was dominated by the controlling Kensington System, implemented by the widowed Duchess of Kent and her comptroller Sir John Conroy. Lehzen was strongly protective of Victoria, and encouraged the princess to be strong, informed, and independent from the Duchess and Conroy's influence, causing friction within the household. Attempts to remove the governess were unsuccessful, as Lehzen had the support of Victoria's royal uncles. "Dear, good Lehzen" soon came to supersede all others – including her own mother – in Victoria's eyes.

When Victoria became queen in 1837, Lehzen served as a sort of unofficial private secretary, enjoying apartments adjacent to Victoria. The queen's marriage to Prince Albert in 1840 led to significant changes in the royal household. Albert and Lehzen detested each other, and after an illness of the Princess Royal in 1841, Lehzen was dismissed. Her close relationship with the queen came to an end, although the two continued to correspond. Lehzen spent her final years in Hanover on a generous pension, dying in 1870. Lehzen was a major influence on Victoria's character, in particular giving her the strength of will to survive her troubled childhood and life as a young queen.

== Family and early life ==
Johanna Clara Louise Lehzen was born on 3 October 1784 in Hanover, the youngest of ten children born to the Lutheran pastor Joachim Friedrich Lehzen and his wife, Melusine Palm. Forced by circumstances to work from a young age, Lehzen was employed by the aristocratic German von Marenholtz family. She served as governess to the family's three daughters, and earned positive references.

Based on these references, Lehzen joined the household of Princess Victoria, Duchess of Kent in December 1818. She served as governess to the Duchess's twelve-year-old daughter from her first marriage, Princess Feodora of Leiningen. Victoria had married Prince Edward, Duke of Kent and Strathearn, who was, at the time, fourth in line to the British throne. Lehzen and the rest of the household moved to England in the first half of 1819 so that the new Duchess of Kent's child could be born there, strengthening the child's claim to the throne. The baby was a girl, christened Alexandrina Victoria after her mother and her godfather, Alexander I of Russia; she would grow up to be Queen Victoria.

== Tutor to Princess Victoria ==
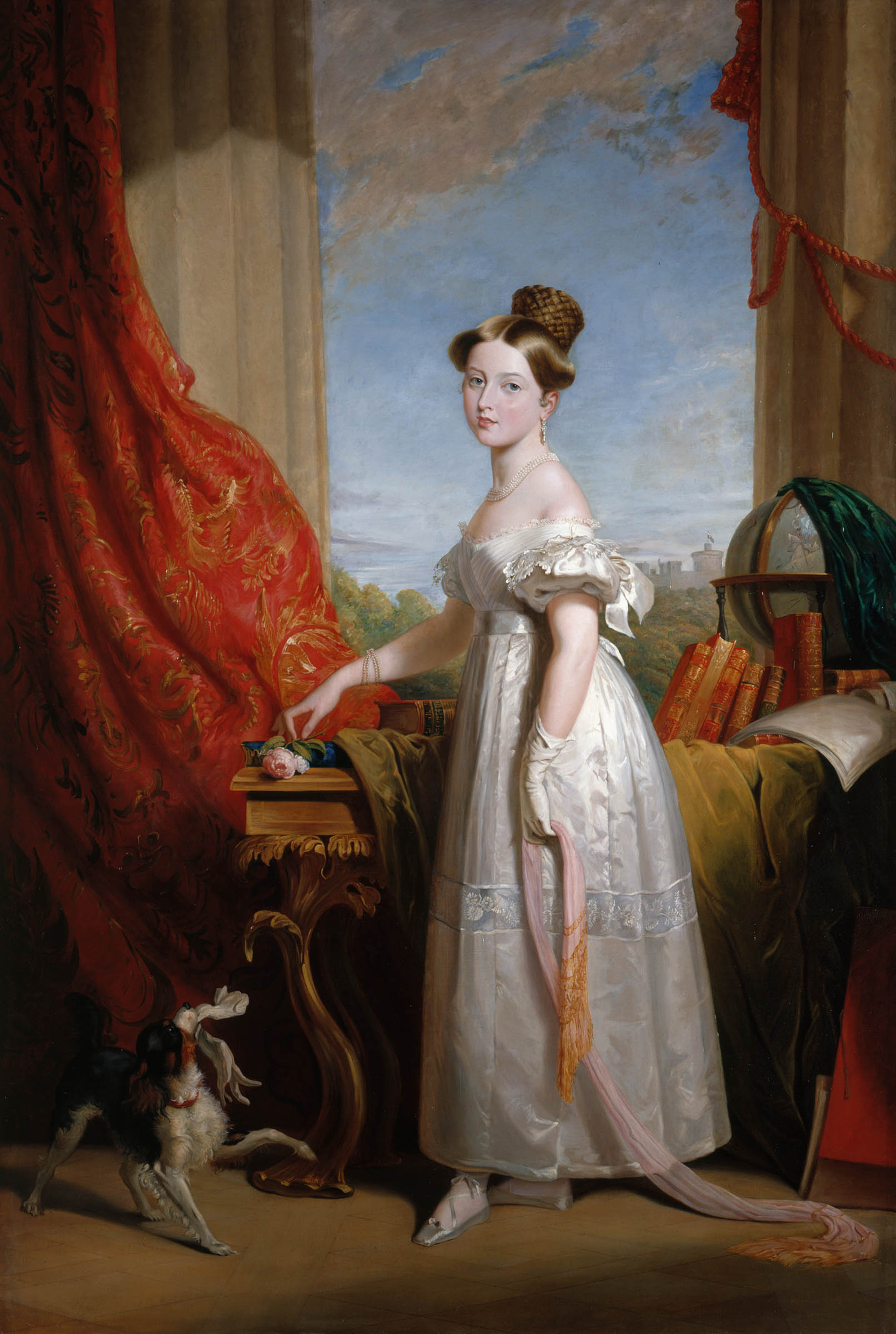
Princess Victoria with her spaniel Dash in a painting by George Hayter, 1833

The Duke of Kent died quite suddenly in 1820, followed quickly by his father, King George III. Victoria's uncle, the Prince Regent, ascended the throne as King George IV. Victoria was now third in line to the throne, after her uncles the Duke of York and the Duke of Clarence, both of whom were well past middle age and neither of whom had legitimate heirs. As the likely eventual heir, Victoria had to be educated accordingly. Feodora was now 14, and no longer required the services of a governess. After the dismissal of nursemaid Mrs. Brock, Lehzen – as she was always known in the household – took over five-year-old Victoria's care in 1824. The Duchess and her comptroller, John Conroy, made the appointment not only because Lehzen was German (rather than English), but also because they believed she was unlikely to operate independently of their wishes.

The historian Christopher Hibbert describes Lehzen as "a handsome woman, despite her pointed nose and chin, clever, emotional, humourless". Though she at first feared Lehzen's stern manner, "dear, good Lehzen" soon came to occupy a place in Victoria's heart that superseded all others, including her own mother, the Duchess of Kent. Lehzen encouraged the princess to distrust her mother and her mother's friends, and to maintain her independence. The governess was uninterested in money and lacked ambition for herself, instead choosing to devote her time and energy to the princess. Victoria took to calling Lehzen "Mother" and "dearest Daisy" in private, writing Lehzen was "the most affectionate, devoted, attached, and disinterested friend I have". As part of the controlling Kensington System devised by Conroy, after 1824 Victoria was to be accompanied by Lehzen at all times during the day; consequently Lehzen was not allowed out to leave Victoria's side until the Duchess dismissed her at nighttime, and was required to hold the princess' hand when Victoria descended a staircase.

=== Baroness Lehzen ===
In 1827, the Duke of York died, making the Duke of Clarence heir presumptive, and Victoria second-in-line to the throne. King George IV expressed doubt that Lehzen was the proper candidate to prepare Victoria. In response, her mother and Conroy persuaded the king to award them both titles, so that the princess would not be surrounded by commoners; Lehzen became a Baroness of the Kingdom of Hanover. George IV died in 1830, and was succeeded by his brother the Duke of Clarence, who became King William IV. William formally recognised Victoria as his heir presumptive. According to Lehzen, around this time an infamous scene took place, in which Lehzen slipped a copy of the genealogy of the House of Hanover into one of the princess's lesson books. After perusing it for some time, Victoria came to see that her father had been next in line after the king, and that Queen Adelaide had no surviving children. This was the first time Victoria came to realise the destiny that had been assumed by many since her birth; that she would be the next British monarch. After a pause, Victoria is reported to have said "I will be good." This story entered into folk legend for future English generations.

King William appointed his friend, the Duchess of Northumberland, as Victoria's official governess in 1831, but the role was mostly ceremonial, and the princess continued to depend on Lehzen. The Duchess was dismissed in 1837 by Victoria's mother for attempting to become more influential in her royal charge's education. During this time, Lehzen held no official position at court; despite her recently acquired title, her commoner status continued to be a hindrance.

=== Educating Victoria ===
The wish of the Duchess and Conroy to keep Victoria dependent on their will was circumvented by Lehzen, who wanted her charge to become a strong, informed woman. As Victoria grew older, attempts were made by Conroy and the Duchess for Lehzen's removal, or at least the lessening of her influence. Such tactics proved unsuccessful, as the princess became more devoted to Lehzen than before, as evident in her journals. Lehzen's only true friend in the household, Baroness Spath, had been suddenly dismissed in 1828 on the orders of Conroy; rumours abounded that the baroness witnessed "familiarities" between him and the Duchess. Members of George IV's court speculated that Lehzen would be the next to leave, but she remained silent on the issue and preserved her position. In 1835, the Duchess of Kent wrote her daughter a stern letter demanding that Victoria develop a more formal and less intimate relationship with Lehzen. The same year (in which Victoria turned sixteen), plans to dismiss Lehzen fell apart after she devotedly nursed Victoria through a five-week illness. Lehzen aided a weakened Victoria in her refusal to sign a document prepared for her by Conroy and the Duchess that would guarantee him a position when she became queen. During her tenure, Lehzen had the support of George IV, William IV, and another of Victoria's uncles, Leopold I of Belgium, who all believed that she was vital to the princess's health, happiness, and continued resistance to Conroy's influence.

The education Victoria received from Lehzen was rudimentary but solid. Contrary to the prevailing attitudes of the time, Lehzen, tutor Dr. George Davys, and others successfully encouraged Victoria to enjoy acquiring knowledge. Davys was put in charge of the "solid department of her studies", while Lehzen concentrated on the "more ornamental departments", such as dancing. Gaining an "enlightened education", the princess learned to speak French, German, Latin, and English, liked history and was taught economics, geography, mathematics, politics, art, and music. Lehzen was strict, but rewarded the princess when she was obedient. In another departure from the era, Lehzen employed little to no corporal punishment; at least, there is no record of it in the household accounts.

== Victoria in power ==
When Victoria ascended the throne in 1837, Lehzen enjoyed a prominent position at the coronation, and remained at court. At her request, she was given no official position, but agreed on a new title, "lady attendant". In her role, she was installed at Buckingham Palace as a sort of unofficial private secretary, served as chief liaison for the royal residences, and carried the household keys as a sign of her position; her signature was required for all payments of tradesmen's bills. At this point, it seems that Lehzen had totally replaced Victoria's mother both in terms of influence and affection; Lehzen's apartments adjoined the queen's, while the Duchess of Kent was installed in a suite of rooms far removed from Victoria. For the first few years of Victoria's reign, especially before her marriage to Prince Albert of Saxe-Coburg and Gotha in 1840, Lehzen had a very strong influence on the queen's outlook on both politics and personal matters, despite the fact that she did not overtly involve herself in state affairs. Even after the queen's marriage, Lehzen retained the private doorway into the royal bedroom, a source of displeasure for Victoria's new husband.

=== Supplanted by Prince Albert ===
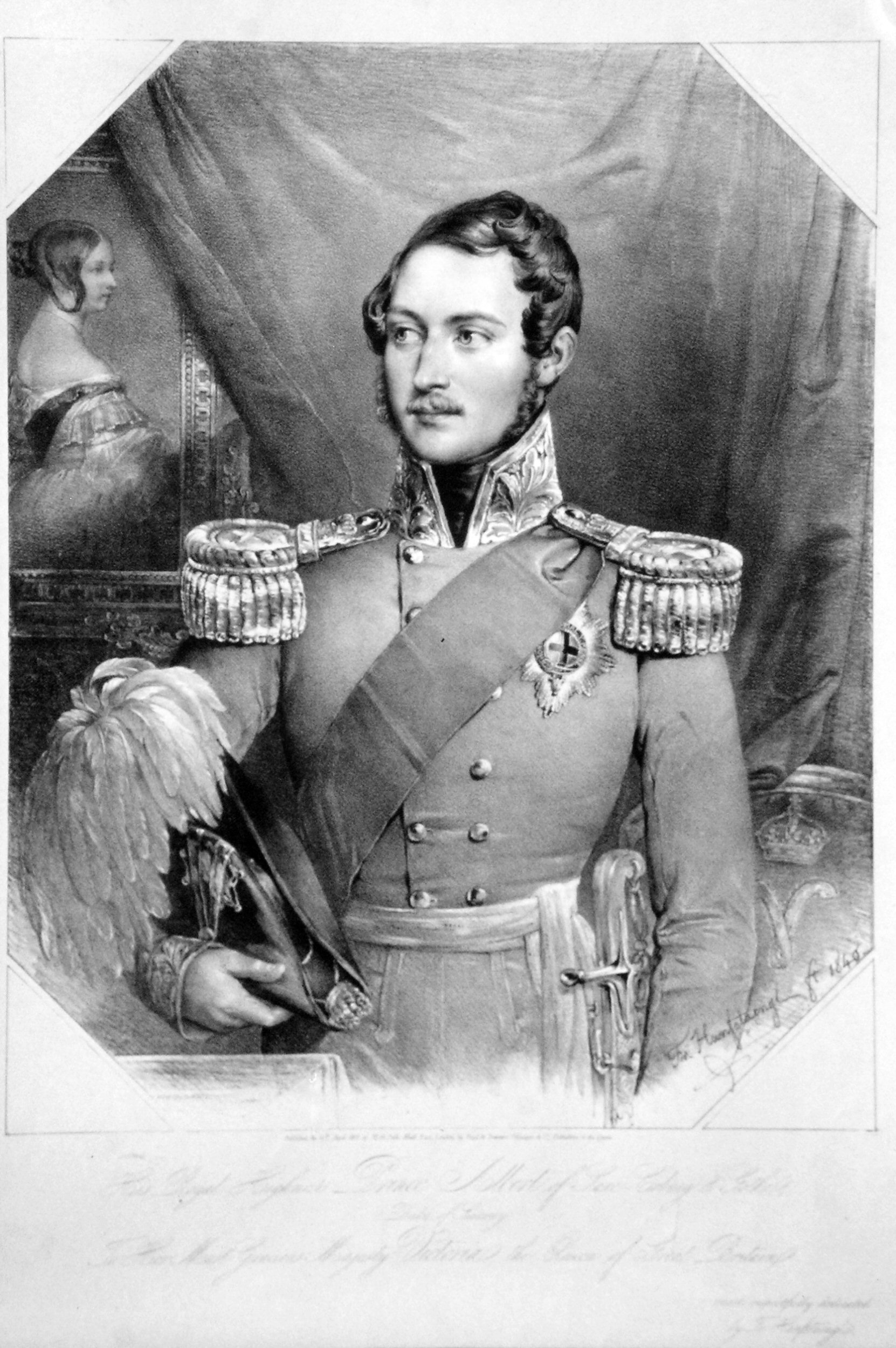
Victoria's marriage to Prince Albert led to disagreements and Lehzen's eventual dismissal.

The arrival of Prince Albert led to significant changes in Victoria's household. Lehzen had opposed Coburg ambitions of Victoria marrying Albert, believing the princess to be a "second Queen Elizabeth, virgin and independent of male influence". Albert was well-educated, and had just completed a tour of Europe, preceded by years at the University of Bonn. Victoria's court dismayed his puritan German sensibilities. Lehzen and Albert soon developed a dislike for each other; she regularly thwarted Albert's will in the running of the household; meanwhile, he found her personally repellent and unworthy of befriending the queen, openly referring to her as "the hag" and a "crazy stupid intriguer".

When Victoria's first child, the Princess Royal, was born, Victoria trusted Lehzen to make the arrangements for the nursery. Lehzen placed it in the care of various staff as well as Sir James Clark, despite Albert's objections that the physician was wholly unsuited to the post, having already discredited himself during the affair of Lady Flora Hastings a year previously. (Note: In 1839 it was observed by the ladies of the court, including Victoria, that the unmarried Lady Flora Hastings was showing a steadily increasing abdominal girth, a sign of becoming illicitly pregnant. Clark was called upon to express his opinion on her condition, and announced Hastings was pregnant, when in fact she had an ultimately fatal abdominal tumour. His mistaken support for court slander of a guiltless woman, and her death in that year from a condition undiagnosed by him led to popular censure.) At fourteen months the Princess Royal fell ill, losing her appetite and appearing pale and feverish. Dr Clark declared it a minor ailment, incorrectly prescribing her with calomel, a medication laced with mercury and laudanum. In fact, it is more likely that the precocious princess was simply expressing her dismay at changes in the royal nursery, then occurring with the arrival of her younger brother. Albert, a devoted father, confronted Victoria on the incompetence of the staff selected by Lehzen. There was a quarrel, after which Albert declared that he would leave the affair in her queenly hands, and placed it on her conscience if the child died.

Soon after this argument Victoria conceded to her husband, not wishing to see him unhappy. She made a final attempt to defend Lehzen, describing her as a selflessly loyal woman who deserved to remain close to her former charge. But in the face of Albert's resolve, Victoria dismissed Lehzen, ostensibly for her health. To Albert, Lehzen was a servant who had attempted to rise above her place in life, and he wanted Victoria to rely on him alone. Lehzen accepted the fiction of ill health, and agreed to depart. In the days leading up to her exit, she taught some of her duties to Marianne Skerrett, one of Victoria's dressers, and returned her keys to the queen. Lehzen departed on 30 September 1842, leaving a note rather than speaking directly with Victoria, believing that this would be less painful. The queen was initially unaccustomed to Lehzen's absence, having spent almost her whole life up to that point in the presence of the former governess. "It was very painful to me... waking this morning, and recollecting she was really quite away", Victoria said.

Word of Lehzen's departure spread through the court and elsewhere. Reports of the cause varied; the court diarist Charles Greville noted she was leaving "for her health (as she says), to stay five or six months, but it is supposed never to return". The Times however reported that she was simply visiting friends in Germany. After her departure, family adviser Baron Stockmar remarked of the affair that

[I]t was not without great difficulty that the Prince succeeded in getting rid of [Lehzen]. She was foolish enough to contest his influence, and not to conform herself to the change in her position... If she had done so, and conciliated the P[rince], she might have remained in the Palace to the end of her life.

== Death and legacy ==
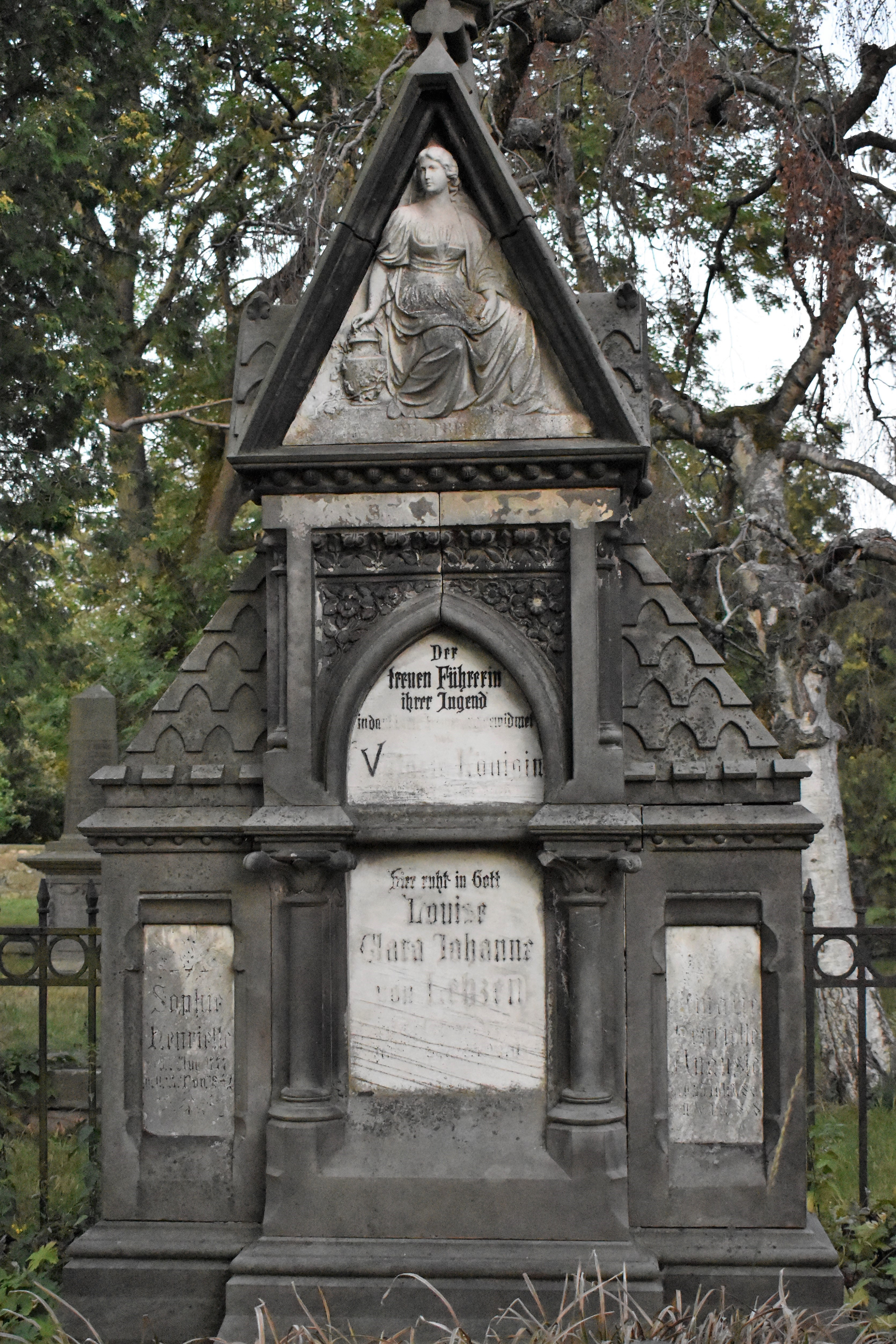
Tomb of Louise Lehzen at the Jetenburg Cemetery in Bückeburg.

When Lehzen was dismissed from the court she returned to her native Germany, living in Bückeburg. She lived with her sister on the generous pension provided by Victoria, a yearly sum of £800. She covered the walls of her house with portraits of the queen. Though her sister died several months later, the baroness continued to support financially her many nieces and nephews. Lehzen continued to regard Victoria with affection, and the queen wrote regularly to her former governess, weekly at first and later monthly at Lehzen's request. When visiting relations in Germany, the queen came to visit her twice in private. The Baroness Lehzen died in Bückeburg on 9 September 1870, where she is buried in Jetenburger cemetery. Queen Victoria ordered the erection of a memorial to her. After Lehzen's death, Queen Victoria spoke of her gratitude for their relationship, but commented "after I came to the throne she got to be rather trying, and especially so after my marriage... [This was not] from any evil intention, only from a mistaken idea of duty and affection for me."

During her time at the British court, Lehzen attracted attention outside of the royal household for her close relationship with Victoria. She was criticised for her influence with the queen, particularly from those who disliked German influences at court. Pamphlets, many released by the Tory party, complained of the "stranger harboured in our country" and the "evil counsellors" surrounding Victoria. One in particular, published as the Warning Letter to Baroness Lehzen, declared that a "certain foreign lady pulled the wires of a diabolical conspiracy of which Lady Flora was to be the first victim", a reference to the Lady Flora Hastings affair. More positive, The Times once described her as having simply "held a highly and strictly confidential situation about the person of the Sovereign". As a sign of the perceived political influence she possessed, in 1838 false rumours suggested that Lehzen had been "converted" to the Whig party, and that she had been offered "an urgent proposal of marriage" by Whig prime minister Viscount Melbourne. Despite all of this criticism, the historian Gillian Gill describes how Lehzen was honest and frugal; even after Victoria ascended the throne, she seems to have made no demands for money or rank, preferring instead to simply be in the queen's company. The historian K. D. Reynolds adds that Lehzen was a major influence on Victoria's character and moral development, in particular giving the queen the strength of will to survive her troubled childhood and young queenship. Not all of her influence was positive, however; Reynolds also speculates that the 1839 Bedchamber crisis stemmed partly from Victoria's unwillingness to lose Lehzen.

Baroness Lehzen has been portrayed numerous times in film and television. She was played by Renée Stobrawa in the 1936 German film Mädchenjahre einer Königin, Greta Schröder in the films Victoria the Great and Sixty Glorious Years, Barbara Everest in 1941's The Prime Minister, Magda Schneider in the 1954 television serial The Story of Vickie, Olga Fabian in an episode of Hallmark Hall of Fame, Patience Collier in Edward the Seventh, Diana Rigg in the 2001 television serial Victoria & Albert, Jeanette Hain in the 2009 film The Young Victoria, and Daniela Holtz in the 2016 television series Victoria.
