= Portrait of John Conroy =

1837 painting by Henry William Pickersgill

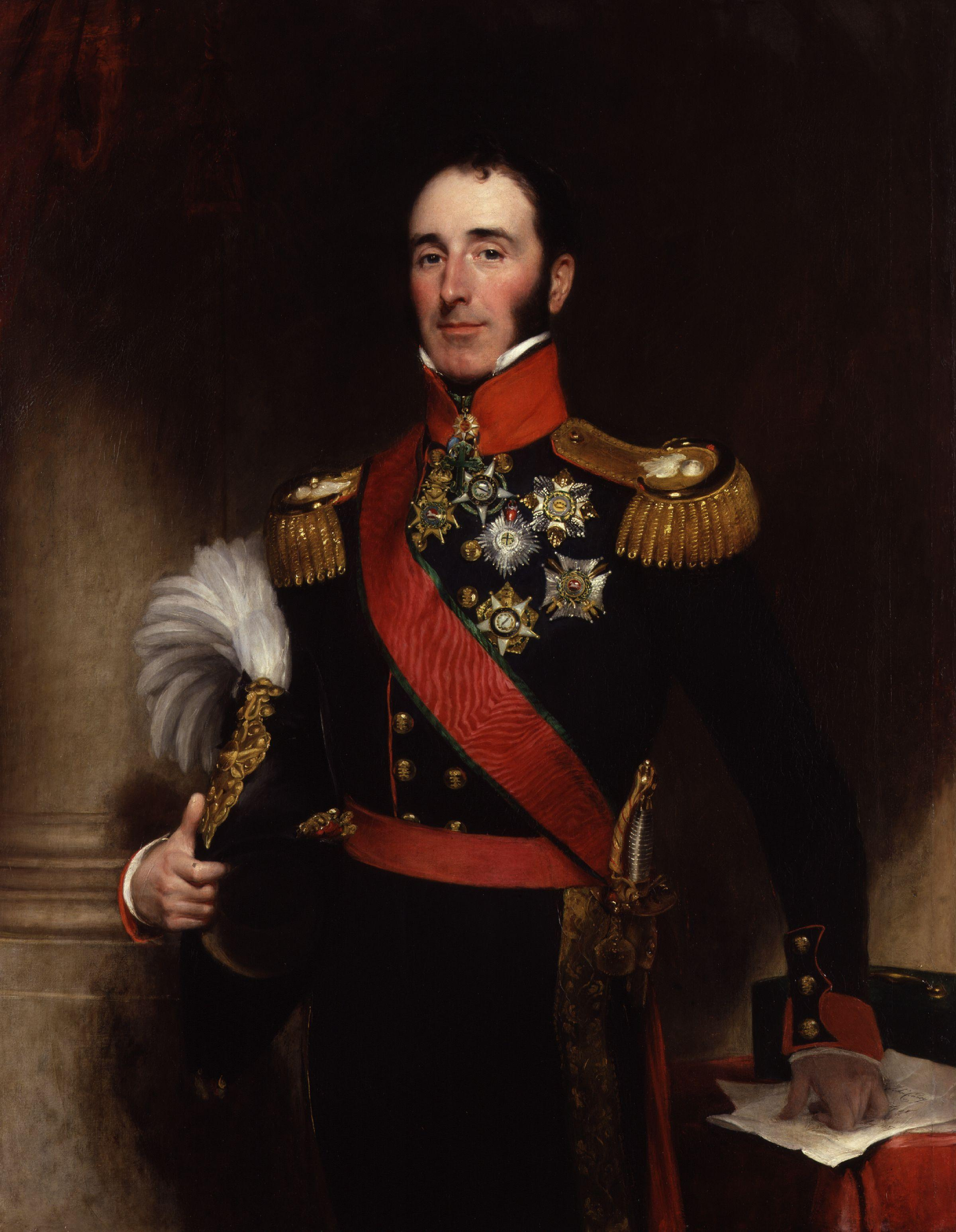
- Artist: Henry William Pickersgill
- Year: 1837
- Type: Oil on canvas, portrait painting
- Dimensions: 142.5 cm × 111.5 cm (56.1 in × 43.9 in)
- Location: National Portrait Gallery, London

Portrait of John Conroy is an oil on canvas portrait by the English painter Henry William Pickersgill, from 1837. It is a depiction of the British military officer John Conroy.

== History ==
Pickersgill emerged as a prominent portraitist during the Regency era and was hailed as one of the natural successors to Thomas Lawrence in 1830.

Conroy, appointed as an equerry to the Duke of Kent in 1817, became a controversial figure following the Duke's death due to his close relationship with widowed Duchess of Kent, the mother of the heir to the throne Princess Victoria. During Victoria's childhood they imposed the Kensington System, and when she succeeded her uncle William IV to the throne in 1837, they had hopes of strongly influencing the young queen. However, having attained her majority the eighteen year-old Victoria broke from their control.

The picture was displayed at the Royal Academy Exhibition of 1837, the first to be held at the National Gallery, rather than Somerset House. Today the painting is in the collection of the National Portrait Gallery, in London, having been purchased in 1980, although it is on display at Kensington Palace.

== Bibliography ==
- Murphy, Deirdre. The Young Victoria. Yale University Press, 2019.
- Ormond, Richard. Early Victorian Portraits, National Portrait Gallery, 1974.
