= Kensington System =

Intricate rules set for the future Queen Victoria

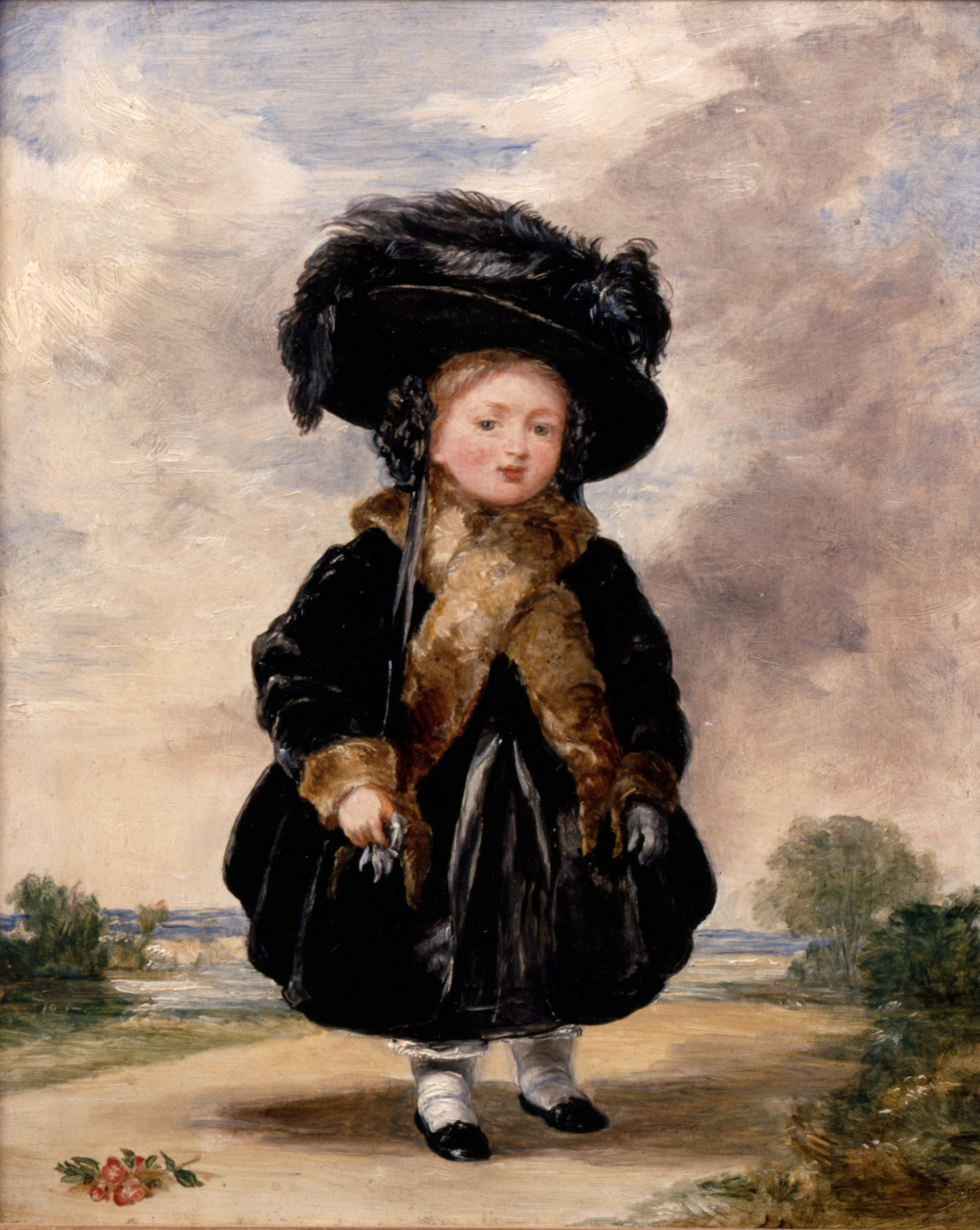
Princess Victoria at age four

The Kensington System is the term applied by historians to the strict and elaborate set of rules designed by Victoria, Duchess of Kent, along with her attendant, Sir John Conroy, concerning the upbringing of the Duchess's daughter, the future Queen Victoria. It is named after Kensington Palace in London, where they resided prior to Queen Victoria's accession to the throne.

== Application ==
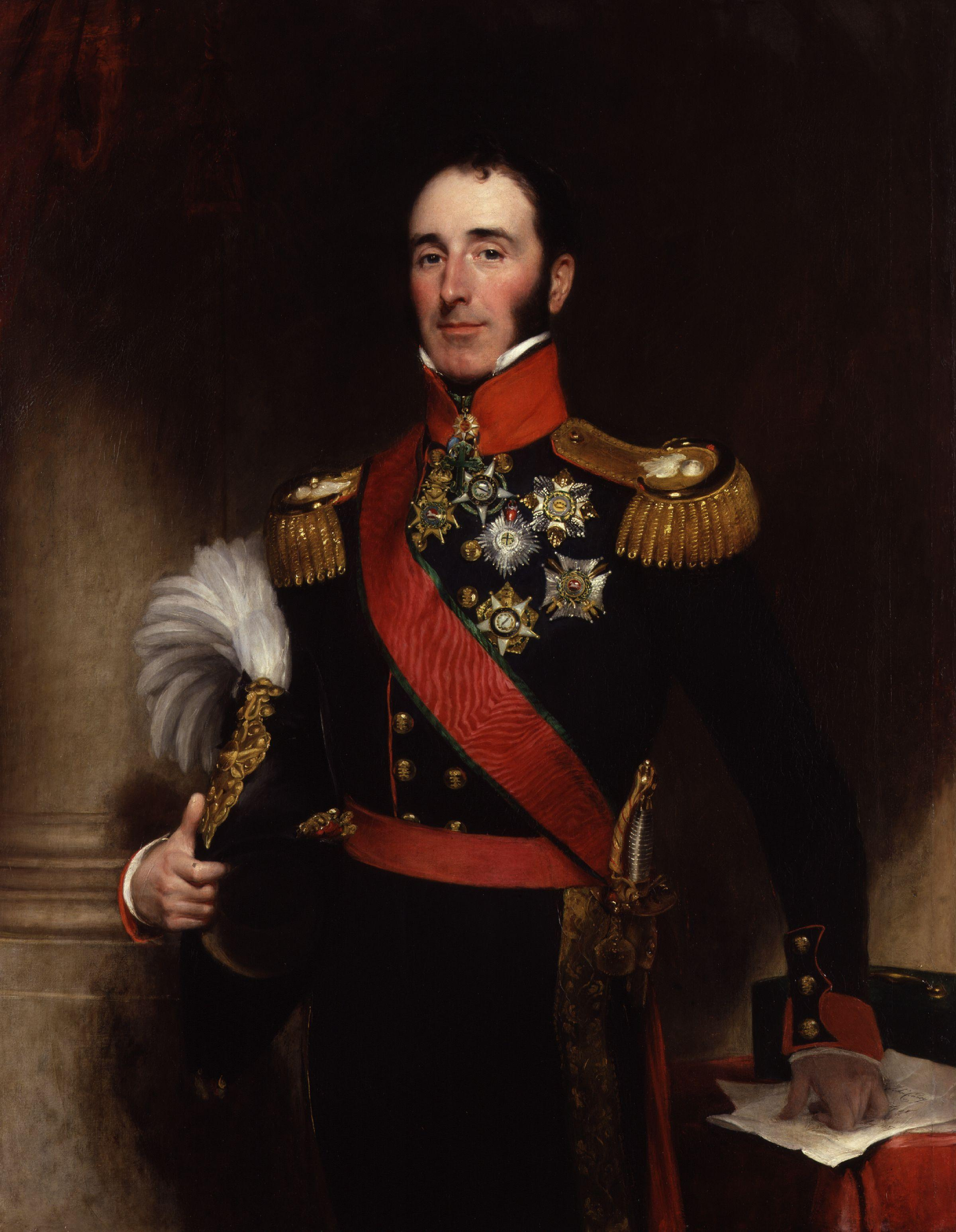
Portrait of John Conroy by Henry William Pickersgill, 1837

The System was aimed at rendering the young Princess Victoria weak and dependent and thus unlikely to adhere to her other relatives in the House of Hanover against her mother and Conroy. The young Victoria was never allowed to be apart from her mother, her tutor or her governesses (Baroness Lehzen and the Duchess of Northumberland). She was kept isolated from other children, and her mother and Conroy strictly monitored and recorded her every action and entirely controlled whom she was allowed to meet.

Victoria had only two playmates during her adolescence: her half-sister, Princess Feodora of Leiningen, and Conroy's daughter, Victoire. Only occasional trips were made outside the palace grounds; two visits to Claremont to see her uncle Leopold I of Belgium greatly influenced Victoria's opinion on the System. When it became clear that Victoria would inherit the throne, her keepers tried to induce Victoria to appoint Conroy her personal secretary and treasurer via a long series of threats and browbeating, to no avail.

Victoria's education began at the age of five. Her first teacher, Reverend George Davys, Dean of Chester, instructed her on scripture. The Duchess of Kent would personally drill her daughter after each lesson. At eight years old, Victoria began learning decorum, reading, and writing from Baroness Lehzen. She studied Greek, Latin, Italian, French, and German. The Duchess of Kent instituted a strict daily schedule for Victoria's education. Morning lessons began at 9:30 with a break at 11:30. Lessons would resume for the afternoon at 3:00 and would last until 5:00.

The System was endorsed by Queen Victoria's half-brother, Carl, 3rd Prince of Leiningen, who supported their mother's ambitions for a regency. In 1841, after Victoria had become queen and had made known her displeasure with the system, Carl attempted to justify it in his book A Complete History of the Policy Followed at Kensington, Under Sir John Conroy's Guidance.

== Aftermath ==
Upon her accession to the throne, Queen Victoria demanded an hour to herself, which the System had never permitted. In addition, Victoria had her bed removed from her mother's room. Among Victoria's first acts upon her accession to the throne was to ban Conroy from her apartments permanently.

After a brief engagement, Victoria married Prince Albert in 1840 and thus was no longer conventionally required to live with her mother. At the conclusion of her wedding ceremony, she shook hands with the Duchess and soon evicted her mother from the palace. She rarely visited her mother and remained distant from her until the birth of her first child.
