= Sir John Conroy, 3rd Baronet =

- Born: 16 August 1845; Kensington, London, England
- Died: 15 December 1900 (aged 55); Rome, Kingdom of Italy
- Education: Christ Church, Oxford
- Known for: Optical measurements
- Scientific career
- Fields: Physical chemistry, analytical chemistry
- Workplaces: Balliol College, Oxford
- Doctoral advisor: Augustus George Vernon Harcourt
- Doctoral students: Sir Harold Brewer Hartley

Sir John Conroy, 3rd Baronet, FRS (16 August 1845 – 15 December 1900) was an English analytical chemist.

Conroy was born in Kensington, west London, the son of Sir Edward Conroy, 2nd Baronet (1809–1869) and Lady Alicia Conroy. He was descended from the Ó Maolconaire family of Elphin, County Roscommon. The family had been the hereditary Ollamhs to the O'Conor Kings of Connacht. He was descended from Maoilin Ó Maolchonaire who was the last recognised Chief of the Sept. He was educated at Eton College and then Christ Church, Oxford, also the college of his father, where he read Natural Science, gaining a first class degree in 1868. His tutor was the chemical kinetics pioneer Augustus George Vernon Harcourt FRS.

He lived mostly with his mother at Arborfield Grange in Berkshire until 1880. His scientific interests were in analytical chemistry, especially optical measurements. He worked mainly in a laboratory at Christ Church in Oxford. He had teaching posts at Keble College (1880–90), and Balliol College and Trinity College (1886–1900). He worked at the Balliol-Trinity Laboratories with Sir Harold Hartley and others.

In 1890, he became a Fellow of Balliol College. In 1891, he was elected a Fellow of the Royal Society.

Conroy's religious leanings were High Church and he was involved with the English Church Union. From 1897, he was treasurer of the Radcliffe Infirmary in Oxford.

Conroy never married and died in Rome. His baronetcy became extinct as a result.

Baronetage of the United Kingdom
Preceded by Edward Conroy	Baronet (of Llanbrynmair); 1869–1900	Extinct
