= Duchess Marie of Württemberg =

Duchess of Saxe-Coburg and Gotha from 1832 to 1844

Marie of Württemberg
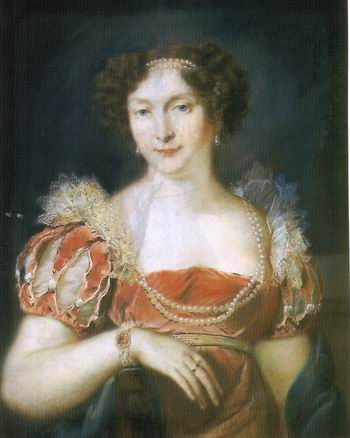
- Pastel portrait around 1850, Schloss Callenberg

Duchess consort of Saxe-Coburg and Gotha
- Tenure: 23 December 1832 – 29 January 1844
- Born: 17 September 1799; Coburg
- Died: 24 September 1860 (aged 61); Schloss Friedenstein, Gotha
- Burial: Friedhof am Glockenberg, Coburg
- Spouse: Ernest I, Duke of Saxe-Coburg and Gotha (m. 1832; died 1844)
Names
- Antoinette Friederike Auguste Marie Anna
- House: Württemberg
- Father: Duke Alexander of Württemberg
- Mother: Princess Antoinette of Saxe-Coburg-Saalfeld
- Religion: Lutheranism

Marie of Württemberg (Antoinette Friederike Auguste Marie Anna Herzogin von Württemberg; 17 September 1799 – 24 September 1860) was a daughter of Duke Alexander of Württemberg and Antoinette of Saxe-Coburg-Saalfeld. She was Duchess of Saxe-Coburg and Gotha from 1832 to 1844 as the second wife of Duke Ernest I. As such, she was the stepmother of Prince Albert, consort of Queen Victoria.

== Early life ==
Marie was born on 17 September 1799, the eldest child of Duke Alexander of Württemberg and his wife Princess Antoinette of Saxe-Coburg-Saalfeld. She had two younger surviving brothers, Duke Alexander and Duke Ernest. The Kingdom of Württemberg, as it was known from 1806 onward, was a prominent entity in Germany on the level of Prussia, Bavaria, and Saxony, with connections to the English and Russian royal families.

Marie was raised at Schloss Fantaisie in Bayreuth. As her father was a general in the Russian army, and later governor of Belarus, Marie lived from 1802 to 1832 at Jelgava (modern day Latvia) and in a St. Petersburg palace.

== Marriage ==
In Coburg on 23 December 1832, Marie became the second wife of her 48-year-old maternal uncle Ernest I, Duke of Saxe-Coburg and Gotha. Ernest had been eager to find a new bride after the death of his first, estranged wife, Louise of Saxe-Gotha-Altenburg. While Ernest initially sought a wife of high status, he found that his age and poor reputation limited his choices. He settled for Marie, who was thirty-three years old and his niece; uncle-niece marriages were by this time becoming discouraged among European royalty.

As a result of this union, Marie became stepmother of Ernest II and Prince Albert, future husband of Queen Victoria of the United Kingdom. Marie was also their first cousin. Ernest and his sons met Marie at Thalwitz Castle and accompanied her to the duchies to begin her marriage. She maintained a happy relationship until death with both of her stepsons, becoming godmother (in absentia) of Victoria and Albert's first son, Albert Edward, Prince of Wales, (King Edward VII) in 1841.

Historian Gillian Gill describes Marie as a "severe and melancholy lady". Marie and Ernest would have no children, and the two quickly grew apart, largely living on separate estates. By 1843 Marie had adopted a child of "humble parentage", though Albert cautioned her to avoid giving it hopeless aspirations to rank. He wrote, "I wish you more success than generally attends the education of poor children of the lower ranks by persons of our own."

While Albert referred to her as "dear mama" in his letters to her, Marie opted not to attend several important events in her stepsons' lives, such as their confirmation and Queen Victoria's coronation (Marie cited inclement weather for the former). Albert and Marie maintained correspondence throughout their lives, which has helped historians gain a better understanding of their relationship.

Marie was interested in literature, music, theatre, and art. The newly built Landestheater Coburg was opened on her 41st birthday. From 1842, Franz Liszt often visited her. In 1836, she assumed the management of the Gothaer Marien-Institut, a private educational institution for girls. On May 3, 1842, she donated 2000 thalers for establishing an refuge for young children in Coburg, modeled on a similar institute in the capital, Gotha. The "Marienschulstiftung" (Marie School Foundation) began operation that same year and has run a Kindergarten since, later also a "Kinderkrippe" (for smaller children), as an independent foundation. The institution has been housed since 1869 in a building that Marie owned, "Park 1", in Coburg.

== Widowhood ==
Ernest I died in 1844, and the dowager duchess chose as her dower residence Schloss Reinhardsbrunn, Schloss Friedrichsthal, and Schloss Friedenstein, all in Gotha. She opted to return to Coburg mainly to meet with her visiting English relatives. Marie died at Schloss Friedenstein on 24 September 1860, the year before Albert's death. She is buried in the ducal mausoleum of the Friedhof am Glockenberg in Coburg.

== Ancestry ==
Ancestors of Duchess Marie of Württemberg

8. Charles Alexander, Duke of Württemberg
4. Frederick II Eugene, Duke of Württemberg
9. Princess Marie Auguste of Thurn and Taxis
2. Duke Alexander of Württemberg
10. Frederick William, Margrave of Brandenburg-Schwedt
5. Princess Friederike of Brandenburg-Schwedt
11. Princess Sophia Dorothea of Prussia
1. Duchess Marie of Württemberg
12. Ernest Frederick, Duke of Saxe-Coburg-Saalfeld
6. Francis, Duke of Saxe-Coburg-Saalfeld
13. Princess Sophie Antoinette of Brunswick-Wolfenbüttel
3. Princess Antoinette of Saxe-Coburg-Saalfeld
14. Heinrich XXIV, Count Reuss of Ebersdorf
7. Countess Augusta Reuss of Ebersdorf
15. Countess Karoline Ernestine of Erbach-Schönberg

Duchess Marie of Württemberg House of Württemberg Born: 17 September 1799 Died: 24 September 1860
German royalty
Preceded by Louise of Saxe-Gotha-Altenburg as Duchess of Saxe-Coburg-Saalfeld	Duchess consort of Saxe-Coburg and Gotha; 23 December 1832–29 January 1844	Succeeded by Alexandrine of Baden
