= Duke Alexander of Württemberg =

Duke Alexander of Württemberg may refer to:

- Duke Alexander of Württemberg (1771–1833), son of Frederick II Eugene, Duke of Württemberg, founder of the fifth branch of the House of Württemberg
- Duke Alexander of Württemberg (1804–1881), son of Duke Alexander of Württemberg (1771–1833), first cousin to Queen Victoria
- Duke Alexander of Württemberg (1804–1885), of the second branch of the House of Württemberg, father of Francis, Duke of Teck and the grandfather of Mary of Teck
