= Walter von Keudell =

German politician (1884–1973)

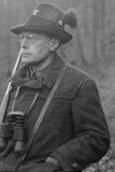
- Keudell in 1934

Reich Minister of the Interior
- In office 31 January 1927 – 12 June 1928
- Chancellor: Wilhelm Marx
- Preceded by: Wilhelm Külz
- Succeeded by: Carl Severing

Member of the Reichstag
- In office 27 May 1924 – 18 July 1930
- Constituency: Frankfurt (Oder)

Personal details
- Born: 17 July 1884 Castellamare di Stabia, Naples, Kingdom of Italy
- Died: 7 May 1973 (aged 88) Bonn, West Germany
- Party: Christian Democratic Union of Germany (1948-1973)
- Other political affiliations: German National People's Party; Christian-National Peasants' and Farmers' Party; Nazi Party

Walter von Keudell (17 July 1884 – 7 May 1973) was a German forest expert and politician. He served as interior minister of Germany between 1927 and 1928 during the period of the Weimar Republic.

== Early life ==
Von Keudell was born in Castellamare di Stabia, Naples, Italy, on 17 July 1884. He was the oldest son of Robert von Keudell, German diplomat and a member of the Reichstag. His mother was Alexandra von Grünhof. Daughter of Ernest of Wurttemberg. Which made Walter a Great grandson of Alexander of Wurttemberg. He also had a brother, Otto von Keudell, and a sister, Hedwig von Keudell.

== Career ==
Von Keudell started his career in the forest administration in Frankfurt/Oder in 1908. From 1915 he worked at the Reichsgetreidestelle (Reich grain administration). From 1916 to 1920 von Keudell was the Landrat (district administrator) at Königsberg (Neumark) (today, Chojna). As a result of the failed Kapp Putsch, which he supported, von Keudell had to retire and worked as a farmer at Gut Hohenlübbichow.

However, he returned to politics and was elected as a member of the Reichstag for the German National People's Party (DNVP) from 1924 to 1930 (after 1929, the Christian-National Peasants' and Farmers' Party).

On 31 January 1927 von Keudell was appointed Reichsinnenminister (minister of the interior) and vice chancellor in the fourth cabinet of chancellor Wilhelm Marx. He was one of three nationalist cabinet members. The cabinet resigned on 12 June 1928 and Carl Severing replaced von Keudell as interior minister on 29 June 1928 when the new government headed by Hermann Müller took office.

Shortly after the Nazi seizure of power, von Keudell joined the Nazi Party on 1 March 1933, and on 8 August he was appointed Prussian Oberlandforstmeister and head of the Prussian Landesforstverwaltung (State Forest Administration) in Brandenburg.

On 3 July 1934, Reichsforstmeister Hermann Göring appointed von Keudell as Generalforstmeister in the newly established Reichsforstamt (Reich Forestry Office) and, on 1 March 1935, appointed him to the Prussian State Council. On 1 May 1936, Göring promoted him to Staatssekretär (State Secretary) and made him his permanent deputy (ständiger Vertreter des Reichsforstmeisters). In 1937 von Keudell also became a member of the Reichsverkehrsrat (Reich transportation council). Von Keudell was removed from office on 1 November 1937 (im einstweiligen Ruhestand) when he refused to implement the forest policy of Göring which advocated the use of the mandatory cutting quota in private forests as in public forests. Friedrich Alpers succeeded von Keudell in the post.

In 1948, von Keudell joined the Christian Democratic Union.

== Personal life and death ==
Walter von Keudell was a devout Protestant. He married Johanna von Kyaw on 6 February 1912. They had four children. He died in Bonn on 7 May 1973.
