= Princess Antoinette of Saxe-Coburg-Saalfeld =

German princess (1779–1824)

- Duchess Alexander of Württemberg
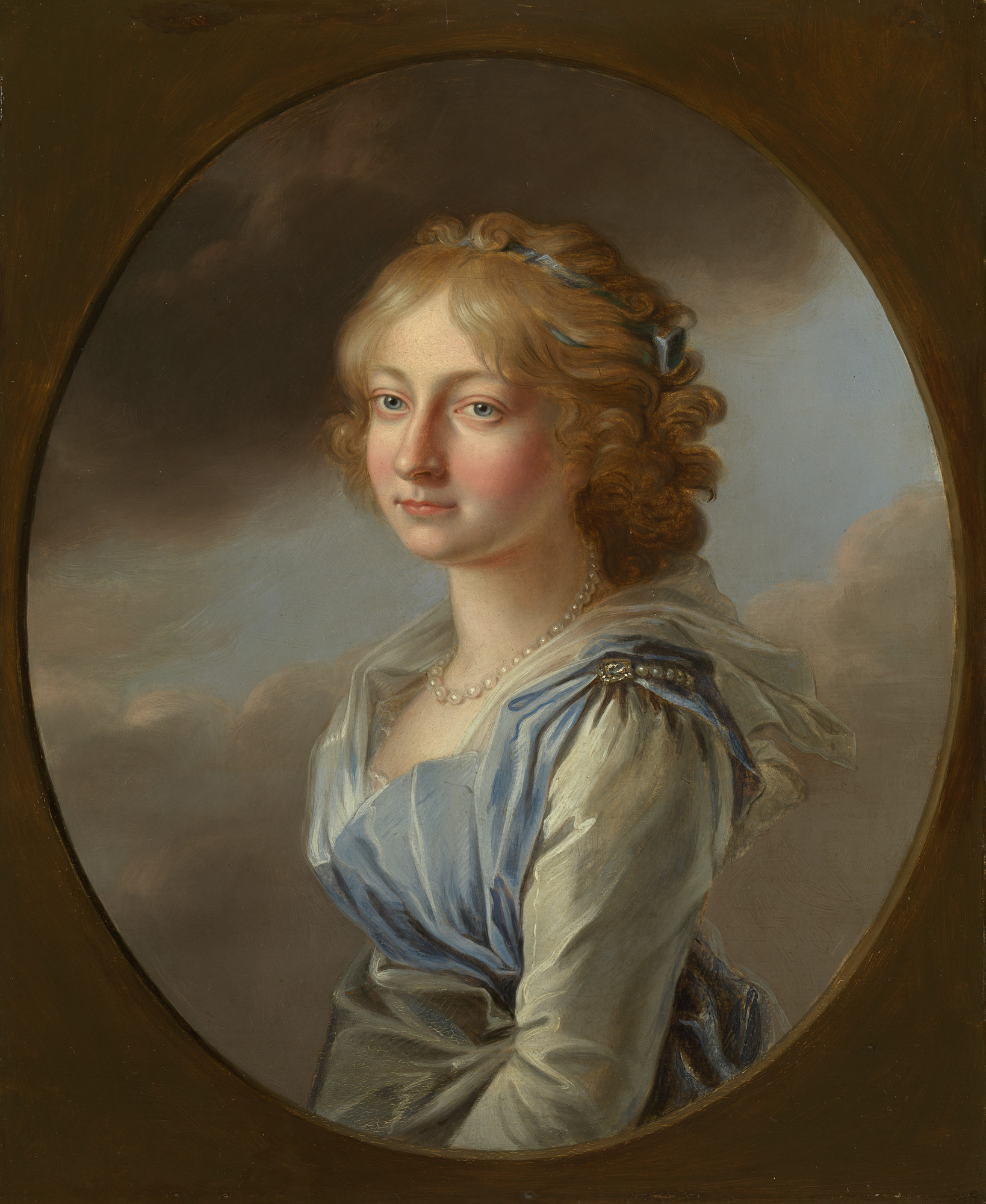
- Antoinette c. 1795
- Born: 28 August 1779; Coburg, Saxe-Coburg-Saalfeld
- Died: 14 March 1824 (aged 44); Saint Petersburg, Russian Empire
- Spouse: Duke Alexander of Württemberg (m. 1798)
- Issue: Marie, Duchess of Saxe-Coburg and Gotha; Duke Paul; Alexander, Duke of Württemberg; Ernest of Württemberg; Duke Frederick
Names
- Antoinette Ernestine Amalie
- House: Saxe-Coburg-Saalfeld
- Father: Francis, Duke of Saxe-Coburg-Saalfeld
- Mother: Countess Augusta Reuss of Ebersdorf

Princess Antoinette Ernestine Amalie of Saxe-Coburg-Saalfeld (28 August 1779 – 14 March 1824) was a German princess of the House of Wettin. By marriage, she was a Duchess of Württemberg. Through her eldest surviving son, she is the ancestress of today's (Catholic) House of Württemberg.

Born in Coburg, Antoinette was the second daughter of Francis, Duke of Saxe-Coburg-Saalfeld by his second wife, Countess Augusta Reuss of Ebersdorf. She was also the elder sister of King Leopold I of Belgium and the aunt of both Queen Victoria and her husband, Prince Albert. Her maternal grandparents were Heinrich XXIV, Count Reuss of Ebersdorf, and Countess Karoline Ernestine of Erbach-Schönberg, and her paternal grandparents were Ernest Frederick, Duke of Saxe-Coburg-Saalfeld, and Duchess Sophie Antoinette of Brunswick-Wolfenbüttel.

== Life ==
In Coburg on 17 November 1798, she married Alexander of Württemberg. The couple settled in Russia, where Alexander, as a maternal uncle of both Emperors Alexander I and Nicholas I made a military and diplomatic career.

Antoinette was regarded as influential, and was bearer of the Grand Cross of the Imperial Russian Order of Saint Catherine.

Antoinette died in St. Petersburg. She was buried in the Ducal crypt of Schloss Friedenstein in Gotha, where her husband and sons Paul and Frederick found their final resting place.

According to Queen Louise of Prussia, Antoinette could have had an illegitimate child. She wrote to her brother George on 18 May 1802: "The Württemberg couple didn't speak to each other in 2 years, but she has a child and certainly the father was some Herr von Höbel, a Canon. I know all this from the Duke of Weimar, and is holy true."

== Issue ==
- Duchess Marie of Württemberg (17 September 1799 – 24 September 1860). She remained unmarried until the age of 33 when, on 23 December 1832, she married her uncle, Ernest I, Duke of Saxe-Coburg and Gotha, becoming the stepmother of Prince Albert.
- Duke Paul Karl Alexander Konstantin of Württemberg (1800–1801) died in infancy at the age of one.
- Duke Alexander of Württemberg (20 December 1804 – 28 October 1881) he married Princess Marie d'Orléans on 17 October 1837. They had one son.
- Duke Ernest of Württemberg (11 August 1807 – 26 October 1868) he married Natalie Eschborn on 21 August 1860. They had one daughter:
  - Alexandra von Grünhof (10 August 1861 – 13 April 1933) she married Robert von Keudell on 15 September 1883. They had three children:
    - Walter von Keudell (17 July 1884 – 7 May 1973) he married Johanna von Kyaw on 6 February 1912. They had four children.
    - Otto von Keudell (9 February 1887 – 12 May 1972) he married Maria Momm (15 July 1895 – 17 April 1945) on 14 August 1920. They have seven children. He remarried Edelgarde von Stülpnagel on 5 September 1947. They have four children.
    - Hedwig von Keudell (13 April 1891 – 11 October 1987) she married Karl von der Trenck on 17 July 1918. They had five children.
- Duke Frederick Wilhelm Ferdinand of Württemberg (29 April 1810 – 25 April 1815) died at the age of four years old.

== Ancestry ==
Ancestors of Princess Antoinette of Saxe-Coburg-Saalfeld

16. John Ernest IV, Duke of Saxe-Coburg-Saalfeld
8. Francis Josias, Duke of Saxe-Coburg-Saalfeld
17. Countess Charlotte Johanna of Waldeck-Wildungen
4. Ernest Frederick, Duke of Saxe-Coburg-Saalfeld
18. Louis Frederick I, Prince of Schwarzburg-Rudolstadt
9. Princess Anna Sophia of Schwarzburg-Rudolstadt
19. Anna Sophie of Saxe-Gotha-Altenburg
2. Francis, Duke of Saxe-Coburg-Saalfeld
20. Ferdinand Albert I, Duke of Brunswick-Lüneburg
10. Ferdinand Albert II, Duke of Brunswick-Wolfenbüttel
21. Christine of Hesse-Eschwege
5. Princess Sophie Antoinette of Brunswick-Wolfenbüttel
22. Louis Rudolph, Duke of Brunswick-Lüneburg
11. Princess Antoinette of Brunswick-Wolfenbüttel
23. Princess Christine Louise of Oettingen-Oettingen
1. Princess Antoinette of Saxe-Coburg-Saalfeld
24. Heinrich X, Count Reuss of Ebersdorf
12. Heinrich XXIX, Count Reuss of Ebersdorf
25. Countess Erdmuthe Benigna of Solms-Laubach
6. Heinrich XXIV, Count Reuss of Ebersdorf
26. Wolfgang Dietrich of Castell-Remlingen
13. Sophie Theodora of Castell-Remlingen
27. Countess Dorothea Renate of Zinzendorf and Pottendorf
3. Countess Augusta Reuss of Ebersdorf
28. George Albert II, Count of Erbach-Fürstenau
14. George August, Count of Erbach-Schönberg
29. Countess Anna Dorothea Christine of Hohenlohe-Waldenburg
7. Countess Karoline Ernestine of Erbach-Schönberg
30. Ludwig Christian, Count of Stolberg-Gedern
15. Countess Ferdinande Henriette of Stolberg-Gedern
31. Duchess Christine of Mecklenburg-Güstrow

== Bibliography ==
- von Wiebeking, Carl Friedrich. Biographie des Herzogs Alexander zu Württemberg. Munich, 1835.
- Sauer, Paul. "Alexander (I.)." In Das Haus Württemberg. Ein biographisches Lexikon, ed. Sönke Lorenz, Dieter Mertens, and Volker Press. Stuttgart: Kohlhammer Verlag, 1997. ISBN 3-17-013605-4
