= Princess Marie of Orléans (1813–1839) =

French princess; second daughter of Louis Philippe I

- Duchess Alexander of Württemberg
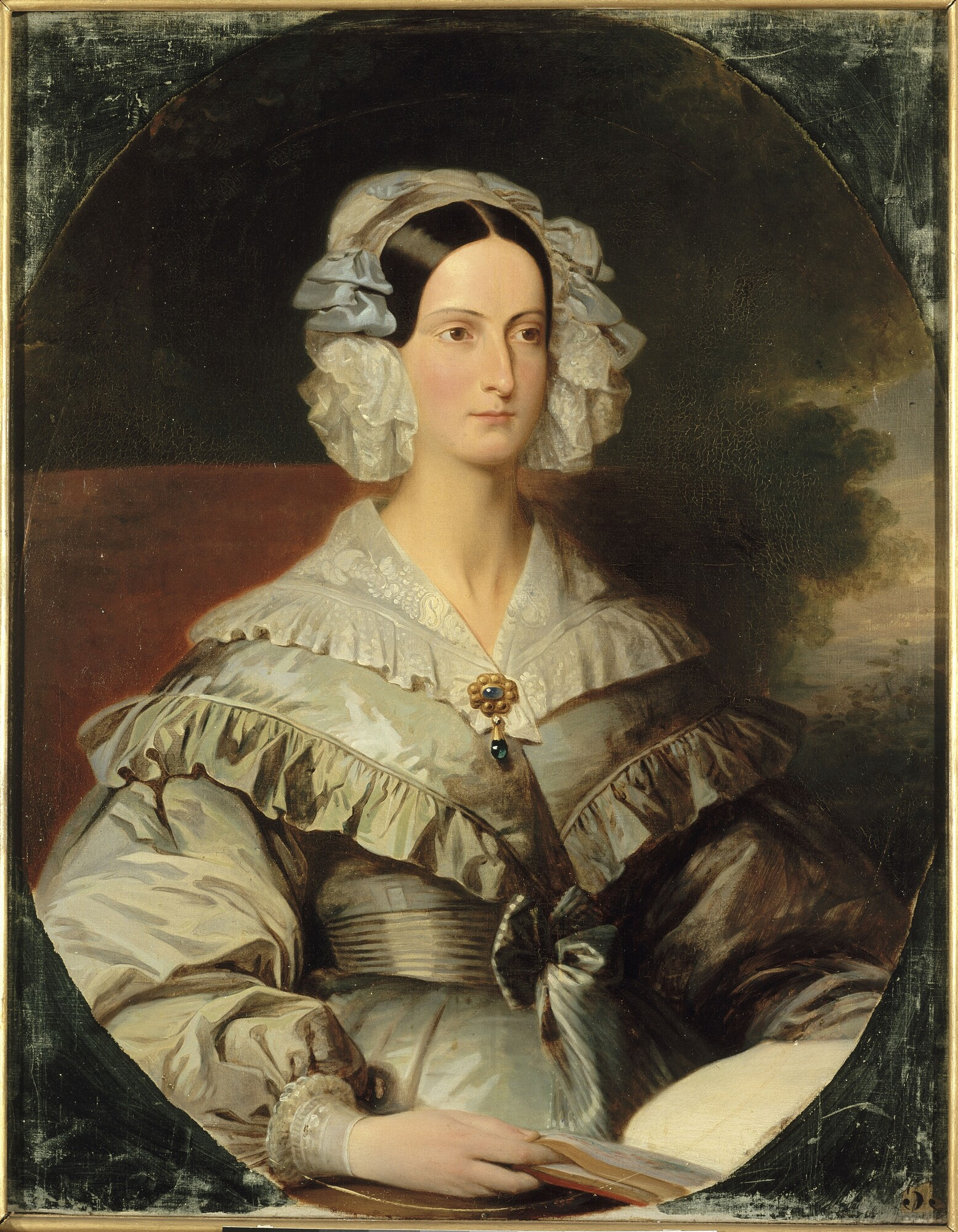
- 1839 portrait
- Born: 12 April 1813; Palermo, Sicily
- Died: 6 January 1839 (aged 25); Pisa, Tuscany
- Burial: 27 January 1839; Chapelle royale de Dreux
- Spouse: Duke Alexander of Württemberg (m. 1837)
- Issue: Duke Philipp
Names
- Marie Christine Caroline Adélaïde Françoise Léopoldine d'Orléans
- House: Orléans
- Father: Louis Philippe I
- Mother: Maria Amalia of the Two Sicilies

Princess Marie of Orléans (12 April 1813 – 6 January 1839) was a French princess, artist, and, by her marriage, duchess of Württemberg (1837). Before her marriage, she was styled Mademoiselle de Valois.

== Biography ==
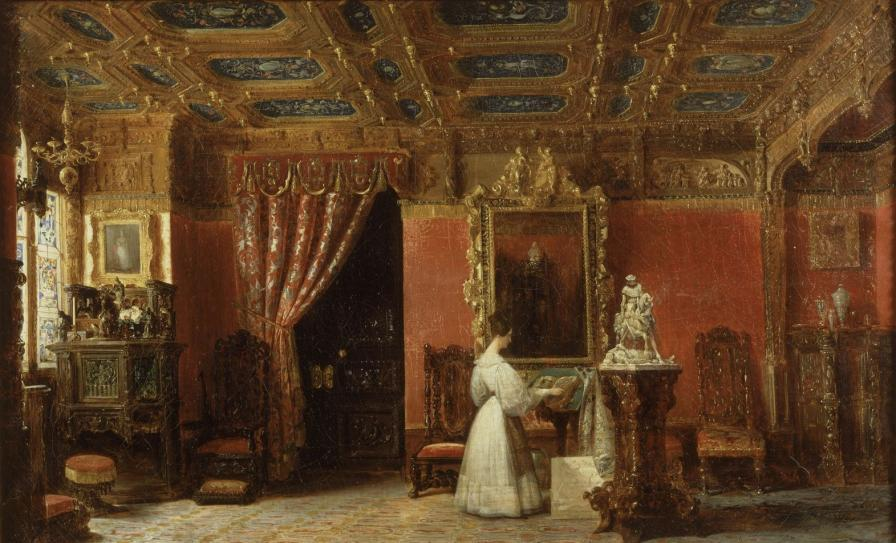
Princess Marie in her studio in the Tuileries Palace (by Prosper Lafaye, c. 1842)

She was the third child (and second daughter) of Louis-Philippe, King of the French (Duke of Orléans until 1830), and his wife Maria Amalia, daughter of King Ferdinand IV of Naples and Sicily. She was solidly educated on her father's insistence, and took up sculpture and drawing. She had her own studio installed in the Tuileries Palace in which she would work. She was described as a lively character with great energy, interested in both parties and politics.

At the beginning of 1834, due to the consolidation of the July Monarchy and a better acceptance of Louis-Philippe by the monarchs of Europe, the King of the Two Sicilies, Ferdinand II, gave his consent to the marriage of princess Marie of Orléans with one of his younger brothers. Leopold of the Two Sicilies, count of Syracuse, was (like Ferdinand) born of king Francis I's second marriage to Maria Isabella of Spain. Nephew of Maria's mother (queen Maria Amalia), he was thus also half-brother to the duchesse de Berry, born by Francis I's first marriage to archduchess Maria Clementina of Austria, and mother of the Legitimist pretender to the throne of France, the duc de Bordeaux.

However, following the uprisings which afflicted France in April 1834, the court of Naples demanded that Marie immediately receive the part of the Orléans family fortune which was due to her by the "donation-partage" Louis-Philippe had made among his children on 7 August 1830 on the eve on his accession to the throne. Louis-Philippe judged this demand unreasonable, and the marriage proceedings came to an end.

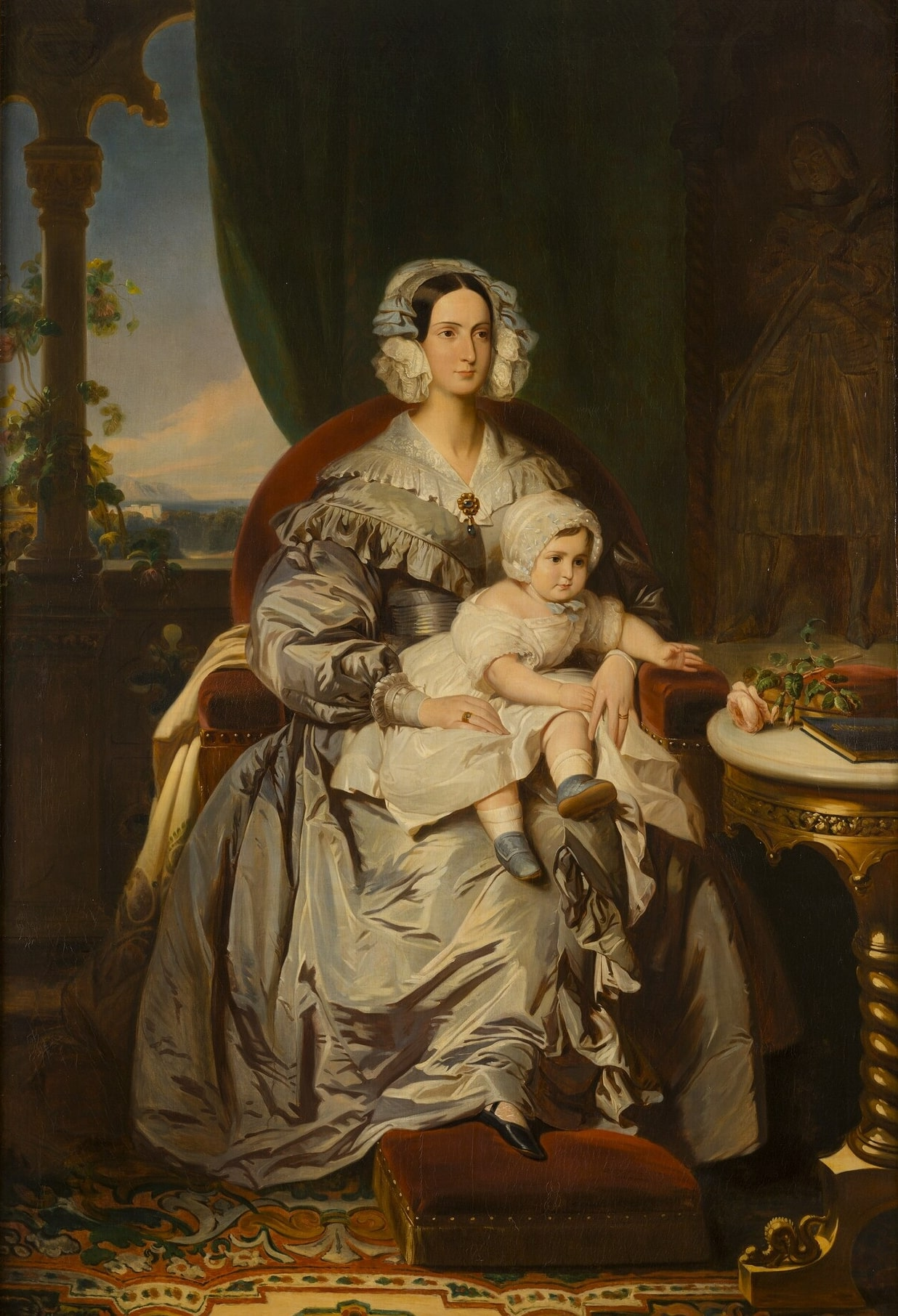
Duchess Alexander of Württemberg and her son, Duke Philipp, by Franz Xaver Winterhalter, 1838

On 17 October 1837, Marie d'Orléans married Prince Alexander of Württemberg, son of Duke Alexander of Württemberg and his wife Antoinette of Saxe-Coburg-Saalfeld. A member of the cadet branch of a not very prestigious German princely family, Alexander was nevertheless the nephew both of King Frederick I of Württemberg (via his father) and of King Leopold I of Belgium (via his mother). He was also a first cousin of both British Queen Victoria and her husband, Prince Albert as well as Portuguese King Ferdinand II and Russian Emperors Alexander I and Nicholas I. The ceremony took place on 18 October 1837 at the Grand Trianon in Versailles, restored by Louis-Philippe for his personal use. The civil ceremony was taken by chancelier Pasquier, the Catholic ceremony by Louis-Marie-Edmond Blanquart de Bailleul, bishop of Versailles, and the Lutheran ceremony by pastor Cuvier. The following reception took days and was hosted by the king and queen.

They had one child, Duke Philipp of Württemberg, who inherited his father's dukedom and in 1865 married Archduchess Marie-Therese of Austria (1845–1927), daughter of Archduke Albert, Duke of Teschen. They are the ancestors of the present claimants to the throne of Württemberg.

In 1838, weakened by pulmonary tuberculosis, Marie left for Pisa with the hope that the more favourable climate would help her to a cure. Her brother Louis, Duke of Nemours, was later sent to escort her on their parents' instructions and arrived just before her death on 6 January 1839. She was buried on 27 January at the royal chapel at Dreux. Allegedly, her last words, addessed to her brother Nemours, were: "Tell Mamma how much I love her, and that I am glad she is not here to be grieved by my sufferings."

== Artist ==
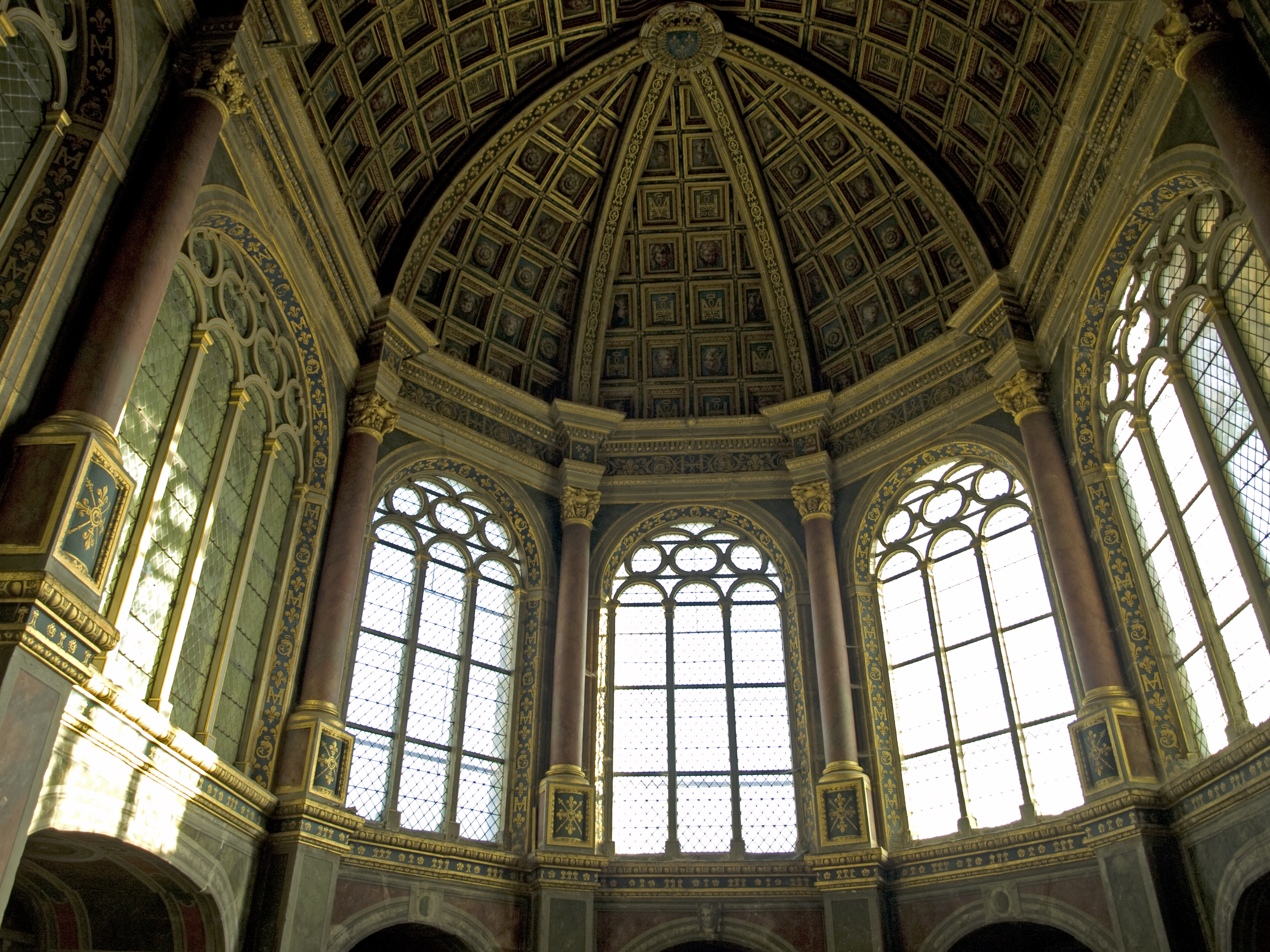
Windows of St. Saturnin's Chapel in the Palace of Fontainebleau

A student of Ary Scheffer, she was a talented artist, practicing sculpture and drawing. Toward the end of her short career, d'Orléans focused herself on sculpting images of Joan of Arc, completing many works depicting this patriotic subject including a large sculpture for Versailles, commissioned by King Louis-Philipe.

According to her teacher, Ary Scheffer, she "dreamed of an elevated life as an artist, and of exercising a profound influence over the art in France." Many of her works survive, in collections at the Clark Art Institute, Snite Museum of Art, and the Museum of Dordrecht.

In particular, she designed the windows in St. Saturnin's Chapel of the Palace of Fontainebleau, which were made by Émile Wattier.

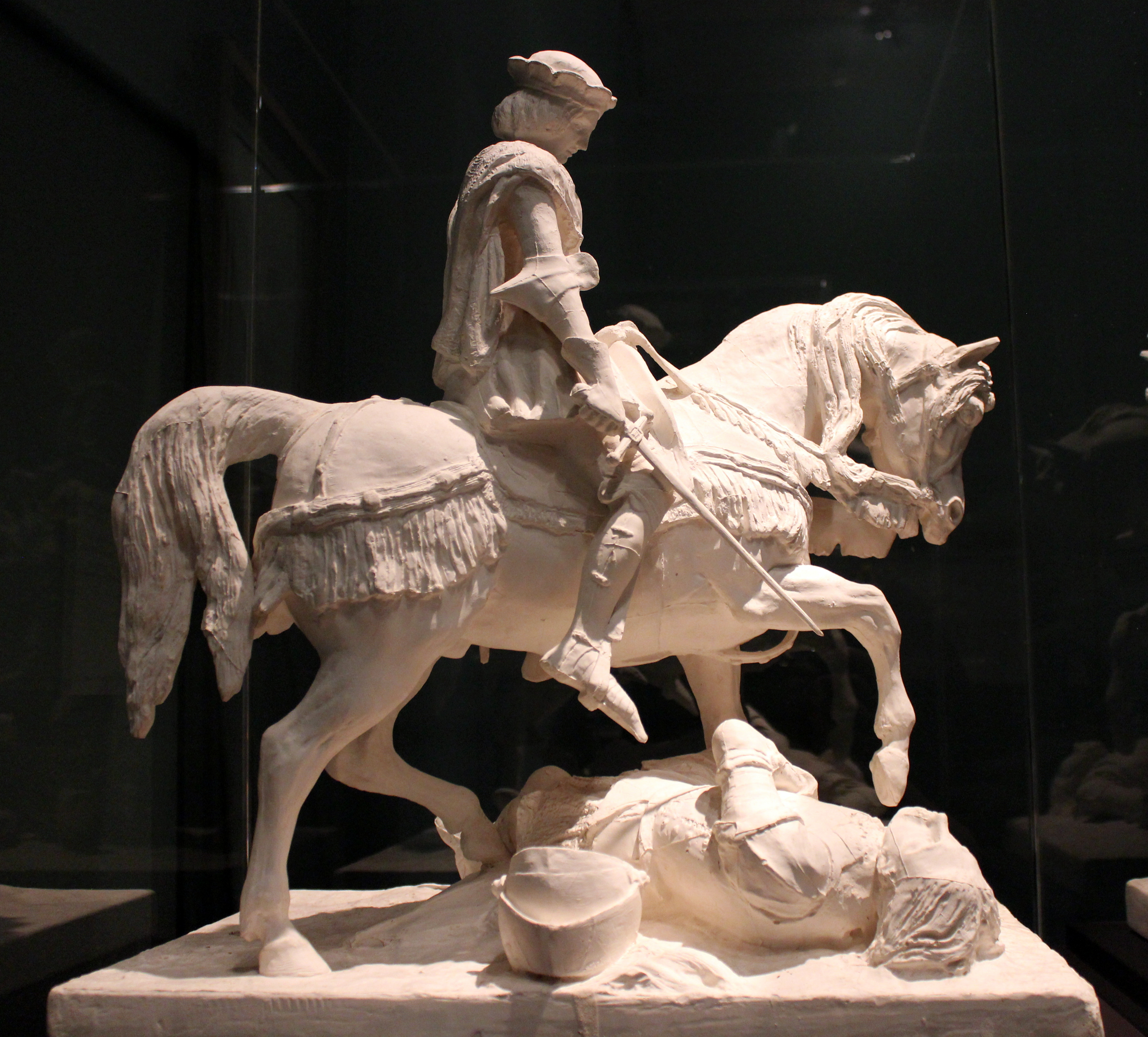
Jeanne d’Arc pleurant à la vue d’un Anglais blessé, 1834, Museum of Grenoble
