= Grand Trianon =

Coordinates: 48°48′53″N 2°06′17″E

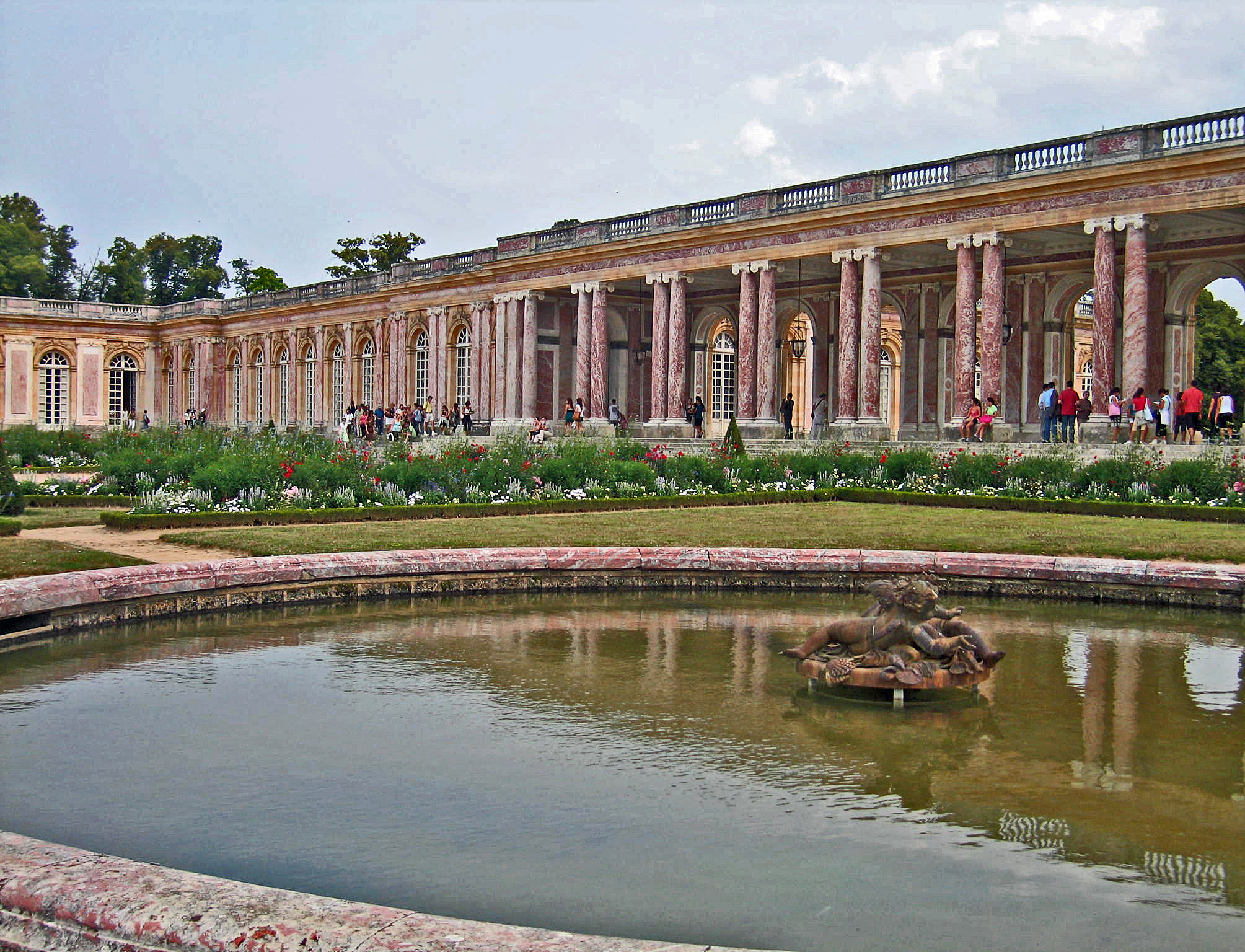
- Interactive map of the Grand Trianon area
- Alternative names: Trianon de Marbre

General information
- Type: Château
- Architectural style: French Baroque, Louis XIV style, Neoclassical and Empire Style
- Location: Versailles, France
- Construction started: 1687
- Completed: 1688
- Renovated: 1963
- Client: Louis XIV

Technical details
- Material: Red marble

Design and construction
- Architect: Jules Hardouin-Mansart

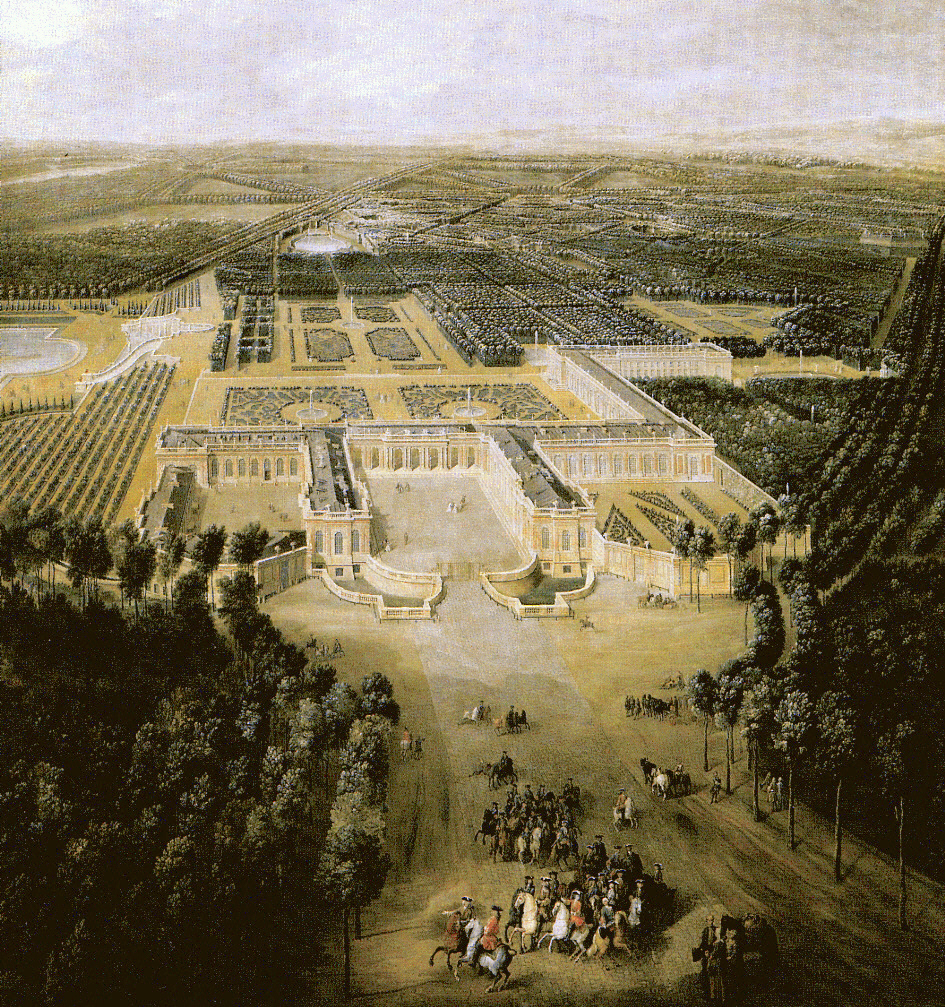
The Grand Trianon in 1724

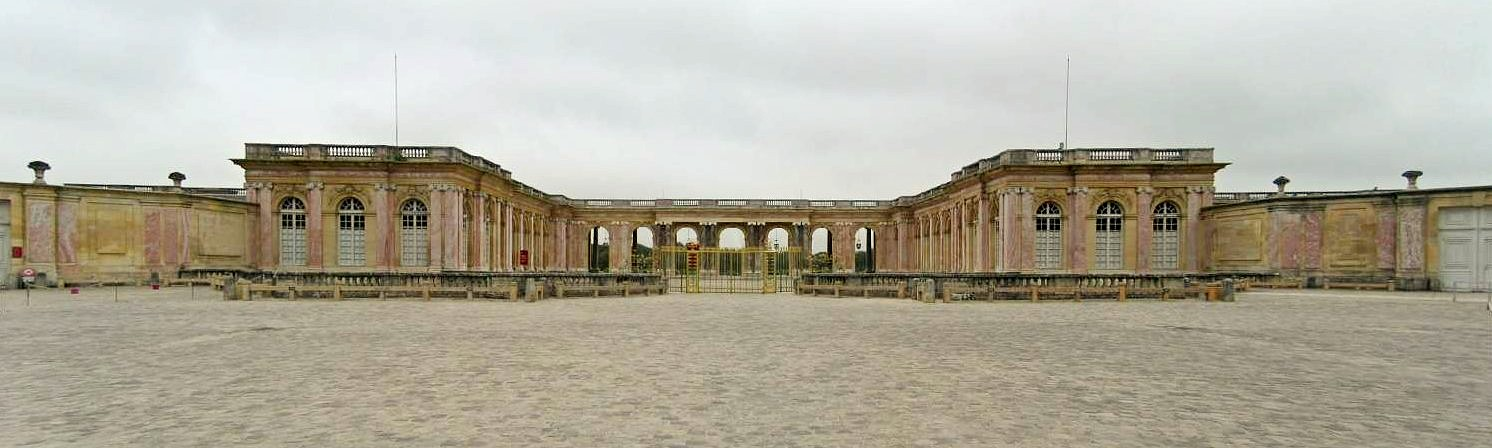
The Grand Trianon in 2009

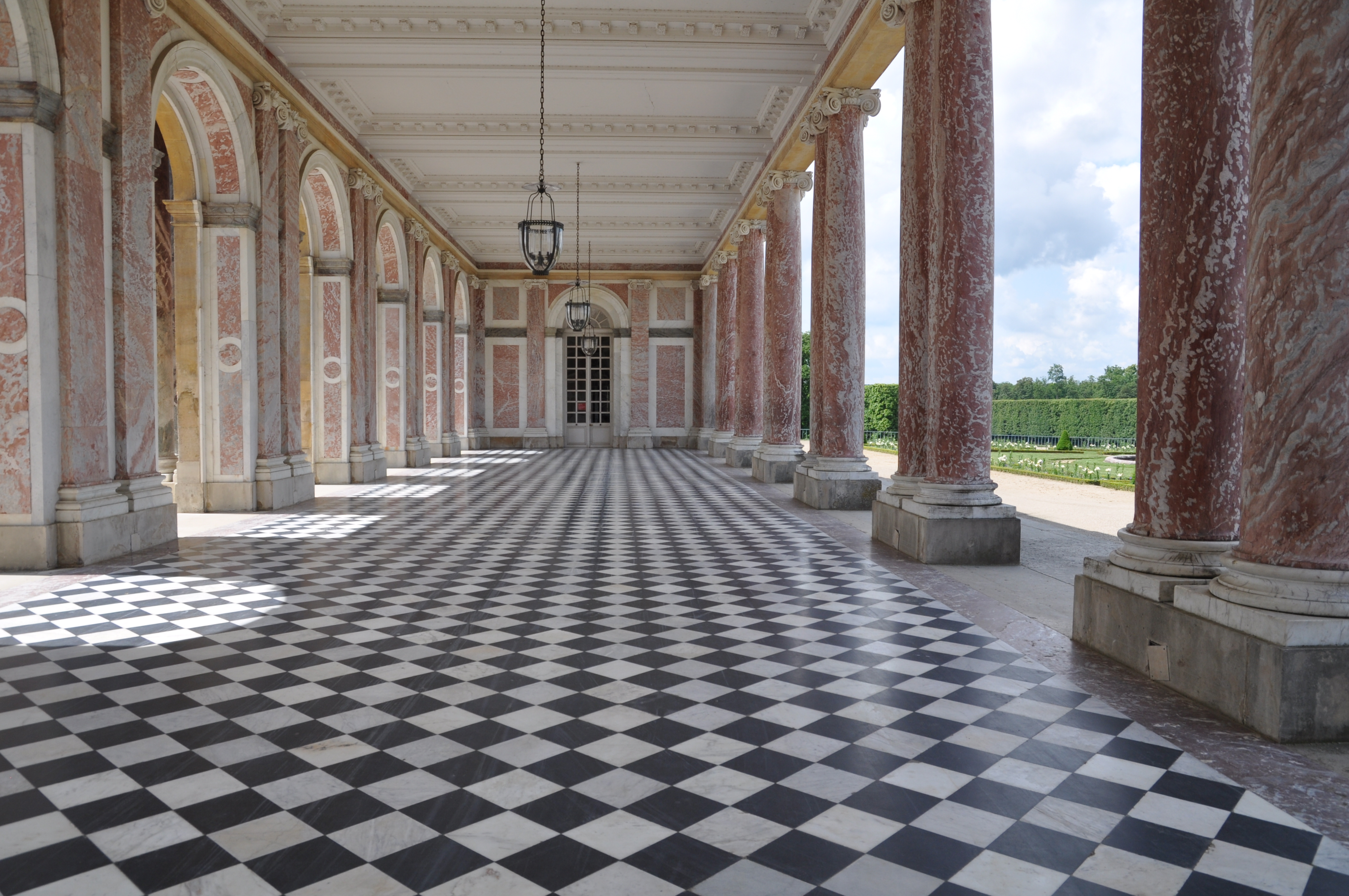
Peristyle of the Grand Trianon

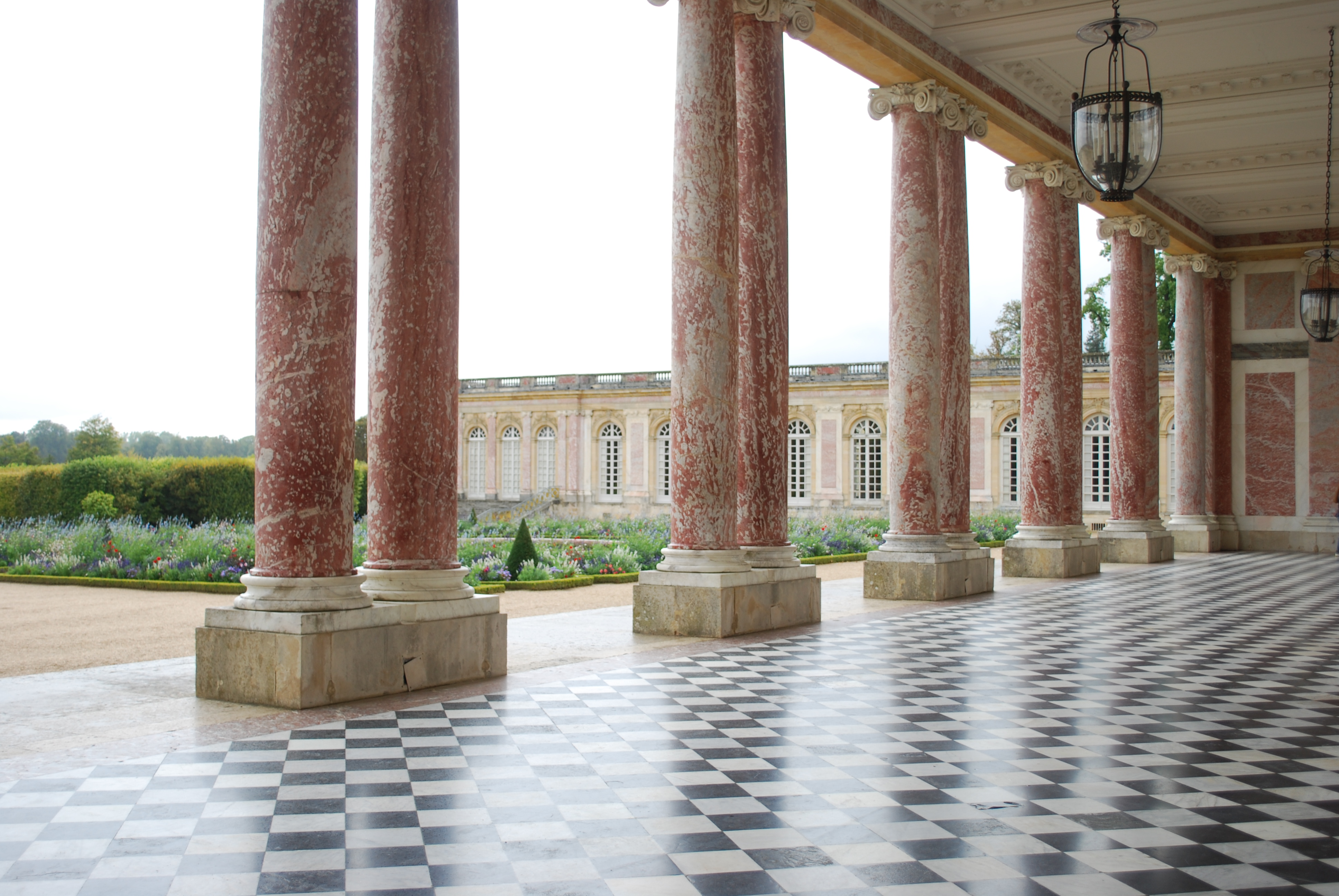
The Grand Trianon in summer

The Grand Trianon (French pronunciation: [ɡʁɑ̃ tʁijanɔ̃]) is a French Baroque style château situated in the northwestern part of the Domain of Versailles in Versailles, France. It was built at the request of Louis XIV as a retreat for himself and his erstwhile maîtresse-en-titre, Madame de Montespan, and as a place where he and invited guests could take light meals (collations) away from the strict etiquette of the royal court. The Grand Trianon is set within its own park, which includes the Petit Trianon (a smaller château built in the 1760s, during the reign of Louis XV).

== Trianon de Porcelaine ==
Between 1663 and 1665, Louis XIV purchased the hamlet of Trianon, on the outskirts of Versailles. In 1670, he commissioned the architect Louis Le Vau to design a porcelain pavilion (Trianon de Porcelaine) to be built there.

The façade was made of white and blue Delft-style porcelain (ceramic) tiles from the French manufactures of Rouen, Lisieux, Nevers and Saint-Cloud. Construction began in 1670 and was finished two years later. Since it was made of porcelain, the building suffered from deterioration. Louis XIV ordered its demolition in 1686 and replaced it with a larger building.

== Trianon de Marbre ==
=== Under Louis XIV ===
By 1686, the fragile porcelain tiles of the Trianon de Porcelaine had deteriorated to such a point that Louis XIV ordered the demolition of the pavilion and its replacement with one made of stronger material. Commission of the work was entrusted to the architect Jules Hardouin-Mansart. Hardouin-Mansart's new structure was twice the size of the porcelain pavilion, and the material used was red marble from Languedoc.

Begun in June 1687, the new construction (as it is seen today) was finished in January 1688. It was inaugurated by Louis XIV and his mistress, Madame de Maintenon, during the summer of 1688.

Hardouin-Mansart's early plans for the building were substantially altered during construction, with the original intention of keeping the core of the Trianon de Porcelaine intact vetoed in favor of an open-air peristyle with a screen of red marble columns facing onto the garden. At least three other structures were built at the center of the new building and then torn down before the peristyle was settled on, during the frantic building activity of the summer of 1687. The sloping Mansard roof of the original design, meant to harmonize with the roof of the Trianon de Porcelaine, was vetoed by the king, who felt it looked too "heavy" on the structure. The long interior gallery which forks west from the main wing was built on the spot of a favorite outdoor promenade that Louis XIV enjoyed at the old Trianon de Porcelaine.

The interior design scheme departed significantly from what Louis XIV and his architects had established at the Palace of Versailles. Louis reputedly ordered the architects to "Paint everything white. No gilt or color for the walls of Trianon." This was a departure from the variegated marbles, rich colors, and gilding which defined the interiors at Versailles. Instead of the heavy ornamentation on display in the palace, the walls of the Trianon were covered in delicately carved wood boiseries, with plaster friezes, pilasters, and capitals of noticeably more refined, delicate appearance.

The Trianon was home to Louis XIV's extended family, housing his son and heir Louis, Grand Dauphin from 1703 to 1711. The domain was also a favourite retreat of the Duchess of Burgundy, the wife of his grandson Louis de France, the parents of Louis XV. In the later years of Louis XIV's reign, the Trianon was the residence of the King's sister-in-law Elizabeth Charlotte of the Palatinate, Dowager Duchess of Orléans and known at court as Madame. Her son, Philippe d'Orléans, future son-in-law of Louis XIV and Regent of France, lived there with his mother. Louis XIV even ordered the construction of a larger wing for the Trianon, which was begun in 1708 by Hardouin-Mansart; this wing, called Trianon-sous-Bois, housed the Orléans family, including Louis XIV's legitimised daughter Françoise-Marie de Bourbon.

The king's youngest grandson, Charles de France, and his wife Marie Louise Élisabeth d'Orléans also resided there. The Orléans family, who had apartments at the Palace of Versailles, were later replaced by Françoise-Marie's sister; the Duchess of Bourbon, Madame la Duchesse, lived at the Trianon and later built the Palais Bourbon in Paris, the design of which copied the Trianon.

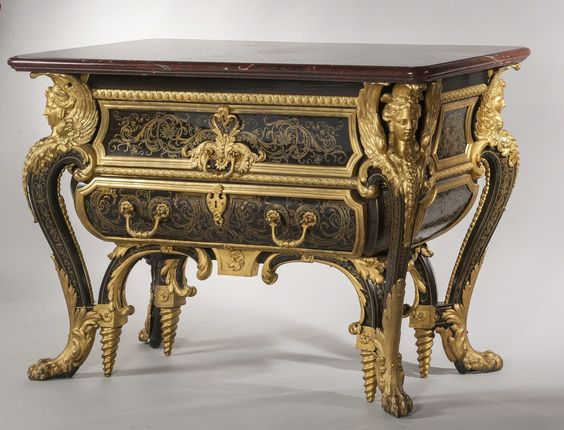
André-Charles Boulle, commode Mazarine (Mazarine cabinet), 1708, made for the Grand Trianon

In 1708, the prototypes for the commodes Mazarine, then called bureaux, were delivered to the Trianon by André-Charles Boulle. The first Duke of Antin, Louis Antoine de Pardaillan de Gondrin, director of the Bâtiments du Roi, wrote to Louis XIV: "I was at the Trianon inspecting the second writing desk by Boulle; it is as beautiful as the other and suits the room perfectly."

In 1717, Peter the Great of Russia, who was studying the palace and gardens of Versailles, resided at the Trianon; the Peterhof Palace was inspired by Versailles.

=== Louis XV and after ===
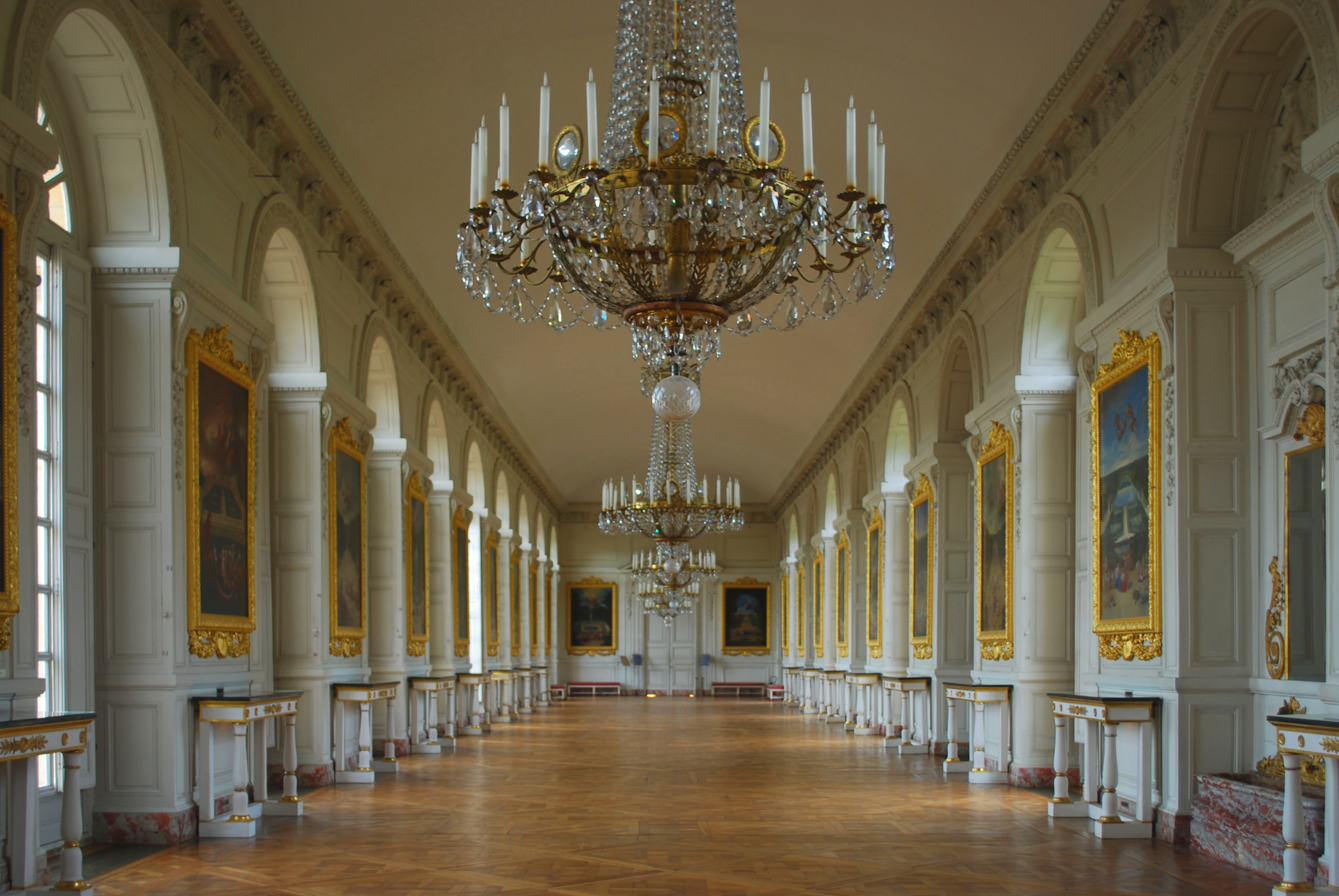
The Grand Trianon's interior

Louis XV did not bring any changes to the Grand Trianon. In 1740 and 1743, his father-in-law, Stanisław Leszczyński, former king of Poland, stayed there during his visits to Versailles. In 1741, Louis XV gifted the Grand Trianon to his wife Marie Leszczyńska. Later, it was during a stay at Trianon that Louis XV fell ill before being transported to the Palace of Versailles, where he died on 10 May 1774.

No more than his predecessor had, Louis XVI brought no structural modifications to the Grand Trianon. His wife, Queen Marie Antoinette, who preferred the Petit Trianon, gave a few theatrical representations in the galerie des Cotelle, a gallery with paintings by Jean l'Aîné Cotelle representing the bosquets of Versailles and Trianon.

During the French Revolution of 1789, the Grand Trianon was left to neglect. At the time of the First French Empire, Napoleon made it one of his residences, and he furnished it in the Empire Style. Napoleon lived at Trianon with his second wife, Marie Louise of Austria. The next royals to live at the Grand Trianon were the King and Queen of the French – Louis Philippe I and his Italian wife Maria Amalia of the Two Sicilies. He was a descendant of the Regent Philippe d'Orléans, and she was a niece of Marie Antoinette. In October 1837, Marie d'Orléans (daughter of Louis Philippe I) married Alexander of Württemberg at the Grand Trianon. Louis Philippe made sanitary alterations to the Grand Trianon, moving the kitchens and offices to the basement and adding plumbing. Despite these changes "the general character of the palace was unchanged, and even the original arrangement of the rooms was preserved," according to Pierre de Nolhac.

In 1873, Marshal François Achille Bazaine was imprisoned for treason at the Grand Trianon and his trial took place in the peristyle.

In 1920, the Grand Trianon hosted the negotiations and signing of the Treaty of Trianon, which left Hungary with less than one-third of its pre-World War I land size. To Hungarians, the word "Trianon" remains to this day the symbol of one of their worst national disasters.

In 1963, Charles de Gaulle ordered a renovation of the building.

A popular site today for tourists visiting Versailles, it is also one of the French Republic's presidential residences used to host foreign officials.

== List of residents ==
- 1690–1703: Louis XIV
- 1703–1711: Louis, Grand Dauphin, son of Louis XIV
  - From 1708: Elizabeth Charlotte of the Palatinate in the Trianon-sous-Bois wing
- 1711–1712: The Duke and Duchess of Burgundy, son of the above and his wife
- 1712–1714: The Duke and Duchess of Berry, brother of the above
- 1717: Peter the Great, Emperor of Russia and his entourage
- c. 1720: Madame la Duchesse, daughter of Louis XIV and Madame de Montespan
- 1740 and 1743: Stanislas Leszczynski, former king of Poland
- 1774: Louis XV, there the week before his death
- 1810–1814: Empress Marie Louise, wife of Napoleon I
- 1830–1848: Queen Marie Amélie, wife of Louis Philippe I

It is an official residence of the President of France, used for receiving foreign dignitaries.

== See also ==
- Maison de plaisance
- Public Establishment of the Palace, Museum and National Estate of Versailles
- Subsidiary structures of the Palace of Versailles

=== Derivative buildings ===
- Petit Trianon
- Rosecliff
