= Louis-Marie-Edmond Blanquart de Bailleul =

French Roman Catholic bishop

- Archbishop of Rouen
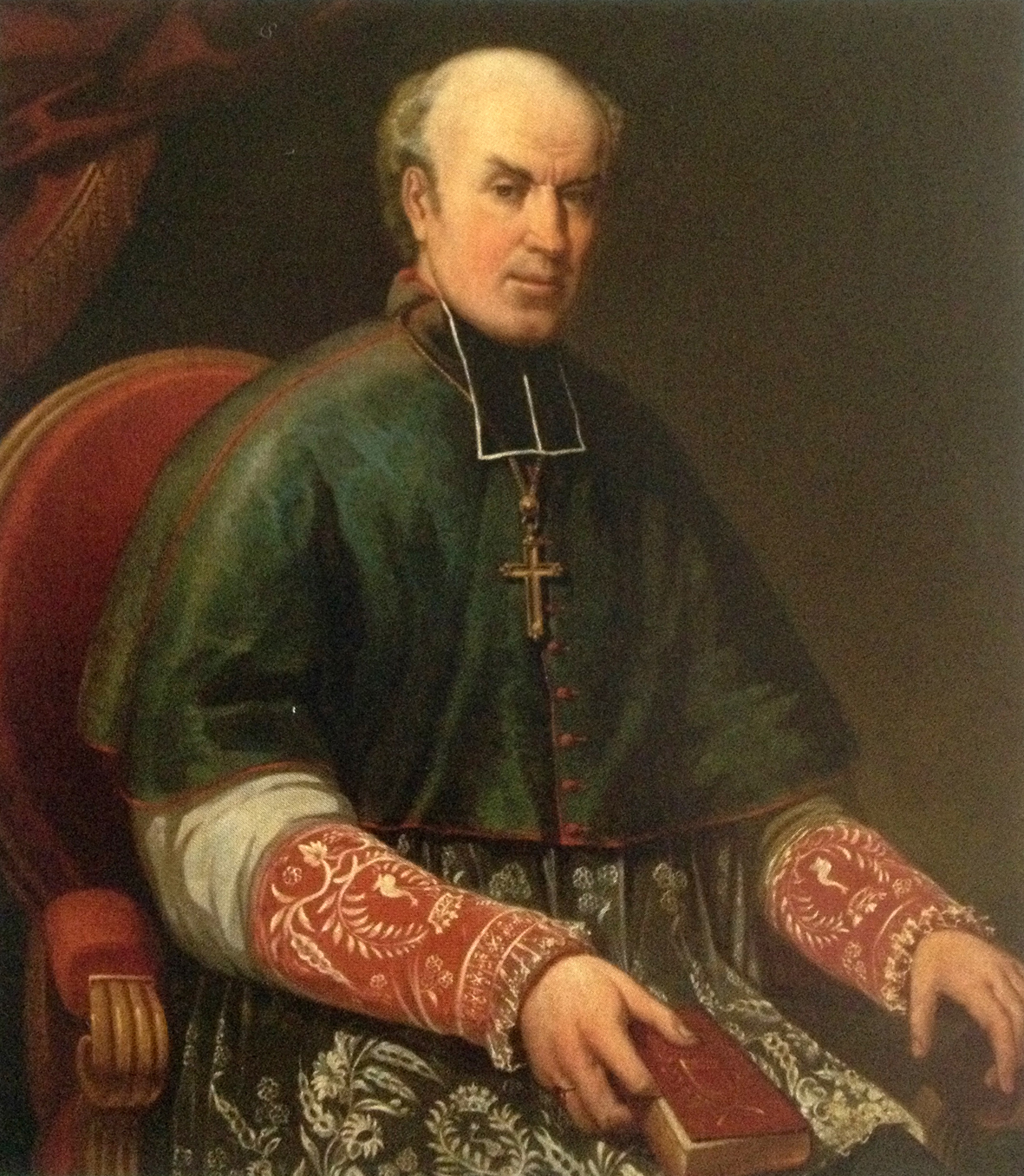
- Archbishop-Emeritus Blanquart de Bailleul, painted by Alexandre-Amédée Dupuy Delaroche (1872)
- Church: Catholic Church
- Archdiocese: Archdiocese of Rouen
- In office: 17 June 1844 – 12 March 1858
- Predecessor: Gustave Maximilien Juste de Croÿ-Solre
- Successor: Henri-Marie-Gaston Boisnormand de Bonnechose
- Previous post: Bishop of Versailles (1832–1844)

Orders
- Ordination: 12 June 1824
- Consecration: 27 January 1833 by Hyacinthe-Louis de Quélen

Personal details
- Born: 8 September 1795 Calais, Pas-de-Calais, France
- Died: 30 December 1868 (aged 73)

Louis-Marie-Edmond Blanquart de Bailleul (8 September 1795, Calais – 30 December 1868) was a French Roman Catholic bishop. He worked as a lawyer for a time, before becoming the third bishop of Versailles (1832–1844) and then archbishop of Rouen (1844–1858). As bishop of Versailles, on 18 October 1837 he presided over the Catholic marriage service of Princess Marie of Orléans and Duke Alexander of Württemberg at Versailles, and in 1843 he consecrated Versailles's main town church as the cathedral of the 33-year-old diocese.
