= Ernest I of Saxe-Coburg and Gotha =

Ernest I
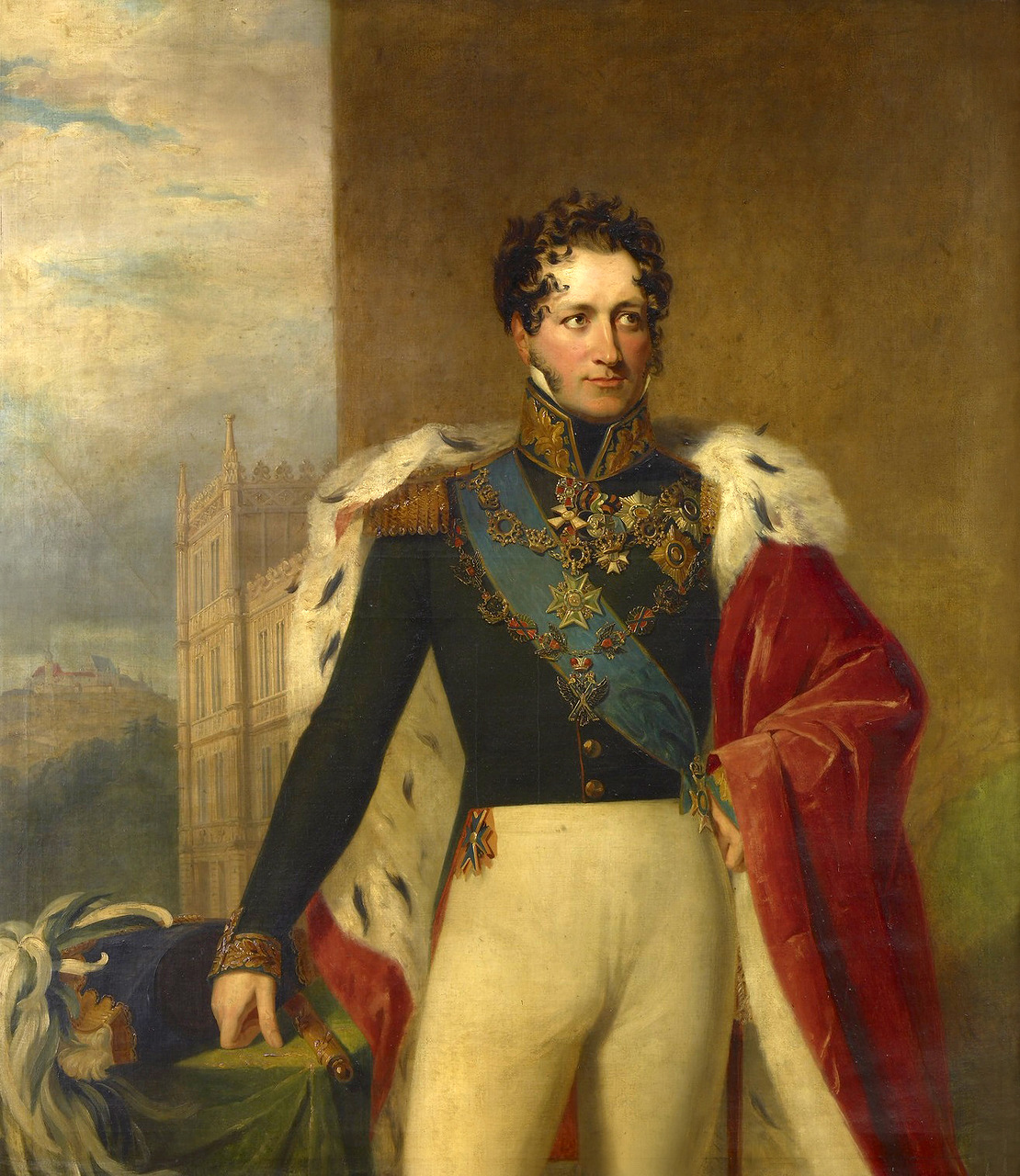
- Portrait by George Dawe, c. 1819

Duke of Saxe-Coburg-Saalfeld (as Ernest III)
- Reign: 9 December 1806 – 12 November 1826
- Predecessor: Francis

Duke of Saxe-Coburg and Gotha (as Ernest I)
- Reign: 12 November 1826 – 29 January 1844
- Predecessor: Frederick IV
- Successor: Ernest II
- Born: Ernst Anton Karl Ludwig Prinz von Sachsen-Coburg-Saalfeld; 2 January 1784; Coburg, Saxe-Coburg-Saalfeld, Holy Roman Empire
- Died: 29 January 1844 (aged 60); Gotha, Saxe-Coburg and Gotha, German Confederation
- Burial: Morizkirche, then Friedhof am Glockenberg
- Spouses: Princess Louise of Saxe-Gotha-Altenburg (m. 1817; div. 1826) Duchess Marie of Württemberg (m. 1832)
- Issue: Ernest II, Duke of Saxe-Coburg and Gotha; Albert, Prince Consort of the United Kingdom
- House: Saxe-Coburg-Saalfeld (until 1826); Saxe-Coburg and Gotha (from 1826)
- Father: Francis, Duke of Saxe-Coburg-Saalfeld
- Mother: Countess Augusta Reuss of Ebersdorf
- Religion: Lutheranism

Ernest I (German: Ernst Anton Karl Ludwig; 2 January 1784 – 29 January 1844) served as the last sovereign duke of Saxe-Coburg-Saalfeld (as Ernest III) from 1806 to 1826 and the first sovereign duke of Saxe-Coburg and Gotha from 1826 to 1844. He was the father of Prince Albert, who was the husband of Queen Victoria. Ernest fought against Napoleon Bonaparte, and through construction projects and the establishment of a court theatre, he left a strong imprint on his residence town, Coburg.

== Early life ==
Ernest was born on 2 January 1784. He was the eldest son of Francis, Duke of Saxe-Coburg-Saalfeld by his second wife, Countess Augusta of Reuss-Ebersdorf. His youngest brother, Leopold, was later elected the first king of Belgium. One of his sisters, Victoria, was the mother of Queen Victoria, with the result that from the time his second son, Albert, married Queen Victoria in 1840, he was both uncle and father-in-law to Queen Victoria.

On 10 May 1803, aged 19, Ernest was proclaimed an adult, because his father had become gravely ill, and he was required to take part in the government of the duchy. When his father died in 1806, he succeeded in the duchy of Saxe-Coburg-Saalfeld as Ernest III. However, he could not immediately take over the formal government of his lands, because the duchy was occupied by Napoleonic troops and was under French administration. The following year, after the Peace of Tilsit (1807), the duchy of Saxe-Coburg-Saalfeld was reunited (having previously been dissolved) and restored to Ernest. This occurred through Russian pressure, since his sister Juliane was married to the brother of the Russian Tsar.

== Marriages and children ==
Ernest married Princess Louise of Saxe-Gotha-Altenburg in Gotha on 31 July 1817. They had two children:

- Ernest II, Duke of Saxe-Coburg and Gotha (21 June 1818 – 22 August 1893), who married Princess Alexandrine of Baden on 3 May 1842.
- Prince Albert of Saxe-Coburg and Gotha (26 August 1819 – 14 December 1861), who married Queen Victoria of the United Kingdom on 10 February 1840. They had nine children.

The marriage was unhappy because both husband and wife were promiscuous. As the biographer Lytton Strachey put it: "The ducal court was not noted for the strictness of its morals; the Duke was a man of gallantry, and it was rumoured that the Duchess followed her husband's example. There were scandals: one of the Court Chamberlains, a charming and cultivated man of Jewish extraction, was talked of; at last there was a separation, followed by a divorce. The Duchess retired to Paris, and died unhappily in 1831." Ernest and Louise were separated in 1824 and were officially divorced on 31 March 1826. As heirs to Coburg, the children remained with their father.

In Coburg on 23 December 1832, Ernest married his niece Duchess Marie of Württemberg, the daughter of his sister Antoinette. They had no children. This marriage made Marie both Prince Albert's first cousin and his stepmother.

Ernest had three illegitimate children:

- Berta Ernestine von Schauenstein (26 January 1817 – Coburg, 15 August 1896), born to Sophie Fermepin de Marteaux. She married her first cousin Eduard Edgar Schmidt-Löwe von Löwenfels, the illegitimate son of her father's sister, Juliane.
- Ernst Albert and Robert Ferdinand, twins born in 1838 to Margaretha Braun. They were created Freiherren von Bruneck in 1856.

== Estates ==
After 1813, Ernest was a Prussian general and participated in military actions against Napoleon. He fought in the battles of Lützen and Leipzig (1813), and drew in 1814 into the French fortress of Mainz. After the battle of Leipzig, he commanded the 5. Armeekorps.

After the defeat of Napoleon in the Battle of Waterloo, the Congress of Vienna on 9 June 1815 gave Ernest an area of 450 square kilometres with 25,000 inhabitants around the town of St. Wendel. Its area was somewhat augmented by the second Treaty of Paris. In 1816, this estate received the name of Principality of Lichtenberg. Ernest sold it to Prussia in 1834.

In 1825, Frederick IV, Duke of Saxe-Gotha-Altenburg, who was the uncle of Ernest's first wife Louise, died without an heir. This resulted in a rearrangement of the Ernestine duchies. It was only as a member of the Ernestine dynasty (and not as Louise's husband) that Ernest had a claim on the late duke's estates. However, he was at that time in the process of divorcing Louise, and the other branches used this as a leverage to drive a better bargain for themselves by insisting that he should not inherit Gotha. They reached a compromise on 12 November 1826: Ernest received Gotha, but had to cede Saalfeld to Saxe-Meiningen. He subsequently became "Ernest I, Duke of Saxe-Coburg and Gotha". Although he had given a constitution to Coburg in 1821, he did not interfere in the system of government in Gotha.

At Coburg, Ernest was responsible for various construction projects, including the establishment of the Hoftheater in its new building. The Schlossplatz as it appears today is largely due to work under his rule. He is chiefly remembered for the economic, educational and constitutional development of his territories, and for the significant international position attained by the house of Coburg.

== Death and burial ==
Ernest died on 29 January 1844 and was initially buried in the Morizkirche but later reinterred in the newly built mausoleum in Friedhof am Glockenberg.

== Honours ==
He received the following awards:

- Russian Empire:
  - Gold Sword for Bravery, in Diamonds, June 1807
  - Knight of St. George, 4th Class, 9 September 1813
  - Knight of St. Alexander Nevsky, in Diamonds, 1813
  - Knight of St. Andrew
  - Knight of St. Anna, 1st Class
- Kingdom of Saxony:
  - Knight of the Rue Crown, 1810
  - Grand Cross of the Military Order of St. Henry, 1815
- Austrian Empire: Grand Cross of the Royal Hungarian Order of St. Stephen, 1820
- Saxe-Weimar-Eisenach: Grand Cross of the White Falcon, 6 January 1828
- (Saxe-Coburg and Gotha) (Duchy of Saxe-Altenburg) (Saxe-Meiningen) Ernestine duchies:
  - Joint Founder and Grand Master of the Saxe-Ernestine House Order, 25 December 1833
  - Grand Master of Order of Saint Joachim
- Belgium: Grand Cordon of the Order of Leopold, 15 July 1835
- Kingdom of Portugal:
  - Grand Cross of the Tower and Sword, 9 December 1835
  - Grand Cross of the Royal Military Order of Our Lord Jesus Christ, 23 April 1836
- United Kingdom: Stranger Knight of the Garter, 16 July 1838
- Kingdom of France: Grand Cross of the Legion of Honour, May 1840
- Baden:
  - Knight of the House Order of Fidelity, 1842
  - Grand Cross of the Zähringer Lion, 1842
- Kingdom of Prussia:
  - Knight of the Black Eagle
  - Grand Cross of the Red Eagle

== Ancestry ==
Ancestors of Ernest I of Saxe-Coburg and Gotha

8. Francis Josias, Duke of Saxe-Coburg-Saalfeld
4. Ernest Frederick, Duke of Saxe-Coburg-Saalfeld
9. Princess Anna Sophie of Schwarzburg-Rudolstadt
2. Francis, Duke of Saxe-Coburg-Saalfeld
10. Ferdinand Albert II, Duke of Brunswick-Wolfenbüttel
5. Princess Sophie Antoinette of Brunswick-Wolfenbüttel
11. Princess Antoinette of Brunswick-Wolfenbüttel
1. Ernest I, Duke of Saxe-Coburg and Gotha
12. Heinrich XXIX, Count of Reuss-Ebersdorf
6. Heinrich XXIV, Count Reuss of Ebersdorf
13. Countess Sophie Theodora of Castell-Remlingen
3. Countess Augusta Reuss of Ebersdorf
14. George August, Count of Erbach-Schönberg
7. Countess Karoline Ernestine of Erbach-Schönberg
15. Ferdinande Henriette, Countess of Stolberg-Gedern

Ernest I of Saxe-Coburg and Gotha House of Wettin Born: 2 January 1784 Died: 29 January 1844
Regnal titles
Preceded by Francis	Duke of Saxe-Coburg-Saalfeld; 1806–26	Became Duke of Saxe-Coburg and Gotha
Previously Duke of Saxe-Coburg-Saalfeld	Duke of Saxe-Coburg and Gotha; 1826–44	Succeeded by Ernest II
