= Robert von Keudell =

German diplomat and politician (1824–1903)

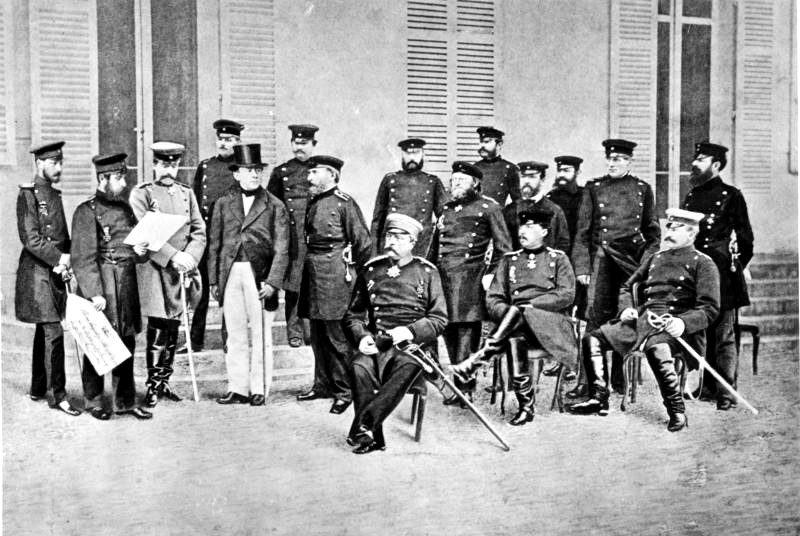
Keudell (seated on right) at German Army HQ at Versailles during the Franco-Prussian War of 1870

Robert von Keudell (27 February 1824 – 25/26 April 1903) was a German diplomat, politician and music lover.

== Life ==
Von Keudell's parents were the Prussian major Leopold von Keudell (1769–1831) and his wife Wilhelmine von Hartmann (1789–1848). He was born in Königsberg. Keudell studied law at the Albertina University in Königsberg.

Keudell was an excellent pianist and admirer of Robert Schumann, with whom he corresponded from 1847 to 1853. His two wives were also talented pianists. His second wife played with Joseph Joachim and Anton Rubinstein, among others. In 1839–1840, he had become acquainted with Fanny Hensel in Italy and had encouraged her composition.

From 1872 to 1873 he was German envoy at the Sublime Porte in Constantinople. In 1873 he became envoy to the Quirinal in Rome and - as a result of the embassy upgrading from 1876 – German ambassador in Italy (until 1887). As a member of the Free Conservative Party he sat in the Reichstag in 1871–1872 and from 1890 to 1893. From 1870 to 1872 and again from 1889 to 1893 he was a member of the Prussian House of Representatives. He was a close friend of the German Chancellor Otto von Bismarck.

Robert von Keudell married on February 1, 1870 Hedwig Louise von Patow (1842–1882), a daughter of the politician Robert von Patow. After the death of his first wife, he married Alexandra von Grünhof (1861–1933), daughter of the Duke Ernst von Württemberg (1807–1868), and granddaughter of Duke Alexander of Württemberg and Princess Antoinette of Saxe-Coburg-Saalfeld. They had three children together:

- Walter von Keudell (1884–1973)
- Otto Viktor von Keudell (1887–1972)

Otto Viktor von Keudell would marry Maria Momm and have six children.

- Hedwig von Keudell (1891-1987)

Hedwig von Keudell would marry Karl von der Trenck and have five children. Their youngest child, Ilse von der Trenck (1930-) would go on to marry Wolfram Vogel and their youngest daughter, Karin Vogel (1973-) is known for being the last person in Succession to the British throne.

Robert von Keudell died on April 25/26 1903 in Chojna.
