= Francis, Duke of Saxe-Coburg-Saalfeld =

Duke of Saxe-Coburg-Saalfeld from 1800 to 1806

Francis
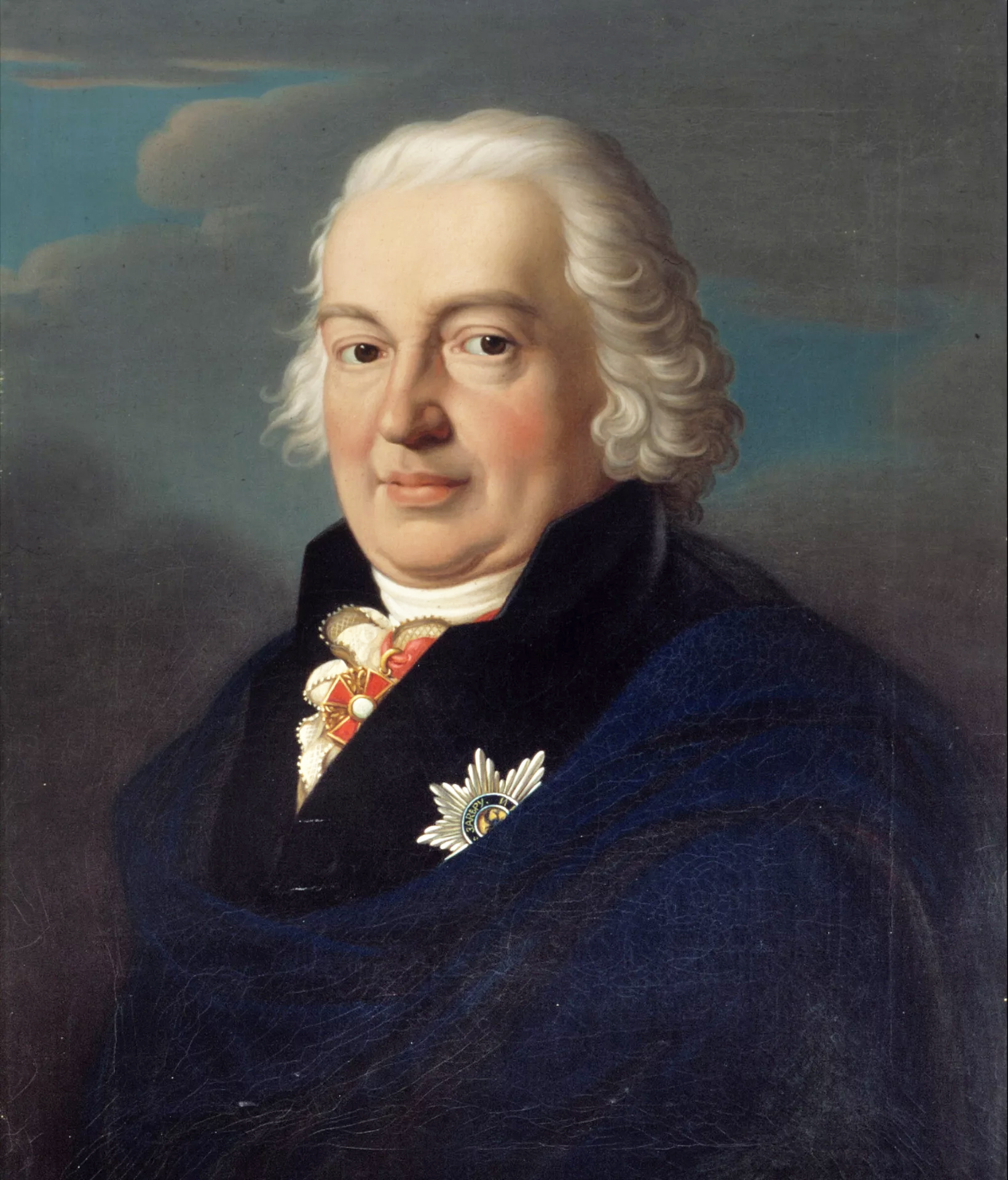
- Portrait by Johann Heinrich Schröder, 1800

Duke of Saxe-Coburg-Saalfeld
- Reign: 8 September 1800 – 9 December 1806
- Predecessor: Ernest Frederick
- Successor: Ernest III
- Born: Franz Friedrich Anton; 15 July 1750; Coburg, Saxe-Coburg-Saalfeld, Holy Roman Empire
- Died: 9 December 1806 (aged 56); Coburg, Saxe-Coburg-Saalfeld
- Spouse: Princess Sophie of Saxe-Hildburghausen (m. 1776; died 1776); Countess Augusta Reuss of Ebersdorf (m. 1777)
- Issue: Sophie, Countess of Mensdorff-Pouilly; Antoinette, Duchess of Württemberg; Juliane (Anna), Grand Duchess of Russia; Ernest I of Saxe-Coburg and Gotha; Ferdinand, Prince of Saxe-Coburg and Gotha-Koháry; Princess Victoria, Duchess of Kent and Strathearn; Princess Marianne; Leopold I of Belgium; Prince Franz
- House: Saxe-Coburg-Saalfeld
- Father: Ernest Frederick, Duke of Saxe-Coburg-Saalfeld
- Mother: Duchess Sophie Antoinette of Brunswick-Wolfenbüttel

Francis, Duke of Saxe-Coburg-Saalfeld (German: Franz Friedrich Anton, Herzog von Sachsen-Coburg-Saalfeld, 15 July 1750 – 9 December 1806), was a reigning Duke of Saxe-Coburg-Saalfeld, one of the ruling Thuringian dukes of the House of Wettin. As progenitor of a line of Coburg princes who, in the 19th and 20th centuries, ascended the thrones of several European realms, he is a patrilineal ancestor of the royal houses of Belgium and Bulgaria (and also of Portugal until the death of King Manuel II in 1932 and the United Kingdom until the death of Queen Elizabeth II in 2022), as well as of several queens consort and the empress consort of Mexico in the 1860s.

== Biography ==
Francis was born on 15 July 1750. He was the eldest son of Ernest Frederick, Duke of Saxe-Coburg-Saalfeld and Duchess Sophie Antoinette of Brunswick-Wolfenbüttel.

Francis received a private, careful and comprehensive education and became an art connoisseur. Francis initiated a major collection of books and illustrations for the duchy in 1775, which eventually expanded to a 300,000-picture collection of copperplate engravings currently housed in the Veste Coburg.

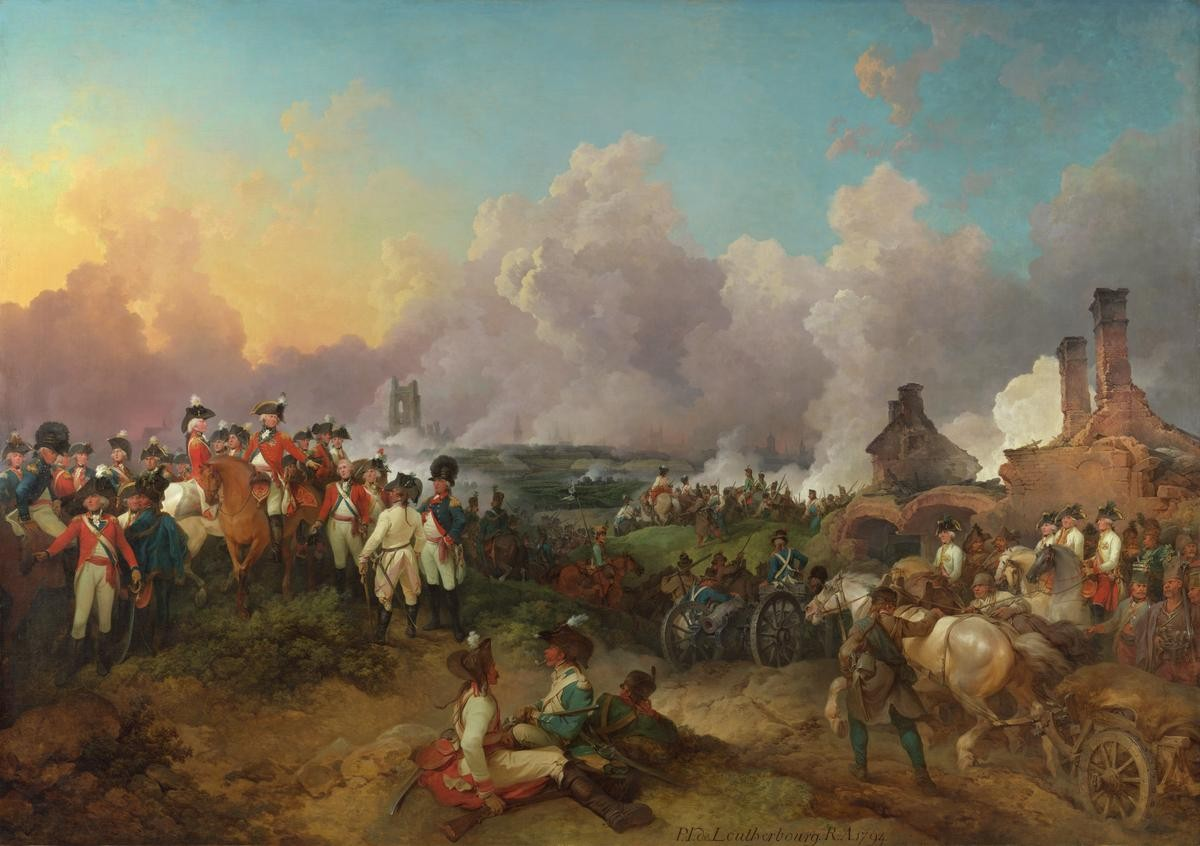
The Grand Attack on Valenciennes by Philip James de Loutherbourg, 1794. He is amongst the officers around the Duke of York.

Francis was commissioned into the allied army in 1793 when his country was invaded by the Revolutionary armies of France. The allied forces included Hanoverians, Hessians, and the British. He fought in several actions against the French.

Francis succeeded his father as reigning Duke of Saxe-Coburg-Saalfeld in 1800. In the discharge of his father's debts the Schloss Rosenau had passed out of the family but in 1805 he bought back the property as a summer residence for the ducal family.

Emperor Francis II dissolved the Holy Roman Empire on 6 August 1806, after its defeat by Napoleon at the Battle of Austerlitz. Duke Francis died 9 December 1806. On 15 December 1806, Saxe-Coburg-Saalfeld, along with the other Ernestine duchies, entered the Confederation of the Rhine as the Duke and his ministers planned.

== First marriage ==
In Hildburghausen on 6 March 1776, Francis married Princess Sophie of Saxe-Hildburghausen, a daughter of his Ernestine kinsman, Duke Ernst Friedrich III and Princess Ernestine of Saxe-Weimar-Eisenach. She died on 28 October 1776, only seven months after her wedding. There were no children born from this marriage.

== Second marriage and children ==
In Ebersdorf on 13 June 1777, Francis married Countess Augusta Reuss of Lobenstein-Ebersdorf, daughter of Heinrich XXIV, Count Reuss of Ebersdorf and his wife Countess Karoline Ernestine of Erbach-Schönberg. They had ten children, seven of whom survived to adulthood:

Name	Date of birth	Date of death	Age at death	Notes
Sophie Fredericka Caroline Luise	19 August 1778, in Coburg	8 July 1835, in Tušimice, Bohemia	56 years	Married on 23 February 1804 to Emmanuel von Mensdorff-Pouilly (later Count von Mensdorff-Pouilly).
Antoinette Ernestine Amalie	28 August 1779, in Coburg	14 March 1824, in St. Petersburg	44 years	Married on 17 November 1798 to Alexander of Württemberg.
Juliane Henriette Ulrike (upon her marriage, she took the name Anna Feodorovna in a Russian Orthodox baptism)	23 September 1781, in Coburg	15 August 1860, in Elfenau, near Berne, Switzerland	78 years	Married on 26 February 1796 to Grand Duke Constantine Pavlovich of Russia, the younger brother of Czar Alexander I of Russia (they divorced in 1820).
Stillborn son	1782	1782	–	
Ernst I Anton Karl Ludwig, Duke of Saxe-Coburg and Gotha	2 January 1784, in Coburg	29 January 1844, in Gotha	60 years	Married on 31 July 1817 to Princess Louise of Saxe-Gotha-Altenburg (1800–1831); father of Prince Albert, the husband of Queen Victoria. After their divorce in 1826 and the death of Louise in 1831, he married his niece Marie of Württemberg, daughter of his sister Antoinette.
Ferdinand Georg August	28 March 1785, in Coburg	27 August 1851, in Vienna	66 years	Married on 30 November 1815 to Princess Maria Antonia Koháry of Csábrág and Szitnya; father of Ferdinand II of Portugal and Victoria, Duchess of Nemours, and the grandfather of Ferdinand I of Bulgaria. By his marriage he became the founder of the Catholic Koháry branch of the Saxe-Coburg and Gotha line.
Marie Luise Victoria	17 August 1786, in Coburg	16 March 1861, in Frogmore House	74 years	Married on 21 December 1803 Carl Friedrich Wilhelm Emich, Prince of Leiningen, had issue. After his death, she married on 11 July 1818 Prince Edward Augustus, Duke of Kent and Strathearn, the fourth son of King George III of Great Britain; by that marriage she became the mother of Queen Victoria.
Marianne Charlotte	7 August 1788, in Coburg	23 August 1794, in Coburg	6 years	
Leopold Georg Christian Frederick	16 December 1790, in Coburg	10 December 1865, in Laeken	74 years	Married, firstly, on 2 May 1816 Charlotte of Wales, daughter of George IV of the United Kingdom, who died from complications of childbirth on 6 November 1817. Married, secondly, on 9 August 1830 to Louise of Orléans and his children included Leopold II of Belgium and Empress Carlota of Mexico. First king of the Belgians under the name of Leopold I.
Franz Maximilian Ludwig	12 December 1792, in Coburg	3 January 1793, in Coburg	22 days	

His male-line descendants established ruling houses in Belgium, United Kingdom, Portugal and Bulgaria, while retaining the duchy of Saxe-Coburg and Gotha until 1918. His son Leopold ruled as Leopold I of the Belgians. A grandson reigned jure uxoris as King Ferdinand II of Portugal while a great-grandson named Ferdinand became the first modern king of Bulgaria. One of his granddaughters was Empress Carlota of Mexico, while another was Queen Victoria of the United Kingdom of Great Britain and Ireland. The latter's son, Edward VII, a patrilineal as well as matrilineal great-grandson of Francis, inaugurated upon his accession to the British throne in 1901 the House of Saxe-Coburg and Gotha, the name of the ruling dynasty of the United Kingdom until the house name was changed to Windsor by King George V in 1917.

== Ancestry ==
Ancestors of Francis, Duke of Saxe-Coburg-Saalfeld

8. John Ernest IV
4. Francis Josias, Duke of Saxe-Coburg-Saalfeld
9. Countess Charlotte Johanna of Waldeck-Wildungen
2. Ernest Frederick, Duke of Saxe-Coburg-Saalfeld
10. Louis Frederick I, Prince of Schwarzburg-Rudolstadt
5. Princess Anna Sophie of Schwarzburg-Rudolstadt
11. Princess Anna Sophie of Saxe-Gotha-Altenburg
1. Francis, Duke of Saxe-Coburg-Saalfeld
12. Ferdinand Albert I, Duke of Brunswick-Wolfenbüttel-Bevern
6. Ferdinand Albert II, Duke of Brunswick-Wolfenbüttel
13. Princess Christine of Hesse-Eschwege
3. Princess Sophie Antoinette of Brunswick-Wolfenbüttel
14. Louis Rudolph, Duke of Brunswick
7. Princess Antoinette of Brunswick-Wolfenbüttel
15. Princess Christine Louise of Oettingen-Oettingen

Francis, Duke of Saxe-Coburg-Saalfeld House of Wettin Born: 15 July 1750 Died: 9 December 1806
Regnal titles
Preceded by Ernest Frederick	Duke of Saxe-Coburg-Saalfeld; 1800–1806	Succeeded by Ernest III
