= Ernest of Wurttemberg =

Duke of Wurttemberg

Duke Ernest of Württemberg
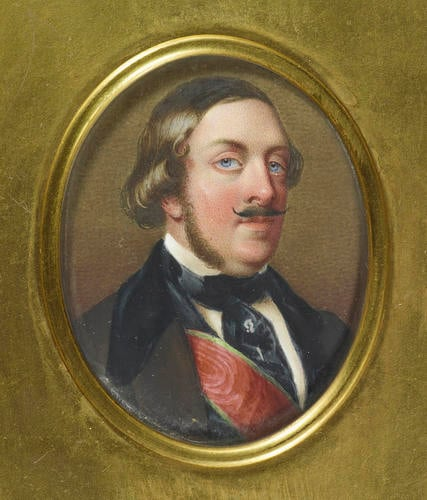
- Portrait by John Simpson. It was given to his cousins Prince Albert and Queen Victoria c. 1845
- Born: Ernest Alexander Konstantin; 11 Aug 1807; Riga
- Died: 26 October 1868 (aged 61); Coburg
- Burial: Glockenberg Cemetery
- Spouse: Nathalie Eschborn (m. 1860)
- Issue: Alexandra von Grünhof
- German: Herzog Ernst von Württemberg
- House: Württemberg
- Father: Duke Alexander of Wurttemberg
- Mother: Princess Antoinette of Saxe-Coburg-Saalfeld

Ernest of Württemberg (born Ernest Alexander Konstantin of Württemberg, 11 August 1807 - 26 Oct 1868) was the fourth child of Duke Alexander of Württemberg and Princess Antoinette of Saxe-Coburg-Saalfeld, making him a first cousin of Queen Victoria and her husband Prince Albert, along with being a Duke of Wurttemberg.

== Life ==
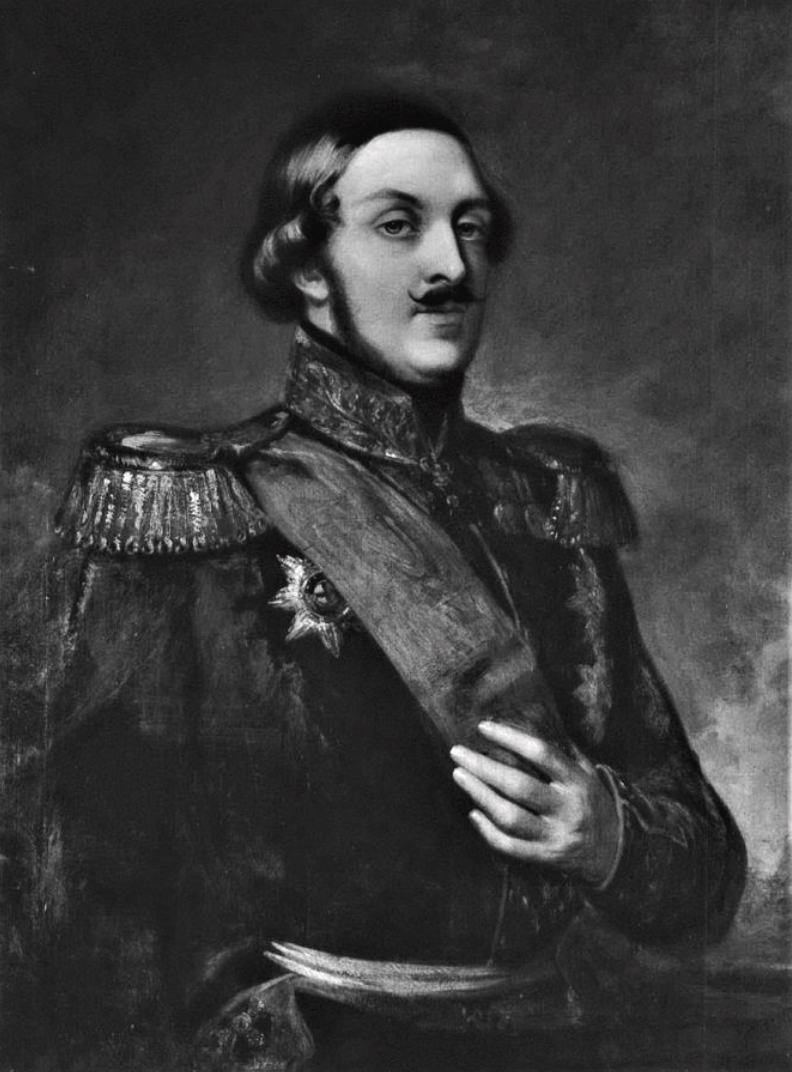
Ernest of Württemberg in his General outfit. It was commissioned by Queen Victoria and was finished c. 1844/45. It is now in the Royal Collection Trust

Ernest was born on 11 August 1807 in Riga to Duke Alexander of Württemberg and Princess Antoinette of Saxe-Coburg-Saalfeld. Ernest of Wurttemberg was also a General in the Württemberg Army. Not much is known about his military career other than his role as General. In June 1833, Ernest and his brother Alexander went to Kensington Palace to meet Princess Victoria. In her journal she wrote, "Alexander is very handsome and Ernest has a very kind expression. They are both extremely amiable." Most of the portraits of Ernest are in the Royal Collection for Queen Victoria.

== Personal life ==
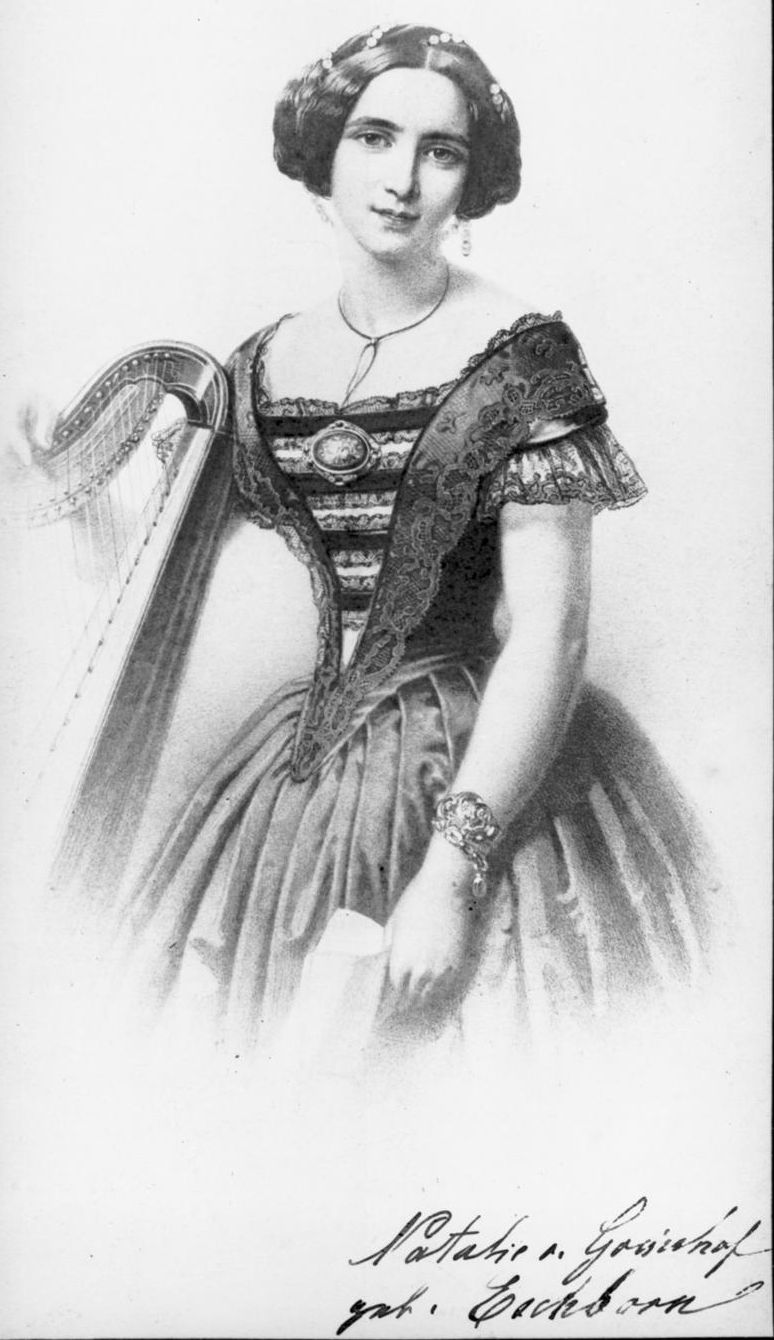
Ernest's wife Natalie Eschborn

=== Marriage ===
Ernest married morganatically to Nathalie Eschborn (1829–1905) in Hamburg on the 21 August 1860. Nathalie later changed her name to von Grünhof, and they had one daughter.

- Alexandra von Grünhof (10 August 1861 - 13 April 1933). Married Robert von Keudell in 1883 and had issue. Their great-granddaughter Karin Vogel is the last person in the British Line of Succession based on William Addams Reitwiesner's research published on WARGS.com in 2011.

Ernest of Württemberg died on 26 October 1868 at the age of 59 in Coburg. Ernest rests in Glockenberg Cemetery, in Coburg.
