= Duke Alexander of Württemberg (1804–1881) =

German nobleman (1804–1881)

Duke Alexander
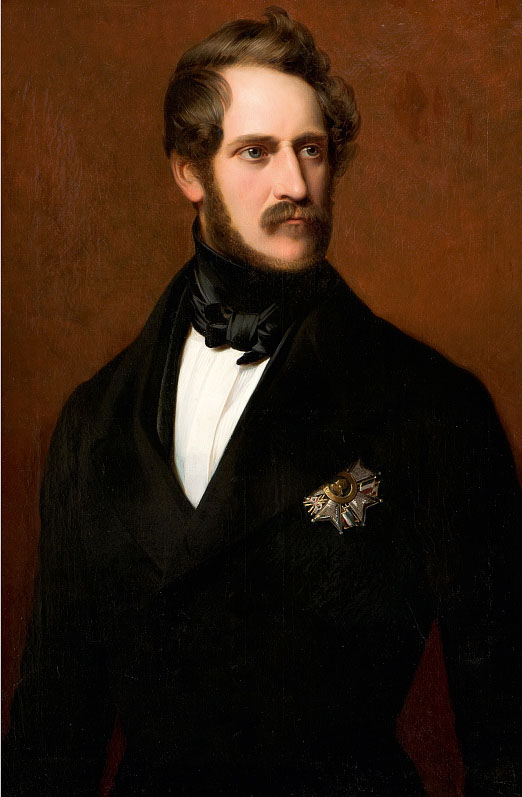
- Portrait by Franz Xaver Winterhalter, 1845
- Born: 20 December 1804; Riga, Governorate of Livonia, Russian Empire
- Died: 28 October 1881 (aged 76); Bayreuth, Kingdom of Bavaria
- Spouse: Princess Marie of Orléans (m. 1837; died 1839)
- Issue: Duke Philipp
Names
- Friedrich Wilhelm Alexander
- House: Württemberg
- Father: Duke Alexander of Württemberg
- Mother: Princess Antoinette of Saxe-Coburg-Saalfeld

Duke Alexander of Württemberg (20 December 1804 – 28 October 1881) was a member of the dynasty which ruled the German Kingdom of Württemberg. To marry a daughter of the French king, he agreed that their children would be raised in their mother's faith, thereby becoming ancestor of the Roman Catholic branch of his family.

== Biography ==
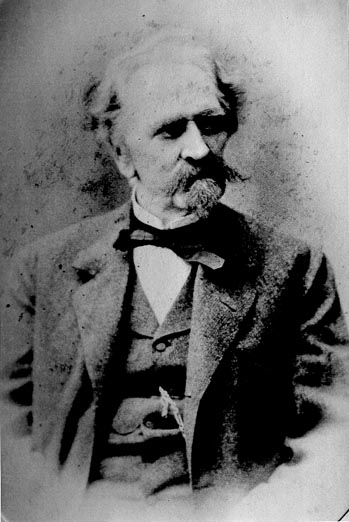
Duke Alexander, presumably in old age

He was the son of Duke Alexander of Württemberg and Princess Antoinette of Saxe-Coburg-Saalfeld. He was a first cousin of Queen Victoria and of her husband, Prince Albert. As a young man, Alexander was considered a possible marriage candidate for Victoria. In June 1833 he and his brother Ernest visited Kensington Palace. Victoria wrote in her journal, "Alexander is very handsome and Ernest has a very kind expression. They are both extremely amiable."

=== Marriage ===
On 17 October 1837 he married Princess Marie of Orléans (1813–1839), daughter of Louis Philippe I, King of the French. They had one child:

- Duke Philipp of Württemberg (30 July 1838—11 October 1917) he married Archduchess Marie Thérèse of Teschen on 18 January 1865. They had five children.

Alexander of Württemberg belonged to the fifth branch (called the ducal branch) of the House of Württemberg, descended from the seventh son of Frederick Eugene, ruler of Württemberg from 1795 to 1797. On the extinction of the direct line of kings in 1921, the ducal branch became the senior dynastic line of the deposed royal family. The House of Württemberg's two morganatic branches - the Dukes of Teck (extinct in the male line in 1981) and the Dukes of Urach - were senior by primogeniture to the ducal branch, but were ineligible to inherit the throne.

Duke Alexander is the direct male line ancestor of Wilhelm, Duke of Württemberg, the current claimant to the kingdom of Württemberg.

== Honours ==
- (Saxe-Coburg and Gotha) (Duchy of Saxe-Altenburg) (Saxe-Meiningen) Ernestine duchies: Grand Cross of the Saxe-Ernestine House Order, December 1833
- Belgium: Grand Cordon of the Order of Leopold, 23 December 1841
- Kingdom of Bavaria: Knight of St. Hubert, 1851

== Ancestry ==
Ancestors of Duke Alexander of Württemberg (1804–1881)

8. Charles Alexander, Duke of Württemberg
4. Frederick II Eugene, Duke of Württemberg
9. Princess Marie Auguste of Thurn and Taxis
2. Duke Alexander of Württemberg
10. Frederick William, Margrave of Brandenburg-Schwedt
5. Princess Friederike of Brandenburg-Schwedt
11. Princess Sophia Dorothea of Prussia
1. Duke Alexander of Württemberg
12. Ernest Frederick, Duke of Saxe-Coburg-Saalfeld
6. Francis, Duke of Saxe-Coburg-Saalfeld
13. Duchess Sophie Antoinette of Brunswick-Wolfenbüttel
3. Princess Antoinette of Saxe-Coburg-Saalfeld
14. Heinrich XXIV, Count Reuss of Ebersdorf
7. Countess Augusta Reuss of Ebersdorf
15. Countess Karoline Ernestine of Erbach-Schönberg
