= Countess Augusta Reuss of Ebersdorf =

Duchess of Saxe-Coburg-Saalfeld from 1800 to 1806

Countess Augusta of Reuss-Ebersdorf
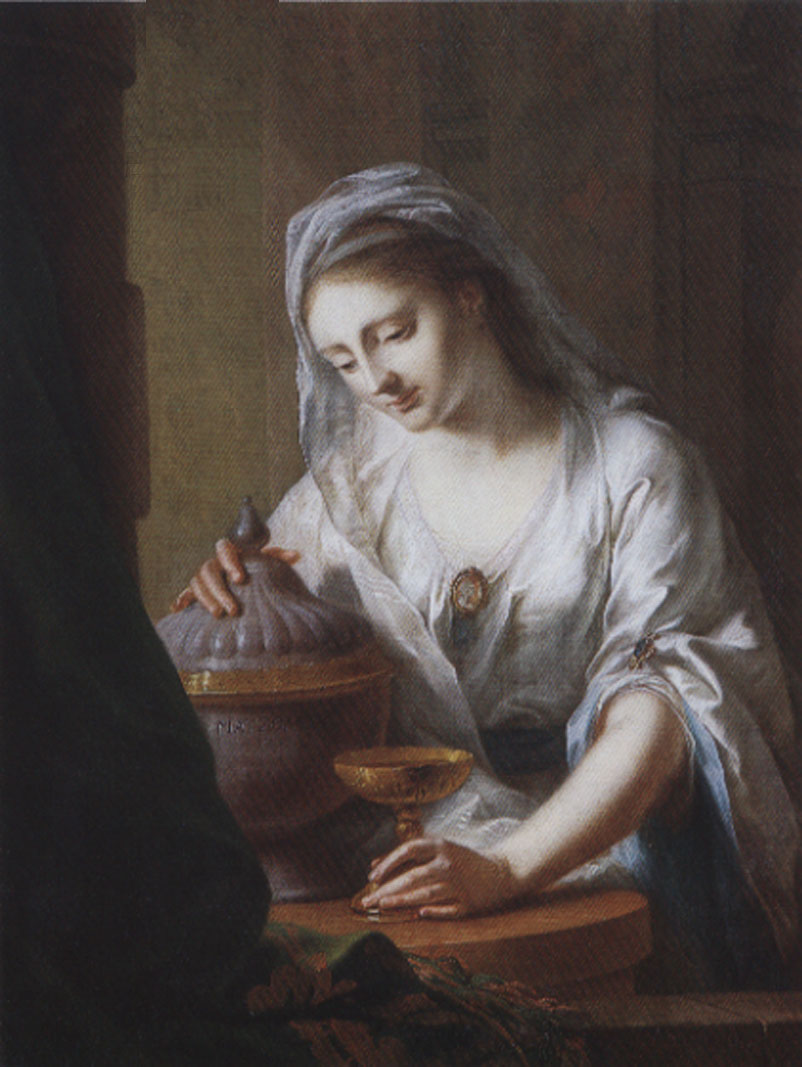
- Countess Augusta Reuss of Ebersdorf as Artemisia, 1775

Duchess consort of Saxe-Coburg-Saalfeld
- Tenure: 8 September 1800 – 9 December 1806
- Born: 19 January 1757; Ebersdorf
- Died: 16 November 1831 (aged 74); Coburg
- Spouse: Francis, Duke of Saxe-Coburg-Saalfeld (m. 1777; died 1806)
- Issue: Sophie, Countess of Mensdorff-Pouilly; Antoinette, Duchess Alexander of Württemberg; Juliane, Grand Duchess Anna Feodorovna of Russia; Ernest I, Duke of Saxe-Coburg and Gotha; Prince Ferdinand of Saxe-Coburg and Gotha; Princess Victoria, Duchess of Kent and Strathearn; Leopold I, King of the Belgians
Names
- Augusta Caroline Sophie
- House: Reuss
- Father: Heinrich XXIV, Count Reuss-Ebersdorf
- Mother: Karoline Ernestine of Erbach-Schönberg

Augusta of Reuss-Ebersdorf (German: Gräfin Augusta von Reuß zu Ebersdorf; 19 January 1757 – 16 November 1831), was by marriage the Duchess of Saxe-Coburg-Saalfeld. She was the grandmother and godmother of both Queen Victoria of the United Kingdom and her husband and cousin, Prince Albert of Saxe-Coburg and Gotha.

== Family ==
Augusta was born on 19 January 1757, the second of seven children of Heinrich XXIV, Count Reuss of Ebersdorf, and his wife, Countess Karoline Ernestine of Erbach-Schönberg. Her birthplace, Ebersdorf, was a center of Pietism in Thuringia and Augusta's grandparents were ardent admirers of this religious movement.

Augusta's grandaunt, Countess Erdmuthe Dorothea of Reuss-Ebersdorf, was married to Count Nicholas Louis von Zinzendorf und Pottendorf, leader of the revivalist Moravian Church. This background explains the deep religious feelings of Duchess Augusta in later years.

== Marriage ==
Her father commissioned a portrait of Augusta as Artemisia by the painter Johann Heinrich Tischbein. Count Heinrich XXIV showed this painting during the Perpetual Diet so potential marriage candidates were aware of his beautiful daughter.

In Ebersdorf on 13 June 1777, Augusta married Francis, Duke of Saxe-Coburg-Saalfeld, who previously acquired the Artemisia painting for four times the original price because he was deeply in love with Augusta, but he was already obliged to marry his relative Princess Sophie of Saxe-Hildburghausen. Sophie died of influenza on 28 October 1776, just seven months after their wedding, so the young Duke was free to marry again. Francis and Augusta married in early 1777.

During her marriage, Augusta bore her husband 10 children, though only seven of them survived to adulthood; some of their children played important roles in European history, such as Victoria, Duchess of Kent, and King Leopold I of Belgium.

== Issue ==
Name	Date of birth	Date of death	Age at death	Notes
Sophie Friederike	19 August 1778, in Coburg	8 July 1835, in Tušimice, Bohemia	56 years	Married on 23 February 1804 to Emmanel, Count von Mensdorff-Pouilly.
Antoinette	28 August 1779, in Coburg	14 March 1824, in St. Petersburg	44 years	Married on 17 November 1798 to Duke Alexander of Württemberg.
Juliane (upon her marriage, she took the name Anna Feodorovna in a Russian Orthodox baptism)	23 September 1781, in Coburg	15 August 1860, in Elfenau, near Berne, Switzerland	78 years	Married on 26 February 1796 to Grand Duke Konstantin Pavlovich of Russia, the younger brother of Czar Alexander I of Russia (they divorced in 1820).
Stillborn son	1782	1782	–	
Ernest I, Duke of Saxe-Coburg and Gotha	2 January 1784, in Coburg	29 January 1844, in Gotha	60 years	Married on 31 July 1817 to Princess Louise of Saxe-Gotha-Altenburg (1800–1831) the father of Prince Albert, the husband of Queen Victoria (Ernest and Louise divorced in 1826).
Ferdinand	28 March 1785, in Coburg	27 August 1851, in Vienna	66 years	Married on 30 November 1815 to Princess Antonia Koháry de Csábrág. He was the father of Ferdinand II of Portugal and Victoria, Duchess of Nemours, and the paternal grandfather of Ferdinand I of Bulgaria. By his marriage, he became the founder of the Koháry branch of the Saxe-Coburg and Gotha line.
Marie Luise Victoria	17 August 1786, in Coburg	16 March 1861, in Frogmore House	74 years	Married on 21 December 1803 at Coburg Charles, Prince of Leiningen. Married on 11 July 1818 to Prince Edward Augustus, Duke of Kent and Strathearn, the fourth son of King George III of Great Britain. She was the mother of Queen Victoria.
Marianne Charlotte	7 August 1788, in Coburg	23 August 1794, in Coburg	6 years	
Leopold Georg Christian Frederick	16 December 1790, in Coburg	10 December 1865, in Laeken	74 years	Married on 2 May 1816 to Princess Charlotte of Wales. Married on 9 August 1830 to Louise of Orléans and his children included Leopold II of Belgium and Empress Carlota of Mexico. First king of the Belgians under the name of Leopold I.
Franz Maximilian Ludwig	12 December 1792, in Coburg	3 January 1793, in Coburg	22 days	

== Notable descendants ==
Countess Augusta was the grandmother of many notable monarchs of Europe, including both Queen Victoria of the United Kingdom (through her mother Victoria) and her husband, Prince Albert (through his father Ernst), King Consort of Portugal Ferdinand II (through his father Prince Ferdinand of Saxe-Coburg and Gotha), and also Empress Carlota of Mexico and her brother Leopold II of Belgium (through their father Leopold I who was elected King of the Belgians on 26 June 1831).

Countess Augusta Reuss of Ebersdorf House of Reuss-Ebersdorf Cadet branch of the House of Reuss Born: 19 January 1757 Died: 16 November 1831
German royalty
Preceded by Sophia Antonia of Brunswick-Wolfenbüttel	Duchess consort of Saxe-Coburg-Saalfeld; 8 September 1800 – 9 December 1806	Vacant Title next held by Louise of Saxe-Gotha-Altenburg
