= Duke Alexander of Württemberg (1771–1833) =

German noble

Duke Alexander
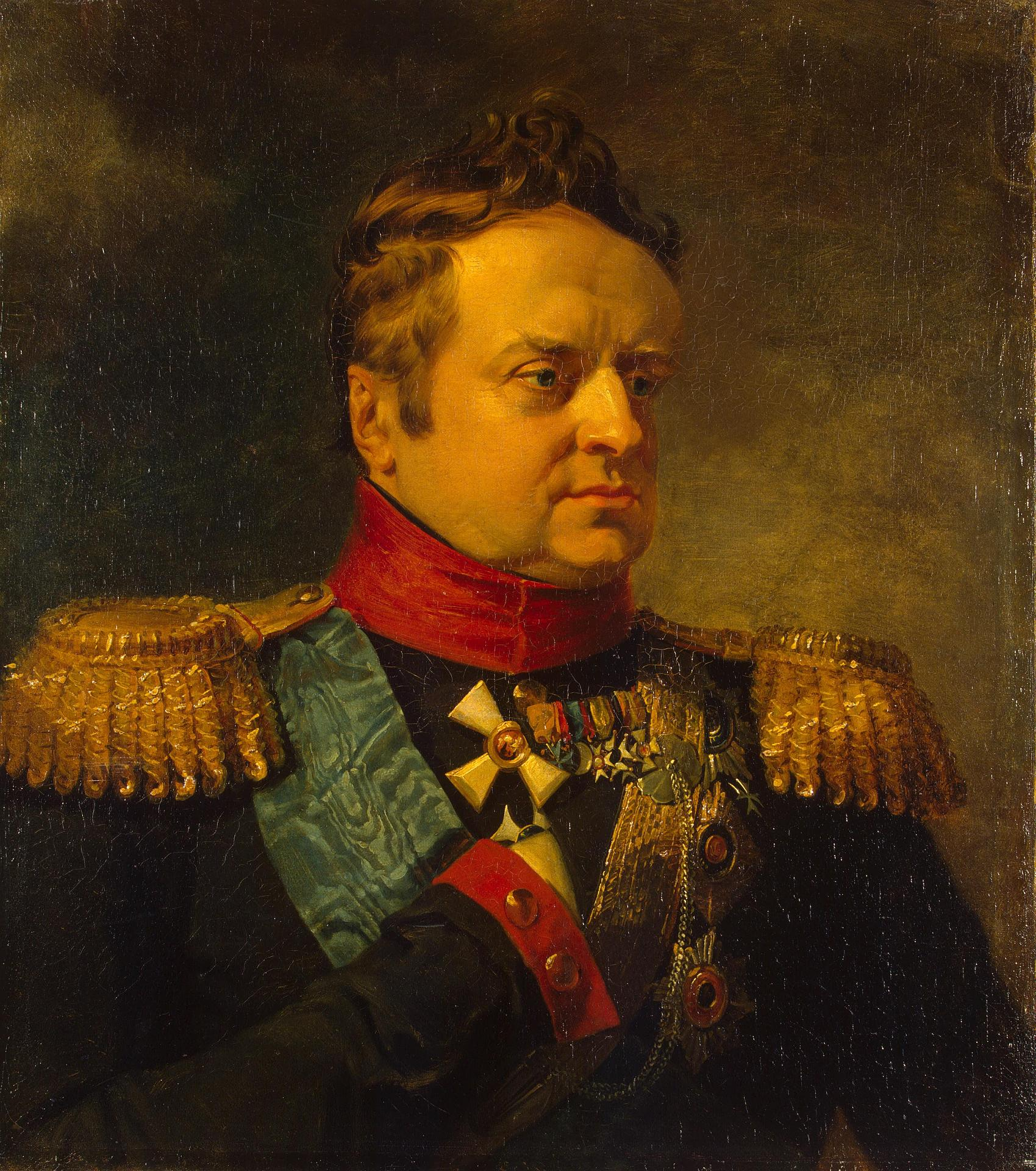
- Portrait by George Dawe, 1823
- Born: 24 April 1771; Mömpelgard, County of Montbéliard, Holy Roman Empire (now Arrondissement of Montbéliard, Bourgogne-Franche-Comté, Republic of France)
- Died: 4 July 1833 (aged 62); Gotha, Duchy of Saxe-Coburg and Gotha (now Thuringia), Imperial Confederate of Germany (now Federal Republic of Germany)
- Spouse: Princess Antoinette of Saxe-Coburg-Saalfeld (m. 1798; died 1824)
- Issue: Marie, Duchess of Saxe-Coburg and Gotha; Duke Paul; Duke Alexander; Duke Ernst; Duke Friedrich
Names
- Alexander Friedrich Karl
- House: Württemberg
- Father: Duke Friedrich II Eugen, Duke of Württemberg
- Mother: Princess Friederike of Brandenburg-Schwedt
- Military career
- Allegiance: Kingdom of Württemberg; Austrian Empire; Russian Empire
- Branch: Army
- Service years: 1791–1832

Duke Alexander of Württemberg (24 April 1771 – 4 July 1833) was a Duke of Württemberg and son of Frederick II Eugene, Duke of Württemberg and Sophia Dorothea of Brandenburg-Schwedt. His sister Sophie Dorothea married Tsar Paul I of Russia.

== Family ==
In 1798 he married Antoinette of Saxe-Coburg-Saalfeld (1779–1824). They had five children:

- Marie of Württemberg (1799–1860), who in 1832 married Ernest I of Saxe-Coburg-Gotha.
- Paul Karl Alexander Konstantin of Württemberg (1800–1801)
- Alexander of Württemberg (1804–1881), Duke of Württemberg
- Ernest of Württemberg (1807–1868), Duke of Württemberg, who in 1860 married Natalie Eschborn, later ennobled as "von Grünhof" (1836–1905) :
  - Alexandra Nathalie Ernestine von Grünhof (Wiesbaden, 10 August 1861– Hohenlübbichow, 13 April 1933), who in 1883 married Robert von Keudell
- Friedrich Wilhelm Ferdinand of Württemberg (Saint Petersburg 29 April 1810– Saint Petersburg, 25 April 1815)

=== Descendants ===
Alexander of Württemberg was the founder of the fifth branch (called the ducal branch) of the House of Württemberg, as the seventh son of Frederick II Eugene, Duke of Württemberg. On the extinction of the eldest branch in 1921, the ducal branch became the new dynastic-branch of the House. (The House of Württemberg's two morganatic branches - the dukes of Teck (extinct in the male line in 1981), and the morganatic branch of the dukes of Urach - were technically 'older' than the Ducal branch, but ineligible to succeed).

Alexander of Württemberg is the direct ancestor of the present claimant to the dukedom of Württemberg, Wilhelm.

== Military service ==
=== Austria ===
Alexander began service in the Württemberg army as a colonel on 21 April 1791, and transferred to the Austrian army, serving during the campaign against France in 1796–1799, and participating in the battles of Rastadt, Würtzburg, Offenbach, Stockach and Zurich. In 1796 Prince Alexander became a Major General and a Fieldmarshal Lieutenant in the Austrian army in 1798.

=== Russia ===
In that year he met Alexander Suvorov, and took up his recommendation to join the Imperial Russian Army as a Lieutenant General and chief of the Riga Cuirassier Regiment which in August 1800 was reorganised into Riga Dragoon Regiment while Alexander was promoted to General of Cavalry (the rank below Field Marshal). In 1811 he was appointed Military Governor of Belorussia.

During the 1812 Campaign Württemberg served at the Headquarters of the 1st Western Army and fought at Vitebsk, Smolensk, Borodino, Tarutino (awarded Order of St. George, 3rd class), Maloyaroslavets, Vyazma and Krasnoi. In 1813 he commanded the Siege of Danzig for which he was awarded a golden sword and the Order of St. George (2nd class). After the war he returned to Belorussia and his Riga Regiment.

In 1822 he became the Head of the Communications Department (responsible for transport links) and initiated several large-scale waterway projects (the Windawski Canal, etc.) in western Russia. In 1826 Württemberg was appointed chief of Ekaterinoslav Cuirassier Regiment, and a member of the State Council, but returned to the Riga Dragoons in 1827. In 1832 he resigned from military service and left Russia on 24 November, never to return.

== Awards and decorations ==
- Württemberg:
  - Knight of the Golden Eagle
  - Commander of the Military Merit Order, 2nd Class, 1799
- Russian Empire:
  - Gold Sword for Bravery, inscribed "For capture of Danzig"
  - Knight of St. Andrew, in Diamonds, 28 June 1798
  - Knight of St. Alexander Nevsky, 28 June 1798
  - Knight of St. Anne, 1st Class, 28 June 1798
  - Grand Commander of St. John, 28 June 1798
  - Knight of St. George, 3rd Class, 1812; 2nd Class, 12 November 1813
  - Knight of St. Vladimir, 1st Class, 25 February 1813
- Kingdom of Prussia:
  - Knight of the Black Eagle, 15 January 1814
  - Knight of the Red Eagle, 2nd Class
- Kingdom of Bavaria: Order of Maximilian Joseph
- Sovereign Military Order of Malta: Bailiff Grand Cross

== See also ==
- Karl Alexander, Duke of Württemberg (his paternal grandfather)
- Frederick William of Brandenburg-Schwedt (his maternal grandfather)

== Ancestry ==
Ancestors of Duke Alexander of Württemberg (1771–1833)

8. Frederick Charles, Duke of Württemberg-Winnental
4. Charles Alexander, Duke of Württemberg
9. Margravine Eleonore Juliane of Brandenburg-Ansbach
2. Frederick II Eugene, Duke of Württemberg
10. Anselm Franz, Prince of Thurn and Taxis
5. Princess Marie Auguste of Thurn and Taxis
11. Princess Maria Ludovika of Lobkowicz
1. Duke Alexander of Württemberg
12. Philip William, Margrave of Brandenburg-Schwedt
6. Frederick William, Margrave of Brandenburg-Schwedt
13. Princess Johanna Charlotte of Anhalt-Dessau
3. Princess Friederike of Brandenburg-Schwedt
14. Frederick William I of Prussia
7. Princess Sophia Dorothea of Prussia
15. Princess Sophia Dorothea of Hanover

== Notes ==
- Mikaberidze, Alexander, The Russian officer Corps in the Revolutionary and Napoleonic wars 1792-1815, Savas Beatie, New York, 2005
