= Princess Sophie Antoinette of Brunswick-Wolfenbüttel =

Duchess consort of Saxe-Coburg-Saalfeld from 1764 to 1800

Sophie Antoinette
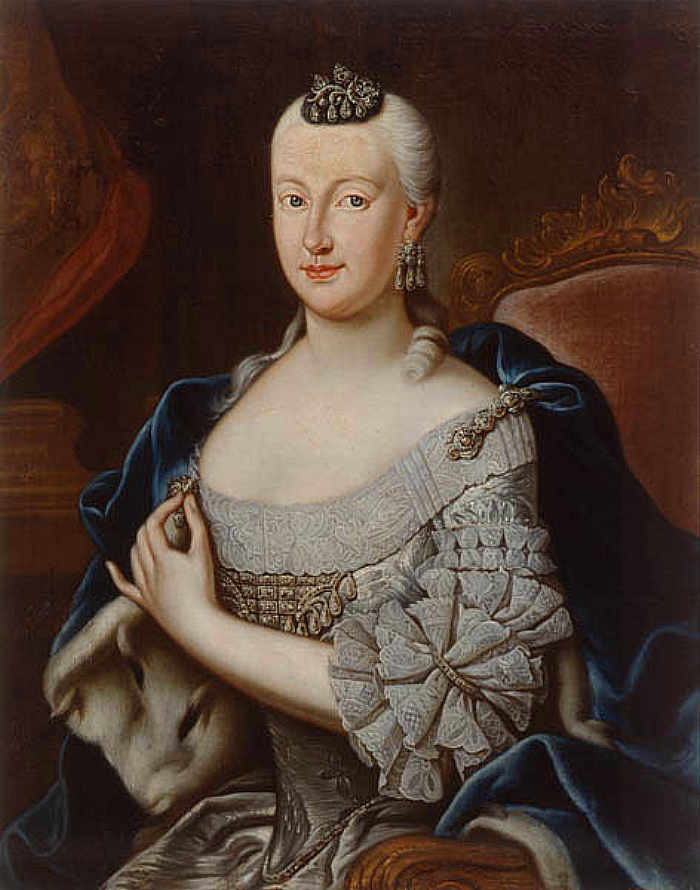

Duchess consort of Saxe-Coburg-Saalfeld
- Tenure: 16 September 1764 – 8 September 1800
- Born: 13 January 1724; Wolfenbüttel
- Died: 17 May 1802 (aged 78); Coburg
- Spouse: Ernest Frederick, Duke of Saxe-Coburg-Saalfeld (m. 1749; died 1800)
- Issue Detail: Francis, Duke of Saxe-Coburg-Saalfeld; Prince Karl Wilhelm; Princess Caroline; Prince Ludwig Karl
- House: Welf (by birth); Wettin (Ernestine Line) (by marriage)
- Father: Ferdinand Albert II, Duke of Brunswick-Lüneburg
- Mother: Antoinette Amelie of Brunswick-Lüneburg

Sophie Antoinette of Brunswick-Wolfenbüttel (13/23 January 1724 – 17 May 1802) was the Duchess Consort of Saxe-Coburg-Saalfeld.

== Early life and ancestry ==
Born into the House of Welf, ruling family of the Principality of Brunswick-Wolfenbüttel, Sophie Antoinette was born as the eight of thirteen children to Ferdinand Albert II, Duke of Brunswick-Lüneburg and his wife, Princess Antoinette of Brunswick-Wolfenbüttel, younger sister of Empress Elisabeth Christine, mother of Empress Maria Theresa.

== Marriage and issue ==
Sophie Antoinette married Ernest Frederick, Duke of Saxe-Coburg-Saalfeld, member of the Ernestine line of the House of Wettin, on 23 April 1749 at Wolfenbüttel.

She had the following children:

1. Franz Frederick Anton, Duke of Saxe-Coburg-Saalfeld (b. Coburg 15 July 1750- d. Coburg, 9 December 1806), father of Leopold I of Belgium and grandfather of Leopold II of Belgium, Ferdinand II of Portugal, Empress Carlota of Mexico, Victoria of the United Kingdom, and Victoria's husband Prince Albert.
2. Karl Wilhelm Ferdinand (b. Coburg, 21 November 1751- d. Coburg, 16 February 1757).
3. Fredericka Juliane (b. Coburg, 14 September 1752 - d. Coburg, 24 September 1752).
4. Caroline Ulrike Amalie (b. Coburg, 19 October 1753 - d. Coburg, 1 October 1829), a nun at Gandersheim.
5. Ludwig Karl Frederick (b. Coburg, 2 January 1755 - d. Coburg, 4 May 1806); he had an illegitimate son by a Mademoiselle Brutel de la Riviére: Ludwig Frederick Emil of Coburg (b. Hildburghausen, 1779 - d. Coburg, 1827). In turn, the five children of Ludwig Frederick were created Freiherren von Coburg. His descendants still live.
6. Ferdinand August Heinrich (b. Coburg, 12 April 1756 - d. Coburg, 8 July 1758).
7. Frederick (b. Coburg, 4 March 1758 - d. Coburg, 26 June 1758).

== Death ==
Sophie Antoinette died on 17 May 1802, in Coburg, Saxe-Coburg-Saalfeld, Holy Roman Empire, aged 78, outliving her husband by almost two years. Her body was interred, alongside Ernest Frederick, in the Morizkirche, Coburg, Germany.

== Ancestry ==
Ancestors of Princess Sophie Antoinette of Brunswick-Wolfenbüttel

8. Augustus II, Duke of Brunswick
4. Ferdinand Albert I, Duke of Brunswick-Wolfenbüttel-Bevern
9. Duchess Elisabeth Sophie of Mecklenburg
2. Ferdinand Albert II, Duke of Brunswick-Wolfenbüttel
10. Frederick, Landgrave of Hesse-Eschwege
5. Princess Christine of Hesse-Eschwege
11. Countess Palatine Eleonora Catherine of Zweibrücken
1. Duchess Sophie Antoinette of Brunswick-Wolfenbüttel
12. Anthony Ulrich, Duke of Brunswick
6. Louis Rudolph, Duke of Brunswick
13. Princess Elisabeth Juliane of Schleswig-Holstein-Sonderburg-Norburg
3. Princess Antoinette of Brunswick-Wolfenbüttel
14. Albert Ernest I, Prince of Oettingen-Oettingen
7. Princess Christine Louise of Oettingen-Oettingen
15. Duchess Christine Friederike of Württemberg

Princess Sophie Antoinette of Brunswick-Wolfenbüttel House of Brunswick-Bevern Cadet branch of the House of Welf Born: 13 January 1724 Died: 17 May 1802
German royalty
Preceded by Anna Sophie of Schwarzburg-Rudolstadt	Duchess consort of Saxe-Coburg-Saalfeld; 16 September 1764 – 8 September 1800	Succeeded by Augusta Reuss of Ebersdorf
