= Prince Ferdinand of Saxe-Coburg and Gotha =

Prince Ferdinand
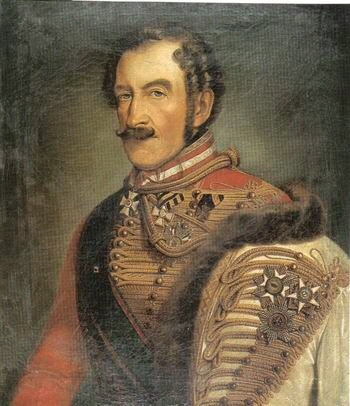
- 19th-century portrait of Ferdinand

Head of the House of Saxe-Coburg and Gotha-Koháry
- Tenure: 27 June 1826 – 27 August 1851
- Successor: Prince August
- Born: Prince Ferdinand of Saxe-Coburg-Saalfeld; 28 March 1785; Coburg
- Died: 27 August 1851 (aged 66); Vienna
- Burial: Mausoleum at Friedhof am Glockenberg, Coburg
- Spouse: Princess Maria Antonia Koháry of Csábrág and Szitnya (m. 1815)
- Issue: Ferdinand II of Portugal; Prince August; Princess Victoria, Duchess of Nemours; Prince Leopold
Names
- Ferdinand Georg August
- House: Saxe-Coburg-Saalfeld (1785–1826); Saxe-Coburg and Gotha-Koháry (1826–1851)
- Father: Francis, Duke of Saxe-Coburg-Saalfeld
- Mother: Countess Augusta Reuss of Ebersdorf
- Military career
- Branch: Army of the Holy Roman Empire
- Service years: 1791–1828
- Rank: General of the cavalry
- Commands: Inhaber of the Husaren-Regiment Nr. 8.
- Conflicts: War of the Fifth Coalition; War of the Sixth Coalition

Prince Ferdinand Georg August of Saxe-Coburg and Gotha (28 March 1785 – 27 August 1851) was a German prince of the House of Saxe-Coburg and Gotha and a general of cavalry in the Austrian Imperial and Royal Army during the Napoleonic Wars. Initially remaining a Lutheran until 1818, by marriage he established the Catholic branch of the family, which eventually gained the thrones of Portugal (1837) and Bulgaria (1887).

== Birth and family ==
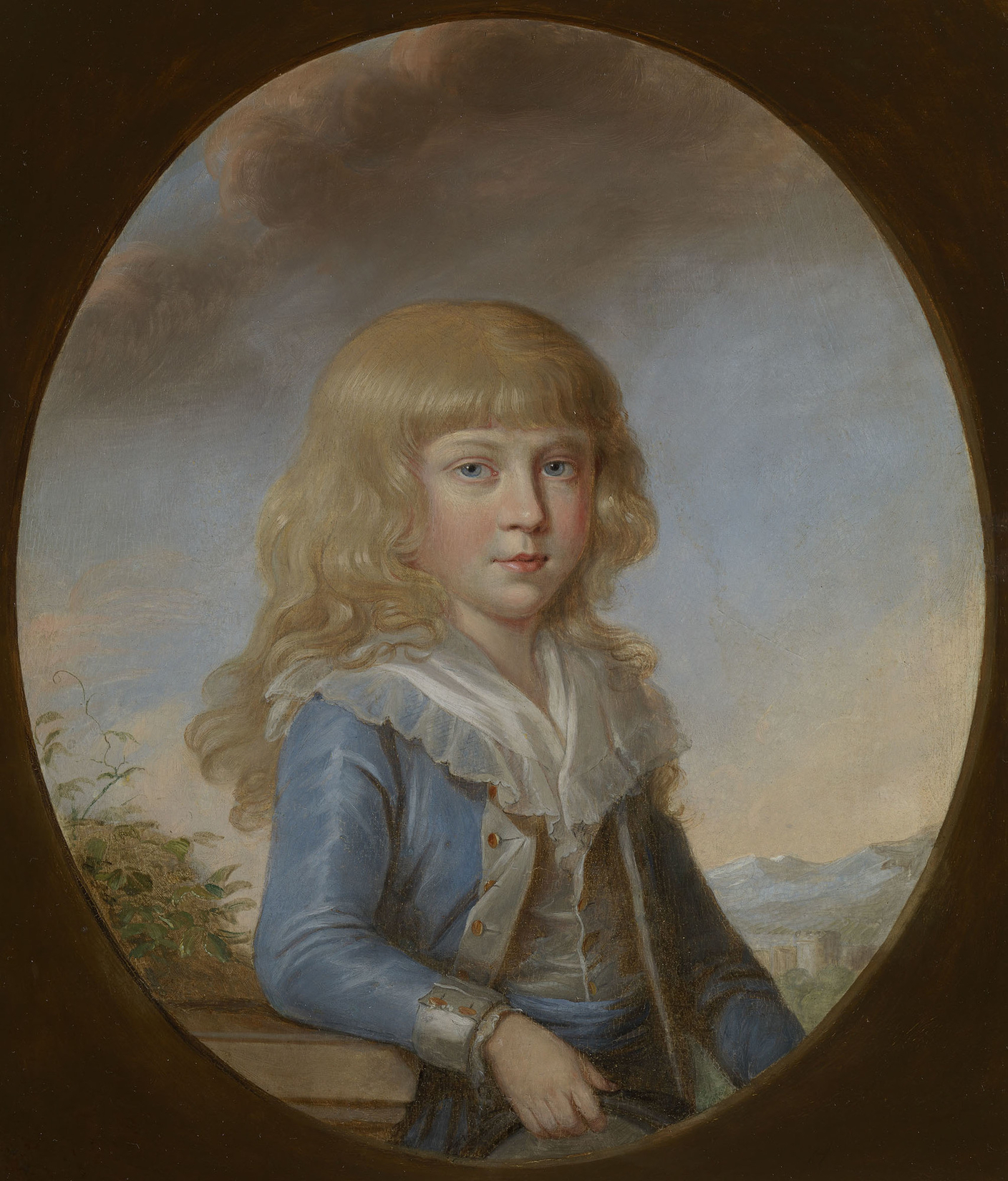
Portrait of a young Prince Ferdinand by Herbert Smith after Johann Heinrich Schröder, 1844

Ferdinand was born at Coburg as Prince Ferdinand Georg August of Saxe-Coburg-Saalfeld, the second son of Francis Frederick Anthony, Duke of Saxe-Coburg-Saalfeld by his second wife, Countess Augusta Caroline Sophie Reuss of Ebersdorf. In 1826 his title changed from Prince of Saxe-Coburg-Saalfeld to Prince of Saxe-Coburg and Gotha, when his brother Duke Ernst I made a territorial exchange with other members of the family.

Ferdinand's nephews and nieces included Queen Victoria of the United Kingdom and her husband Prince Albert, as well as Empress Carlota of Mexico and her brother King Leopold II of Belgium.

== Military career ==
=== French Revolutionary Wars ===
On 10 December 1791, during the French Revolutionary Wars, Ferdinand was commissioned as Unterleutnant in the Dragoon-Regiment Coburg Nr. 6. He was promoted to Oberleutnant on 1 March 1796 and to Second-Rittmeister on 18 November 1798.

=== Napoleonic Wars ===
On 1 February 1802 he transferred to the Austrian Army serving in the Chevauxleger-Regiment Fürst Rosenberg in which he was promoted to major on 29 September 1804. On 1 January 1805 he transferred to the Husaren-Regiment Graf Blankenstein Nr. 6 in which he was promoted to Oberstleutnant on 6 August 1805.

==== War of the Fifth Coalition ====
On 15 September 1808 Ferdinand became Oberst in the Husaren-Regiment Erzherzog Ferdinand d'Este Nr. 3. It was in this regiment that he served in the War of the Fifth Coalition under Field Marshal Prince Hohenzollern. He received the knight's cross of the Military Order of Maria Theresa. For his services in the Battle of Wagram he was praised by his corps commander Fürst Liechtenstein. On 15 April 1811 he was named Generalmajor.

==== War of the Sixth Coalition ====
During the War of the Sixth Coalition, Ferdinand fought at the battles of Kulm and Leipzig.

=== Concert of Europe ===
On 8 May 1822 Ferdinand became Inhaber (proprietor) of the k.u.k. Ulanenregiment „Fürst zu Schwarzenberg“ Nr. 2 On 22 November 1828 he became Inhaber of the Husaren-Regiment Nr. 8. Shortly thereafter, he was promoted to the rank of General der Kavallerie.

== Marriage and children ==
In Vienna on 30 November 1815, Ferdinand married Princess Maria Antonia Koháry of Csábrág and Szitnya, daughter and sole heiress of Ferenc József, Prince Koháry de Csábrág et Szitnya, converting to Roman Catholicism in 1818. When Antonia's father died in 1826, she inherited his estates in Hungary, and Ferdinand took the title of Duke of Saxe-Coburg and Gotha-Koháry.

Ferdinand and Antonia had four children, all of whom were raised Catholic:

- Ferdinand II of Portugal (29 October 1816 – 15 December 1885), married Queen Maria II of Portugal on 9 April 1836. They had eleven children. He remarried Elisa Hensler on 10 June 1869.
- Prince August of Saxe-Coburg and Gotha (13 June 1818 – 26 July 1881), married Princess Clémentine of Orléans on 21 April 1843. They had five children, including king Ferdinand I of Bulgaria (their youngest child).
- Princess Victoria of Saxe-Coburg and Gotha (14 February 1822 – 10 December 1857), married Prince Louis, Duke of Nemours on 27 April 1840. They had four children.
- Prince Leopold of Saxe-Coburg and Gotha (31 January 1824 – 20 May 1884), married morganatically Constanze Geiger on 23 April 1861. They had one son.

== Death ==
Ferdinand died at Vienna on 27 August 1851 at the age of 66. He is buried in the ducal mausoleum at Friedhof am Glockenberg in Coburg.

== Honours and awards ==
He received the following awards:

- Russian Empire:
  - Knight of St. Andrew, 30 August 1808
  - Knight of St. Alexander Nevsky, 30 August 1808
  - Knight of St. George, 4th Class, 9 September 1813
- Austrian Empire: Knight of the Military Order of Maria Theresa, 1809; Commander, 1815
- Kingdom of Saxony: Knight of the Rue Crown, 1815
- Kingdom of Hanover: Grand Cross of the Royal Guelphic Order, 1818
- (Saxe-Coburg and Gotha) (Duchy of Saxe-Altenburg) (Saxe-Meiningen) Ernestine duchies: Grand Cross of the Saxe-Ernestine House Order, December 1833
- Belgium: Grand Cordon of the Order of Leopold, 15 July 1835
- Kingdom of Portugal:
  - Grand Cross of the Royal Military Order of Our Lord Jesus Christ, 9 December 1835
  - Grand Cross of the Tower and Sword, 23 April 1836
- United Kingdom: Honorary Grand Cross of the Bath (military), 12 June 1839
- Kingdom of France: Grand Cross of the Legion of Honour, May 1840
- Baden:
  - Knight of the House Order of Fidelity, 1843
  - Grand Cross of the Zähringer Lion, 1843
- Kingdom of Prussia: Knight of the Red Eagle, 1st Class

== Ancestry ==
Ancestors of Prince Ferdinand of Saxe-Coburg and Gotha

8. Francis Josias, Duke of Saxe-Coburg-Saalfeld
4. Ernest Frederick, Duke of Saxe-Coburg-Saalfeld
9. Princess Anna Sophie of Schwarzburg-Rudolstadt
2. Francis, Duke of Saxe-Coburg-Saalfeld
10. Ferdinand Albert II, Duke of Brunswick-Wolfenbüttel
5. Duchess Sophie Antoinette of Brunswick-Wolfenbüttel
11. Duchess Antoinette of Brunswick-Wolfenbüttel
1. Ferdinand, Prince of Saxe-Coburg and Gotha-Koháry
12. Heinrich XXIX, Count Reuss of Ebersdorf
6. Heinrich XXIV, Count Reuss of Ebersdorf
13. Countess Sophie Theodora of Castell-Remlingen
3. Countess Augusta Reuss of Ebersdorf
14. George August, Count of Erbach-Schönberg
7. Countess Karoline Ernestine of Erbach-Schönberg
15. Countess Ferdinande Henriette of Stolberg-Gedern

== Bibliography ==
- Biographisches Lexikon des Kaisertums Österreich, II, 392–394.
