= Countess Karoline Ernestine of Erbach-Schönberg =

Countess of Erbach-Schönberg

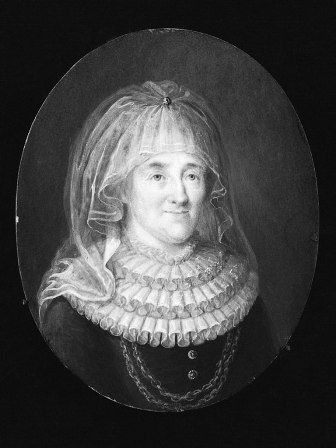
- Born: 20 August 1727; Gedern
- Died: 22 April 1796 (aged 68); Ebersdorf
- Spouse: Heinrich XXIV, Count Reuss of Ebersdorf (m. 1754; died 1779)
- Issue: Augusta, Duchess of Saxe-Coburg-Saalfeld
- Father: George August, Count of Erbach-Schönberg
- Mother: Ferdinande Henriette, Countess of Stolberg-Gedern

Countess Karoline Ernestine of Erbach-Schönberg, born 20 August 1727 (20 July, according to other sources) at Gedern, Oberhessen, Hesse-Darmstadt, in the then Holy Roman Empire, was a daughter of George August, Count of Erbach-Schönberg, and Ferdinande Henriette, Countess of Stolberg-Gedern. She died at Ebersdorf, Thuringia, on 22 April 1796, at age 68.

== Family ==
She married Heinrich XXIV, Count Reuss of Ebersdorf, on 28 June 1754 at Thurnau, Bavaria, and had seven children, all of them born at Ebersdorf, Reuss-Jüngere-Linie, Thüringia.

She is an ancestor of many royals, including Queen Victoria, her husband and first cousin Prince Albert, their son King Edward VII, and thus King Charles III.

Name	Birth	Death	Spouse	Children
Heinrich XLVI, Count Reuss of Ebersdorf	14 May 1755	18 April 1757		
Countess Augusta Reuss of Ebersdorf	19 January 1757, Ebersdorf	16 November 1831, Ebersdorf	Duke Franz of Saxe-Coburg-Saalfeld	Princess Sophie of Saxe-Coburg-Saalfeld; Princess Antoinette of Saxe-Coburg-Saalfeld; Princess Juliane of Saxe-Coburg-Saalfeld; Ernest I, Duke of Saxe-Coburg and Gotha; Prince Ferdinand of Saxe-Coburg and Gotha; Princess Marianne; Leopold I of Belgium; Prince Francis Maximilian; Princess Victoria of Saxe-Coburg-Saalfeld (mother of Victoria of the United Kingdom)
Countess Louise Christine Reuss of Ebersdorf	2 June 1759, Ebersdorf	5 December 1840, Lobenstein	Prince Heinrich XLIII of Reuss-Köstritz	
Heinrich LI, Prince Reuss of Ebersdorf	16 May 1761, Ebersdorf	10 July 1822, Ebersdorf		Heinrich LXXII, Prince Reuss of Lobenstein and Ebersdorf; Princess Adelheid Reuss of Ebersdorf (wife of Heinrich LXVII, Prince Reuss Younger Line)
Countess Ernestine Ferdinande Reuss of Ebersdorf	28 April 1762, Ebersdorf	19 May 1763, Ebersdorf		
Heinrich LIII, Count Reuss of Ebersdorf	24 May 1765, Ebersdorf	28 June 1770, Ebersdorf		
Countess Henriette Reuss of Ebersdorf	9 May 1767, Ebersdorf	3 September 1801, Coburg	Emich Carl, 2nd Prince of Leiningen	Prince Friedrich Karl Heinrich Ludwig of Leiningen

== Ancestry ==
Ancestors of Countess Karoline Ernestine of Erbach-Schönberg

8. George Albert I, Count of Erbach-Schönberg
4. George Albert II, Count of Erbach-Fürstenau
9. Elisabeth Dorothea of Hohenlohe-Schillingsfürst
2. George August, Count of Erbach-Schönberg
10. Philip Gottfried, Count of Hohenlohe-Waldenburg
5. Anna Dorothea, Countess of Hohenlohe-Waldenburg
11. Anna Christine Schenkin of Limpurg
1. Countess Karoline Ernestine of Erbach-Schönberg
12. Heinrich Ernst, Count of Stolberg-Gedern
6. Louis Christian, Count of Stolberg-Gedern
13. Anna Elisabeth, Countess of Stolberg
3. Ferdinande Henriette, Countess of Stolberg-Gedern
14. Gustav Adolph, Duke of Mecklenburg-Güstrow
7. Princess Christine of Mecklenburg-Güstrow
15. Magdalene Sibylle of Holstein-Gottorp
