= Princess Juliane of Saxe-Coburg-Saalfeld =

Grand Duchess Anna Feodorovna of Russia

- Grand Duchess Anna Feodorovna of Russia
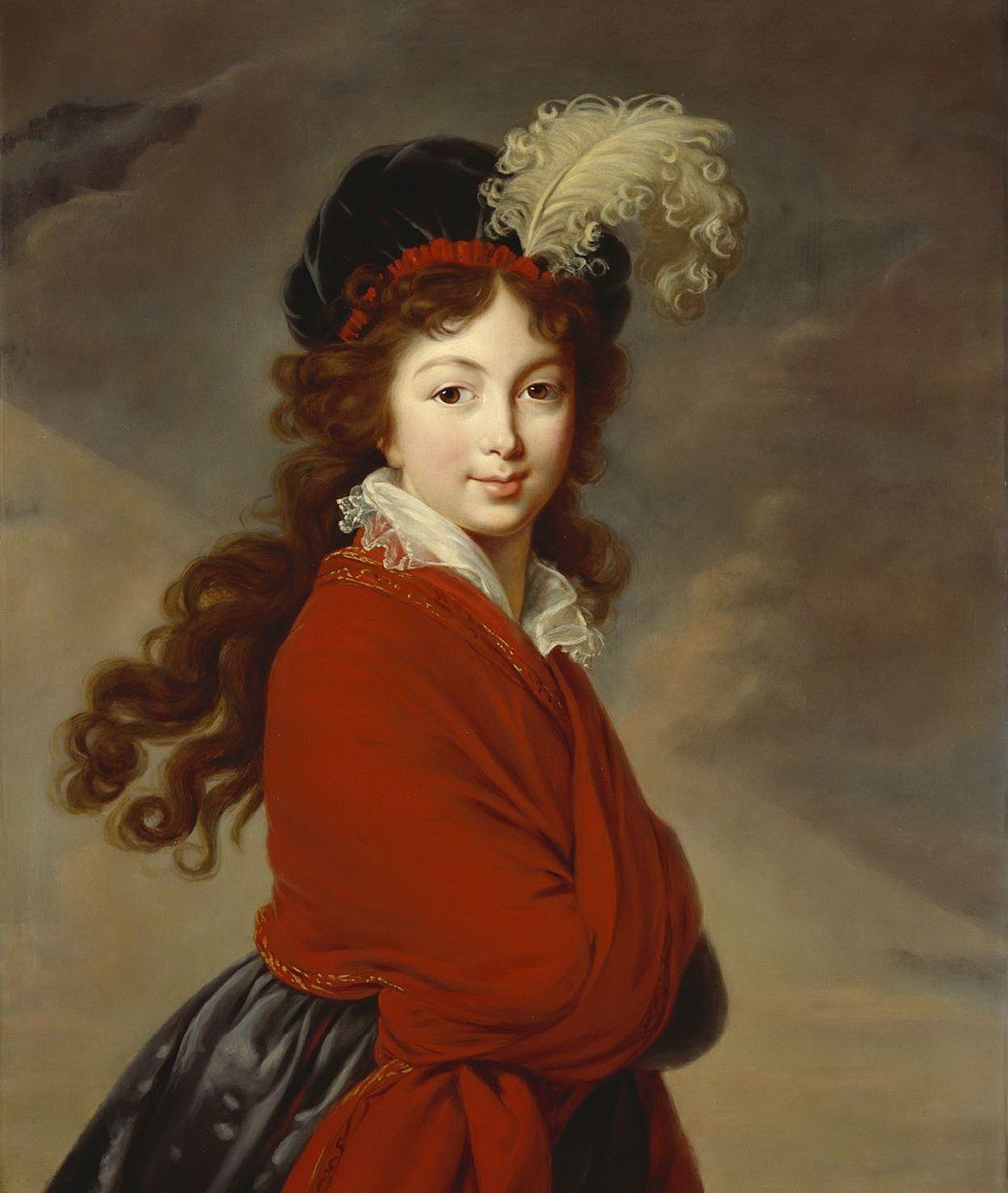
- La Grande Duchesse Anna Feodorovna, Portrait by Élisabeth-Louise Vigée-Le Brun, painted shortly after her wedding (c. 1795-1796). This portrait, originally thought to have been destroyed during WW2, is located at the Pushkin State Museum of Fine Arts, in Moscow.
- Born: 23 September 1781; Coburg, Thuringia, Duchy of Saxe-Coburg-Saalfeld
- Died: 12 August 1860 (aged 78); Elfenau, near Bern, Switzerland
- Burial: Schosshalden cemetery
- Spouse: Grand Duke Konstantin Pavlovich of Russia (m. 1796; ann. 1820)
- Illegitimate children: Eduard Edgar Schmidt-Löwe; Louise Hilda Aglaë d'Aubert
Names
- Juliane Henriette Ulrike
- House: Saxe-Coburg-Saalfeld (until 1826); Saxe-Coburg and Gotha (from 1826)
- Father: Francis, Duke of Saxe-Coburg-Saalfeld
- Mother: Countess Augusta Reuss of Ebersdorf

Princess Juliane of Saxe-Coburg-Saalfeld (23 September 1781 – 12 August 1860), also known as Grand Duchess Anna Feodorovna of Russia (Russian: Анна Фёдоровна), was a German princess of the ducal house of Saxe-Coburg-Saalfeld (after 1826, the house of Saxe-Coburg-Gotha) who became the wife of Grand Duke Konstantin Pavlovich of Russia.

== Family ==
Juliane was the third daughter of Franz Frederick Anton, Duke of Saxe-Coburg-Saalfeld by his second wife, Countess Augusta Caroline Reuss of Ebersdorf. She was named in honour of her grand-aunt, Queen Juliane Marie of Denmark, who was her paternal grandmother's sister. King Leopold I of the Belgians was her younger brother, while Queen Victoria of United Kingdom was her niece and King Ferdinand II of Portugal was her nephew, as were Queen Victoria's husband, Prince Albert, and Leopold II of Belgium.

== Grand Duchess of Russia ==
=== Marriage plans ===
Empress Catherine II of Russia began to search for a suitable wife for her second grandson, Grand Duke Konstantin, after the marriage of her eldest grandson, Grand Duke Alexander, to Louise of Baden in 1793. The empress spoke with pride of Konstantin as an enviable match for many brides in Europe, as he was the second in the line of succession to the Russian Empire.

Soon a marriage offer arrived from the court of Naples: King Ferdinand I and Queen Maria Carolina suggested a marriage between the Grand Duke and one of their many daughters, which the Empress immediately rejected.

In 1795, Empress Catherine sent her general Andreas Eberhard von Budberg in a secret mission to the ruling European courts, to find a bride for Konstantin. He had a huge list of candidates, but during his trip became ill and was forced to stay in Coburg.

He was attended by the Ducal court doctor, Baron Stockmar, who, once he knew the real intention of his trip, drew the general's attention to the daughters of Duke Franz. Budberg wrote to Saint Petersburg that he found the perfect candidates, without visiting any other courts.

After a little consideration, Catherine consented. Duchess Augusta, once she knew that one of her daughters would be a grand duchess of Russia, was delighted with the idea: a marriage with the Imperial Russian dynasty could bring huge benefits for the relatively small German Duchy of Saxe-Coburg-Saalfeld.

However, in Europe there were other views; for example, Charles-François-Philibert Masson, in his Secrets Memoirs of the court of Saint-Petersburg wrote about the unenviable role of German brides in the Russian court:

Young touching victim, which Germany sends as a tribute to Russia, as did Greece who sent their maids to the Minotaur...

=== Life in Russia ===
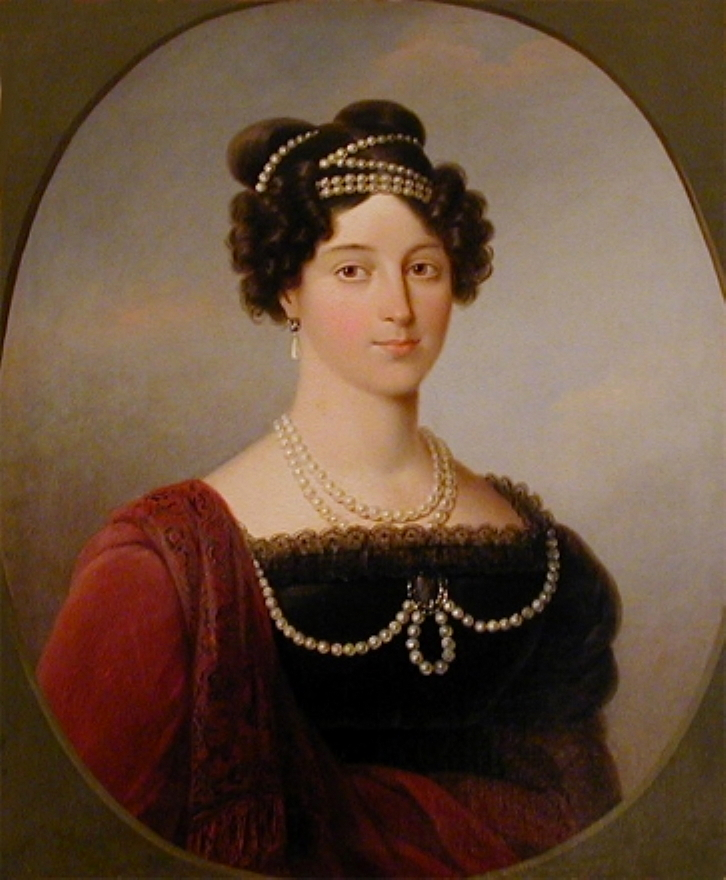
Grand Duchess Anna Feodorovna of Russia, early 1800s

Juliane, along with her mother and two elder sisters, Sophie and Antoinette, travelled to Saint Petersburg at the request of Empress Catherine II of Russia. After the first meeting, the Empress wrote: "The Duchess of Saxe-Coburg was beautiful and worthy of respect among women, and her daughters are pretty. It's a pity that our groom must choose only one, would be good to keep all three. But it seems that our Paris give the apple to the younger one, you'll see that he would prefer Juliane among the sisters...she's really the best choice." However, Prince Adam Czartoryski, in his Memoirs, wrote:

He was given an order by the Empress to marry one of the princesses, and he was given a choice of his future wife.

This point of view was confirmed by Countess Varvara Golovina, who also wrote:

After three weeks, the Grand Duke Konstantin was forced to make a choice. I think that he did not want to marry.

Constantine himself would say about his choice "if it must be so. I will marry the little ape; it dances very prettily."

After the young grand duke chose Juliane, she began her training as a consort. On 2 February 1796, the 14-year-old German princess took the name of Anna Feodorovna in a Russian Orthodox baptismal ceremony and 24 days later, on 26 February, she and Konstantin were married. The Empress died nine months later, on 6 November. By virtue of her wedding, Anna was awarded with the Grand Cross of the Imperial Order of Saint Catherine and the Order of Saint John of Jerusalem.

This union, in connection with the wedding of Anna's brother Leopold and Princess Charlotte Augusta of Wales, made the little Duchy of Saxe-Coburg the dynastic heart of Europe. In addition, thanks to relations with the Russian Empire, Saxe-Coburg was relatively safe during the Napoleonic Wars. However, on a personal level, the marriage was deeply unhappy. Konstantin, known to be a violent man and fully dedicated to his military career, made Anna intensely miserable.

In the meanwhile, the young grand duchess began to grow up and became more and more attractive to the Russian court, who nicknamed her the "Rising Star". This made Konstantin extremely jealous, even of his own brother Alexander. He forbade Anna to leave her room, and when she had the opportunity to come out, Konstantin took her away. Countess Golovina recalled: The married life of Anna Fyodorovna was hard and impossible to maintain [...] in her modesty, she needed the friendship of Elizabeth Alexeievna (Louise of Baden, wife of her brother-in-law Alexander), who was able to smooth things out between the frequent quarrelling spouses...". During the difficult years in the Russian court, Anna became close to Grand Duchess Elizabeth, of similar age.

In 1799 Anna left Russia for medical treatment and didn't want to return. She went to her family in Coburg; however, they didn't support her, as they feared for the reputation of the Ducal family and their finances. Anna left Coburg to have a water cure; but at the same time, the St Petersburg's court made their own plans. Under the pressure of the Imperial family and her own relatives, the Grand Duchess was forced to return to Russia. In October 1799 the weddings of Grand Duchesses Alexandra and Elena were celebrated. Anna was forced to attend.

The assassination of Emperor Paul I on 23 March 1801 gave Anna an opportunity to carry out her plan to escape. By August of that year, her mother was informed that the grand duchess was seriously ill. Once informed about her daughter's health, Duchess Augusta came to visit her. In order to have a better treatment she took Anna to Coburg, with the consent of both the new Emperor Alexander I and Grand Duke Konstantin. Once she arrived to her homeland, Anna refused to come back. She never returned to Russia.

== Life after separation ==
Almost immediately after her return to Coburg, Anna began negotiations for a divorce from her husband. Grand Duke Konstantin wrote in response to her letter:

You write to me that I allowed you to go into foreign lands because we are incompatible and because I can't give you the love which you need. But humbly I ask you to calm yourself in consideration to our lives together, besides all these facts confirm in writing, and that in addition to this other reason you don't have.

By 1803 the divorce was still refused, because Dowager Empress Maria Fyodorovna feared that her son Konstantin could contract a second morganatic marriage, and the official separation would damage the reputation of the grand duchess.

At first, Anna feared an unfavorable opinion about her conduct among the European courts; however, they showed their sympathy. Still legally married, Anna, eager to have a family, found solace in clandestine affairs.

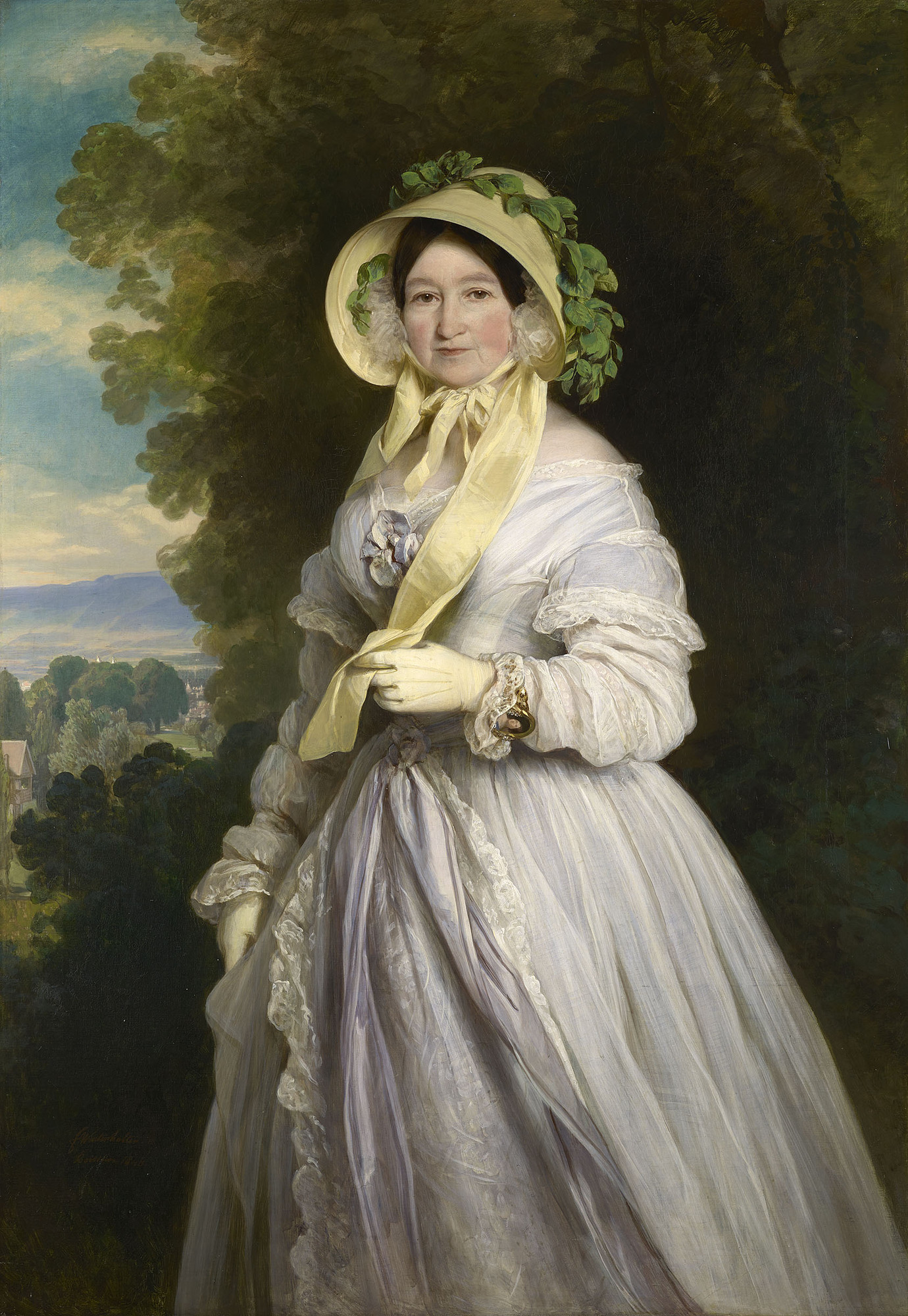
Grand Duchess Anna Fyodorovna. Portrait by Franz Xaver Winterhalter, 1848.

On 28 October 1808, Anna gave birth to an illegitimate son, Eduard Edgar Schmidt-Löwe. The father of this child may have been Jules Gabriel Émile de Seigneux, a minor Swiss nobleman and officer in the Prussian army. de Seigneux, however, turned out to be as controlling as her husband and the relationship ended.

Eduard was ennobled by his mother's younger brother, Ernst I, Duke of Saxe-Coburg and Gotha, and assumed the surname von Löwenfels by decree on 18 February 1818.

Later, Anna moved to Bern, Switzerland, and gave birth to a second illegitimate child in 1812, a daughter named Louise Hilda Aglaë d'Aubert. The father was Rodolphe Abraham de Schiferli, a Swiss surgeon, professor and chamberlain of Anna's household from 1812 to 1837 and who had advised her during her first pregnancy.

As de Schiferli was a married man and in order to cover another scandal in Anna's life, the baby was adopted by Jean François Joseph d'Aubert, a French refugee. After the affair ended, Schiferli maintained a tender and close friendship with Anna until his death.

Two years later, in 1814, during the invasion of France by Russian troops, Emperor Alexander I expressed his desire of a reconciliation between his brother and Anna. Grand Duke Konstantin, accompanied by Anna's brother Leopold, tried to convince her to return with him, but the grand duchess categorically refused. That year, Anna acquired an estate on the banks of Aare River and gave it the name of Elfenau. She spent the rest of her life there, and, as a lover of music, made her home not only a center for domestic and foreign musical society of the era but also the point of reunion of diplomats from different countries who were in Bern.

Finally, on 20 March 1820, after 19 years of separation, Anna's marriage was officially annulled by a manifesto of Emperor Alexander I of Russia. Grand Duke Konstantin remarried two months later morganatically with his mistress Countess Joanna Grudzińska and died on 27 June 1831. Anna survived her former husband by 29 years.

In 1835, Anna's son Eduard married his cousin Bertha von Schauenstein, an illegitimate daughter of Ernest I, Duke of Saxe-Coburg and Gotha. This was one of the few happy events in Anna's last years - she soon lost almost all the people she loved: her parents, her sisters Sophie and Antoinette, her own daughter Louise (who, married Jean Samuel Edouard Dapples in 1834 died three years later in 1837 at the age of twenty-five), her former lover and now good friend Rodolphe de Schiferli (just a few weeks after their daughter's demise), her protector Emperor Alexander I, her childhood friend Empress Elizabeth...at that point the Grand Duchess wrote that Elfenau became the House of Mourning.

Anna Fyodorovna died in her Elfenau estate in 1860, aged 78. In her grave was placed a simple marble slab with the inscription, "Julia-Anna" and the dates of her birth and death (1781-1860); nothing more would indicate the origin of the once Princess of Saxe-Coburg and Grand Duchess of Russia. Through the five children of her son Eduard she has many descendants.

Anna's niece-in-law Princess Alexandrine of Baden wrote:

Condolences must be universal, because Aunt was extremely loved and respected, because much involved in charity work and in favor of the poor and underprivileged.

== Ancestry ==
Ancestors of Princess Juliane of Saxe-Coburg-Saalfeld

8. Francis Josias, Duke of Saxe-Coburg-Saalfeld
4. Ernest Frederick, Duke of Saxe-Coburg-Saalfeld
9. Princess Anna Sophie of Schwarzburg-Rudolstadt
2. Francis, Duke of Saxe-Coburg-Saalfeld
10. Ferdinand Albert II, Duke of Brunswick-Wolfenbüttel
5. Duchess Sophie Antoinette of Brunswick-Wolfenbüttel
11. Duchess Antoinette of Brunswick-Wolfenbüttel
1. Princess Juliane of Saxe-Coburg-Saalfeld
12. Heinrich XXIX, Count Reuss of Ebersdorf
6. Heinrich XXIV, Count Reuss of Ebersdorf
13. Countess Sophie Theodora of Castell-Remlingen
3. Countess Augusta Reuss of Ebersdorf
14. George August, Count of Erbach-Schönberg
7. Countess Karoline Ernestine of Erbach-Schönberg
15. Countess Ferdinande Henriette of Stolberg-Gedern

== Bibliography ==
- Alville (Alix von Wattenwyl), Elfenau. Die Geschichte eines bernischen Landsitzes und seiner Bewohner, Bern 1959.
- Alville, Des cours princières aux demeures helvétiques, Lausanne 1962
- Erika Bestenreiner, Die Frauen aus dem Hause Coburg. Munich: Piper 2008, ISBN 3-492-04905-2
- Helen Rappaport, The Rebel Romanov: Julie of Saxe-Coburg, the Empress Russia Never Had, St. Martin's Press 2025, ISBN 1250273129
