= Prince Leopold of Saxe-Coburg and Gotha (disambiguation) =

Prince Leopold of Saxe-Coburg and Gotha was a German prince of the house of Saxe-Coburg-Gotha.

Prince Leopold of Saxe-Coburg and Gotha may also refer to:

- Prince Leopold Clement of Saxe-Coburg and Gotha (1878–1916)
- Johann Leopold, Hereditary Prince of Saxe-Coburg and Gotha (1906-1972), Duke of Albany
- Leopold I, Prince of Saxe-Coburg and Gotha (1790-1865), King of the Belgians
