= George August, Count of Erbach-Schönberg =

George August was the Count of Erbach-Schönberg and an Imperial counselor.

== Biography ==
He was the youngest son of George Albert II, Count of Erbach-Fürstenau, and Countess Anna Dorothea of Hohenlohe-Waldenburg. He was born on 17 June 1691 in Waldenburg. Georg died on 29 March 1758 in Konig, aged 66.

== Family ==
At the age of 28, Georg married Ferdinande Henriette, Countess of Stolberg-Gedern, aged 20, on Friday 15 December 1719 in Gedern. She was born on Friday 2 October 1699 in Gedern, daughter of Ludwig Christian of Stolberg-Wernigerode and Duchess Christine of Mecklenburg-Güstrow. Ferdinande died on Saturday 31 January 1750 in Erbach, aged 50.

== Issue ==
1. Countess Christine of Erbach-Schonberg (b. Schönberg, Starkenburg, Hesse-Darmstadt, 5 May 1721 – d. Eschleiz, Reuss-Juengere-Linie, Thuringia, 26 November 1769), married in Schönberg on 2 October 1742 to Heinrich XII, Count of Reuss-Schleiz (Schleiz 15 May 1716-Kirschkau 25 June 1784).
2. Georg Ludwig II, Count of Erbach-Schonberg (b. Schönberg, 27 January 1723 – d. Plön, Holstein, 11 February 1777), married in Plön on 11 November 1764 to Duchess Friederike of Schleswig-Holstein-Sonderburg-Plön (1736–1769).
3. Count Franz Karl of Erbach (b. Schönberg, 28 July 1724 – d. Schönberg, 29 September 1788), married in Bergheim, Oberhesse, Hesse-Darmstadt on 4 September 1778 to Countess Auguste Karoline of Ysenburg und Büdingen zu Büdingen.
4. Christian Adolf, Count of Erbach (b. Gedern, 23 August 1725 – d. Gedern, 29 March 1726).
5. Countess Karoline Ernestine of Erbach-Schönberg (b. Gedern, 20 August 1727 – d. Ebersdorf, 22 April 1796), married Heinrich XXIV, Count Reuss-Ebersdorf, on 28 June 1754 in Thurnau, Bavaria.
6. Count Christian of Erbach (b. Gedern, 7 October 1728 – d. Mergentheim, 29 May 1799).
7. Countess Auguste Friederike of Erbach (b. Schönberg, 20 March 1730 – d. Thurnau, 5 September 1801), married in Schönberg on 13 September 1753 to Christian Count of Giech-Wolfstein.
8. Count Georg August of Erbach (b. Schönberg, 9 March 1731 – d. König, 8 February 1799).
9. Count Karl of Erbach-Schonberg (b. Schönberg, 10 February 1732 – d. Schönberg, 29 July 1816) married in Cernetice, Strakonice, Bohemia then Habsburg monarchy, now Czech Republic, on 1 July 1783 to Maria Johanna Nepomucena Zadubsky von Schönthal.
10. Count Friedrich of Erbach (b. Schönberg, 22 January 1733 – d. Schönberg, 6 April 1733).
11. Countess Louise Leonore of Erbach (b. Schönberg, 26 August 1735 – d. Schönberg, 23 January 1816), married on 6 July 1750 to Leopold Casimir, Count of Rechteren.
12. Count Kasimir of Erbach (b. Schönberg, 27 September 1736 – d. Prague, Bohemia then Habsburg monarchy, now Czech Republic, 6 April 1760).
13. Count Gustav Ernst of Erbach-Schönberg (b. Schönberg, 27 April 1739 – d. Zwingenberg, 17 February 1812), married in Rottleberode on 3 August 1753 to Countess Henriette of Stolberg-Stolberg.
