= Affair of the Spanish Marriages =

Series of scandals involving France, Spain, and the United Kingdom

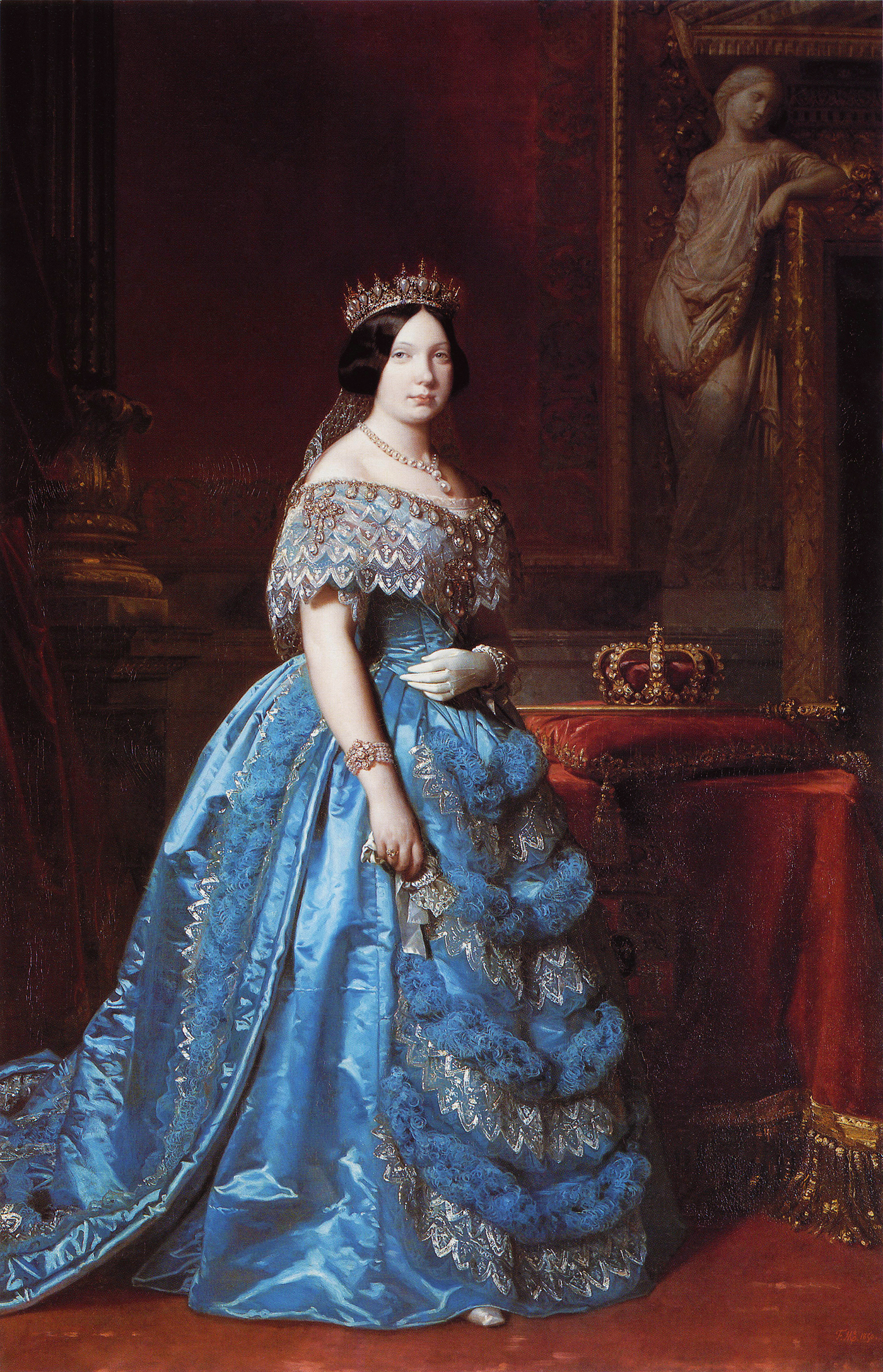
Isabella II, queen of Spain. In the end, she married the French candidate.

The Affair of the Spanish Marriages was a series of intrigues between France, Spain, and the United Kingdom relating to the marriages of Queen Isabella II of Spain and her sister the infanta Luisa Fernanda in 1846. Britain and France took opposing roles with British Foreign Secretary Lord Palmerston as hostile to France. However, France was successful in promoting a French-backed husband for the queen of Spain. The affair led to a deterioration of relations between France and Britain in the final years of the July Monarchy.

== Background ==
François Guizot, the French foreign minister, had been a supporter of friendly relations with Britain and had served as France's ambassador in London in 1840. During Guizot's tenure in London, the two countries had been brought to the brink of war on the matter of the Syrian question, before France's king Louis-Philippe intervened to de-escalate the crisis. The second Soult government was formed in autumn of 1840 in France with Guizot as foreign minister, and Guizot set himself to the task of restoring friendly relationships with other European powers – including Britain – who had sided with the Ottoman Empire in the crisis. Guizot became a personal friend of the British foreign minister, Lord Aberdeen. Relations between Britain and France warmed significantly during the tenure of the Conservative Peel government.

Peel and Aberdeen resigned from their posts in 1846 over disputes relating to the Corn Laws, where they were succeeded by a Liberal government led by Lord John Russell, with Lord Palmerston serving as foreign minister. Guizot's relationships with this new government were strained at best – Palmerston had been Britain's foreign minister during the Syrian crisis, and had directed an aggressive strategy to bolster the Ottoman Empire in direct contradiction to France's designs. Palmerston's reappointment as foreign minister in 1846 was seen in France as a threat.

== Crisis ==
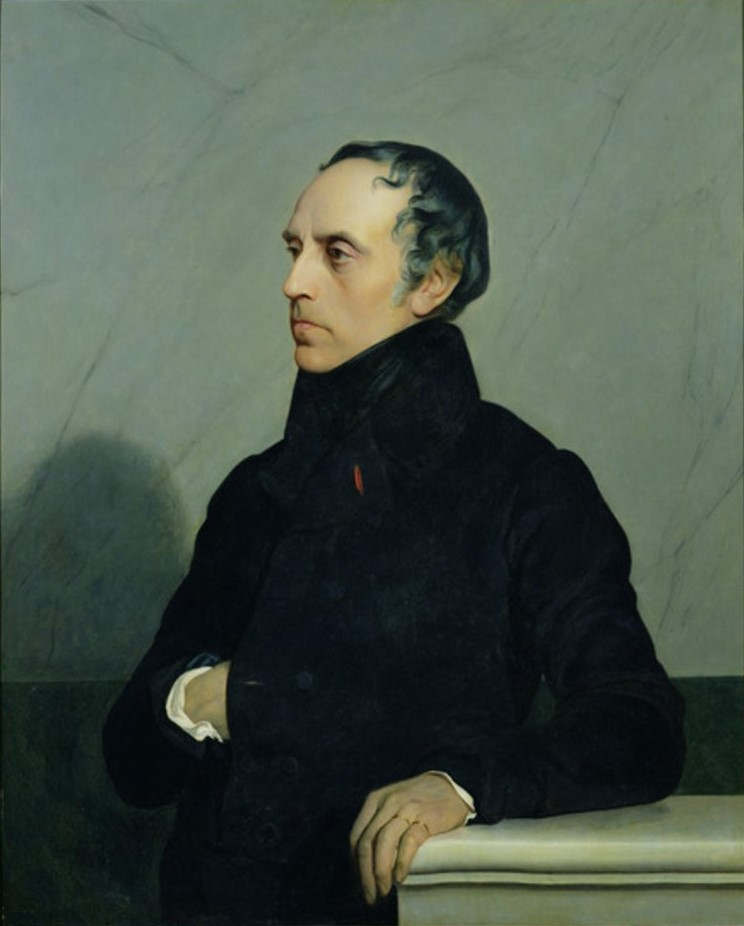
François Guizot, French foreign minister

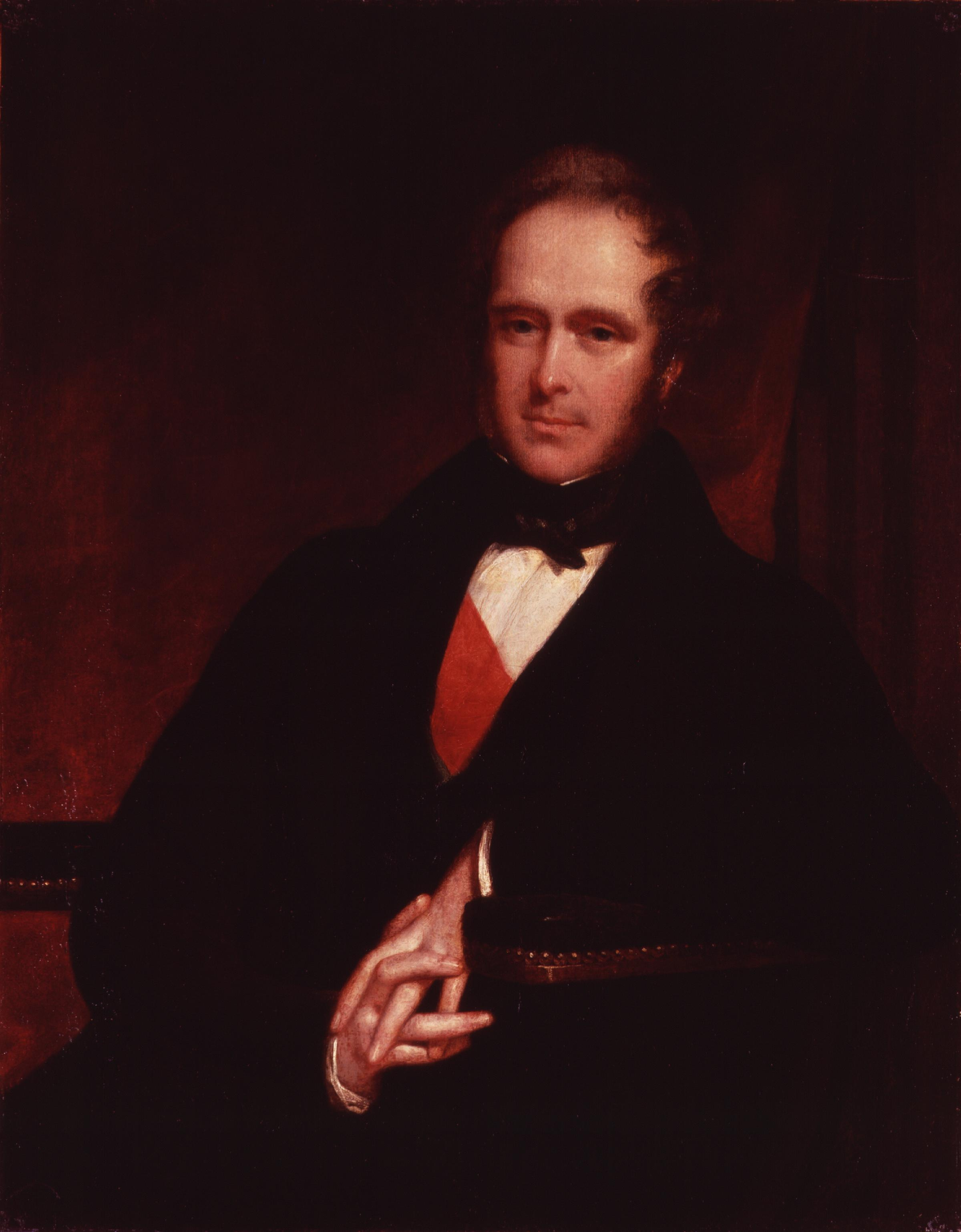
Henry John Temple, 3rd Viscount Palmerston, British foreign minister

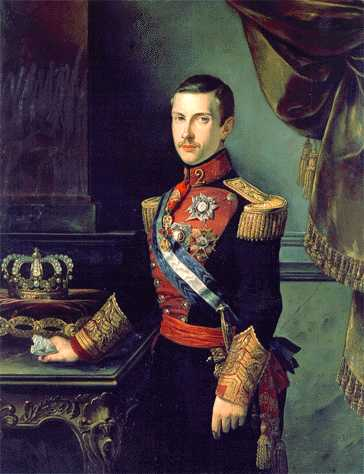
Francis, Duke of Cádiz, the French candidate

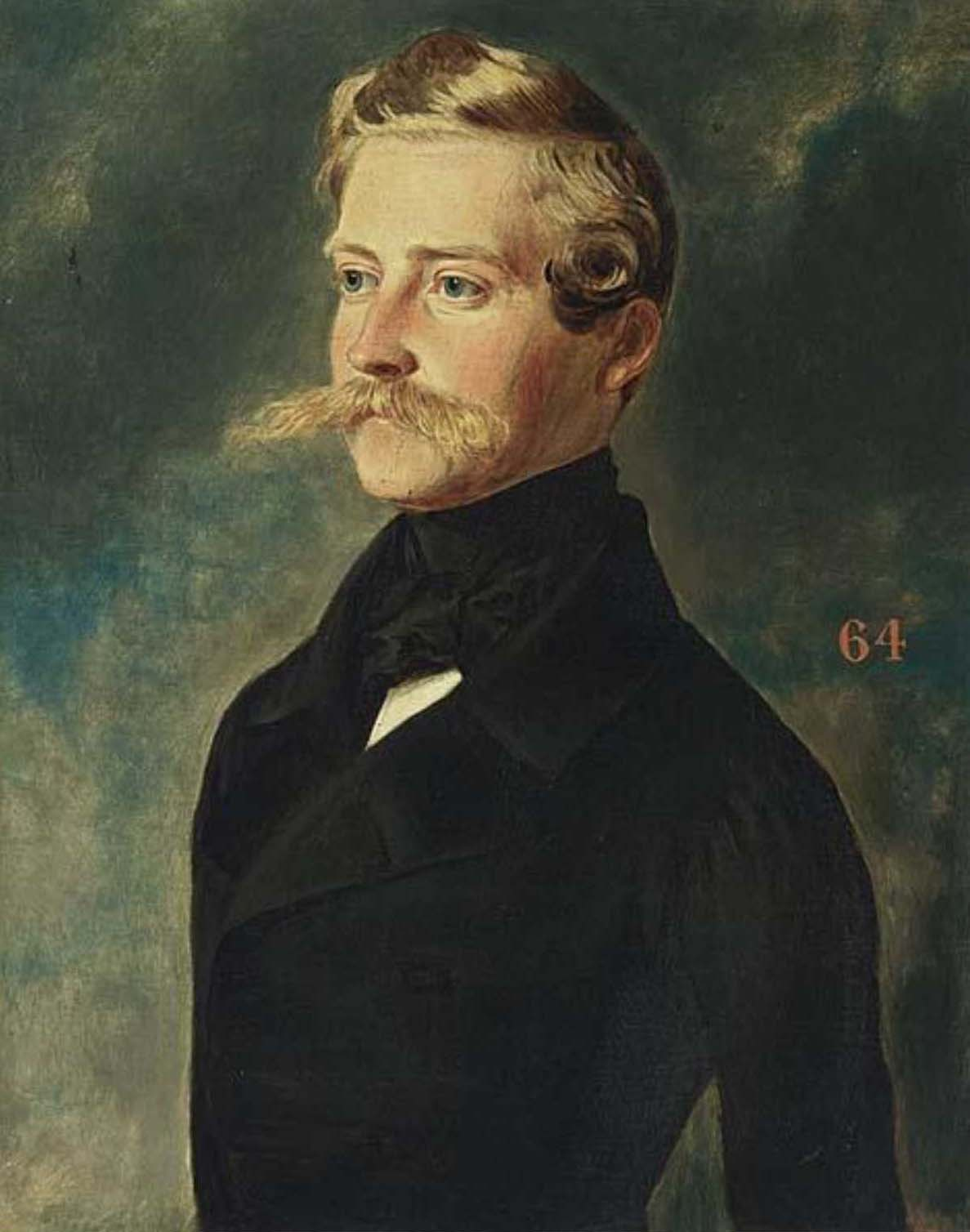
Prince Leopold of Saxe-Coburg and Gotha, the British candidate

British fears of a union between the French and Spanish Crowns were long-held; they had been central to the War of the Spanish Succession a century and a half earlier. Guizot, intent on rebuilding relations with Britain and his friend Lord Aberdeen in the early 1840s, had come to an understanding with his British counterpart that Isabella, the Spanish queen, would marry a Bourbon of the Spanish or Neapolitan branches, rather than a Bourbon of France.

Palmerston rejected this understanding which had been made with his predecessor, and instead revived the suggestion of Prince Leopold of Saxe-Coburg and Gotha as a suitor. The House of Saxe-Coburg and Gotha was closely linked to the British royal house; Queen Victoria's mother was born Princess Victoria of Saxe-Coburg and Gotha and her husband since 1840 was Prince Albert of Saxe-Coburg and Gotha. The British had backed the candidature of another Prince Leopold of Saxe-Coburg and Gotha as king of Belgium in 1830, and although he had married Louis-Philippe's eldest daughter, the French were confronted with the possibility of facing a Britain-aligned dynasty on both of France's northern and southern borders if Palmerston succeeded in his enterprise. Guizot therefore determined to adamantly oppose any Coburg marriages.

The affair connected also with the chaotic politics of mid-19th-century Spain. The French backed the ruling conservative moderados, while the British backed the opposition liberal progresistas, who desired to reinstate the liberal Spanish Constitution of 1812. In order to protect their political position, the moderados moved to carry out the French-backed marriages, over Palmerston's protestations, who insisted that the marriages were a breach of the 1713 Peace of Utrecht. Palmerston's efforts failed – on 10 October 1846, Isabella's 16th birthday, the Spanish queen was married to her cousin, Francis, Duke of Cádiz, while her sister Luisa Fernanda was married to Antoine, Duke of Montpensier, the youngest son of Louis-Philippe of France.

== Aftermath ==
Although the French won the day and prevented a British-backed suitor from becoming Spain's king consort, they and their moderado allies in Spain had to pressure the young queen into the marriage, as the Duke of Cádiz was thought to be impotent. The affair was a source of embarrassment for France. The rapprochement between Britain and France was wrecked, and Guizot sought allies instead among the reactionary Northern courts led by Klemens von Metternich. This movement toward conservatism drove liberals from the ruling coalition in France, and contributed to the final end of the Orleanist monarchy in France two years later in the Revolution of 1848.

Both of the marriages proved to be unhappy ones.

== See also ==
- History of Spain (1808–1874)
