= Prince Leopold of Saxe-Coburg and Gotha =

German prince

Prince Leopold
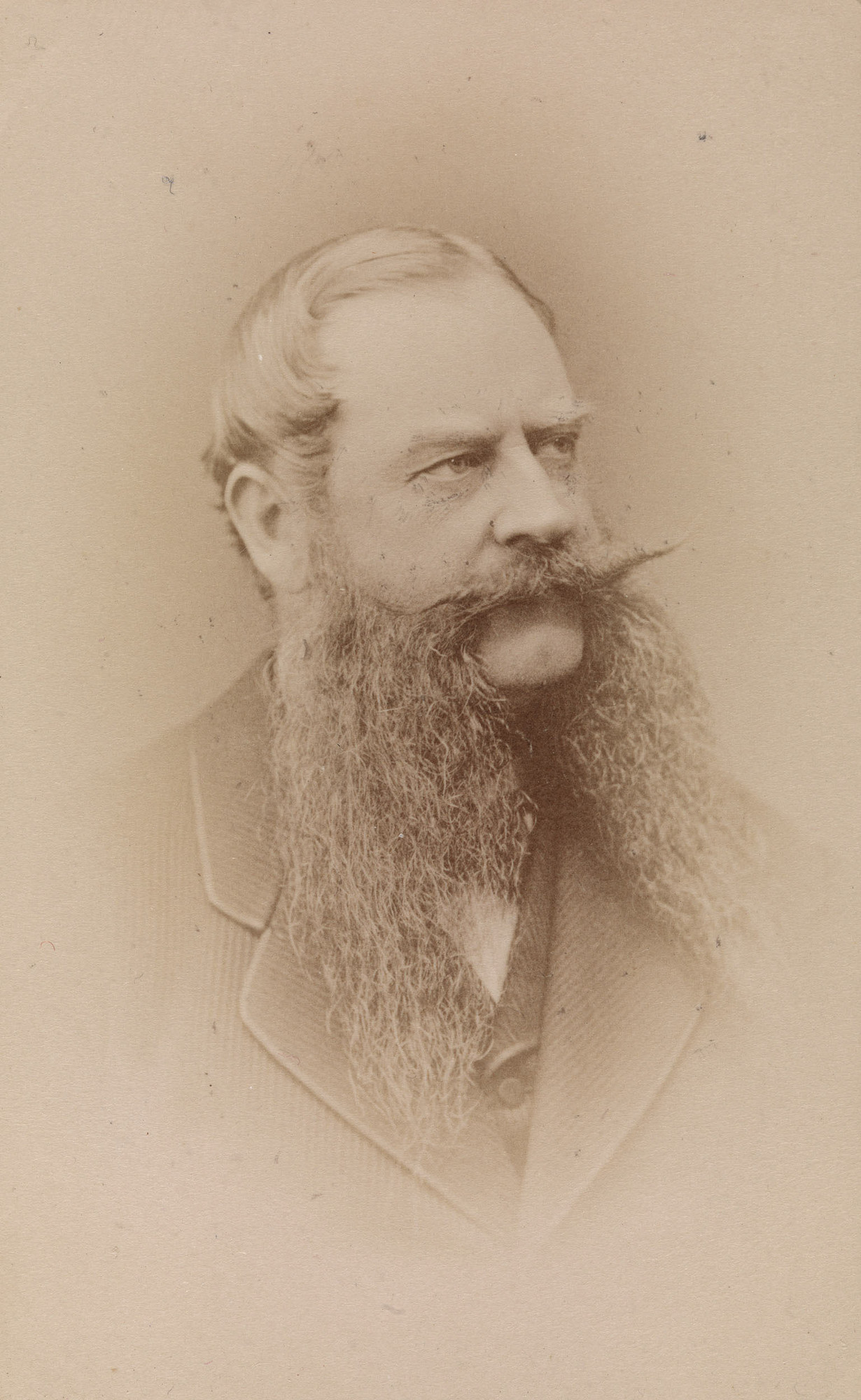
- Photograph, c. 1870
- Born: 31 January 1824; Vienna
- Died: 20 May 1884 (aged 60); Vienna
- Burial: Friedhof am Glockenberg, Coburg
- Spouse: Constanze Geiger (m. 1861)
- Issue: Franz, Baron of Ruttenstein
Names
- Leopold Franz Julius
- House: Saxe-Coburg and Gotha-Koháry
- Father: Prince Ferdinand of Saxe-Coburg and Gotha
- Mother: Princess Mária Antónia Koháry de Csábrág et Szitnya

Prince Leopold Franz Julius of Saxe-Coburg and Gotha (31 January 1824 – 20 May 1884) was a German prince of the House of Saxe-Coburg and Gotha-Koháry.

== Early life ==
Born Prince Leopold Franz Julius of Saxe-Coburg-Saalfeld, Duke in Saxony on 31 January 1824, he was the third son of Ferdinand, Prince of Saxe-Coburg and Gotha-Koháry and Princess Mária Antónia Koháry de Csábrág et Szitnya.

Leopold was a younger son and was unlikely to inherit titles or land, so he entered the Army in the service of the Austrian Empire. At one point, Leopold was considered as a potential husband for Isabel II of Spain. This did not, however, prove to be realistic, given the resistance of France and other European powers. Spain had been the scene of Great Power rivalry throughout the period since 1815 and all the Great Powers were seeking to exert their influence by supporting different candidates. The Saxe-Coburg family was perceived to be too closely linked with British interests. The Coburg influence extended widely. In Great Britain, Queen Victoria and her husband Prince Albert were Leopold's first cousins, while Leopold I of Belgium was Leopold's paternal and Victoria's maternal uncle, and Leopold's brother was King Ferdinand II of Portugal, husband of Queen Maria II of Portugal. Leopold's candidature in the Affair of the Spanish Marriages was used by France as the excuse to negotiate the hasty marriage between Queen Isabella II of Spain and her cousin Francis of Spain at the same time as that between the son of Louis Philippe and the Queen of Spain's younger sister.

== Marriage and later life ==
Later, Leopold met Constanze Geiger, a common woman. They had a son, Franz, in Vienna on 12 October 1860. Leopold and Constanze married six months later on 23 April 1861. Immediately, he recognized his son, who was created Freiherr von Ruttenstein on 24 July 1862. That same day, Constanze was created Freifrau von Ruttenstein in her own right. Because the marriage of his parents was unequal (and thus morganatic), Franz was barred from the succession of Koháry and Saxe-Coburg and Gotha. Regardless, he died childless and unmarried on 29 August 1899.

== Burial ==
Leopold is buried in the ducal mausoleum at Friedhof am Glockenberg, Coburg.

== Honours ==
- Belgium: Grand Cordon of the Order of Leopold (military), 3 May 1850
- (Saxe-Coburg and Gotha) (Duchy of Saxe-Altenburg) (Saxe-Meiningen) Ernestine duchies: Grand Cross of the Saxe-Ernestine House Order, March 1842
- Kingdom of Portugal: Grand Cross of the Order of the Tower and Sword, 19 June 1843
