= Constanze Geiger =

Austrian musician and actress

- Freifrau von Ruttenstein
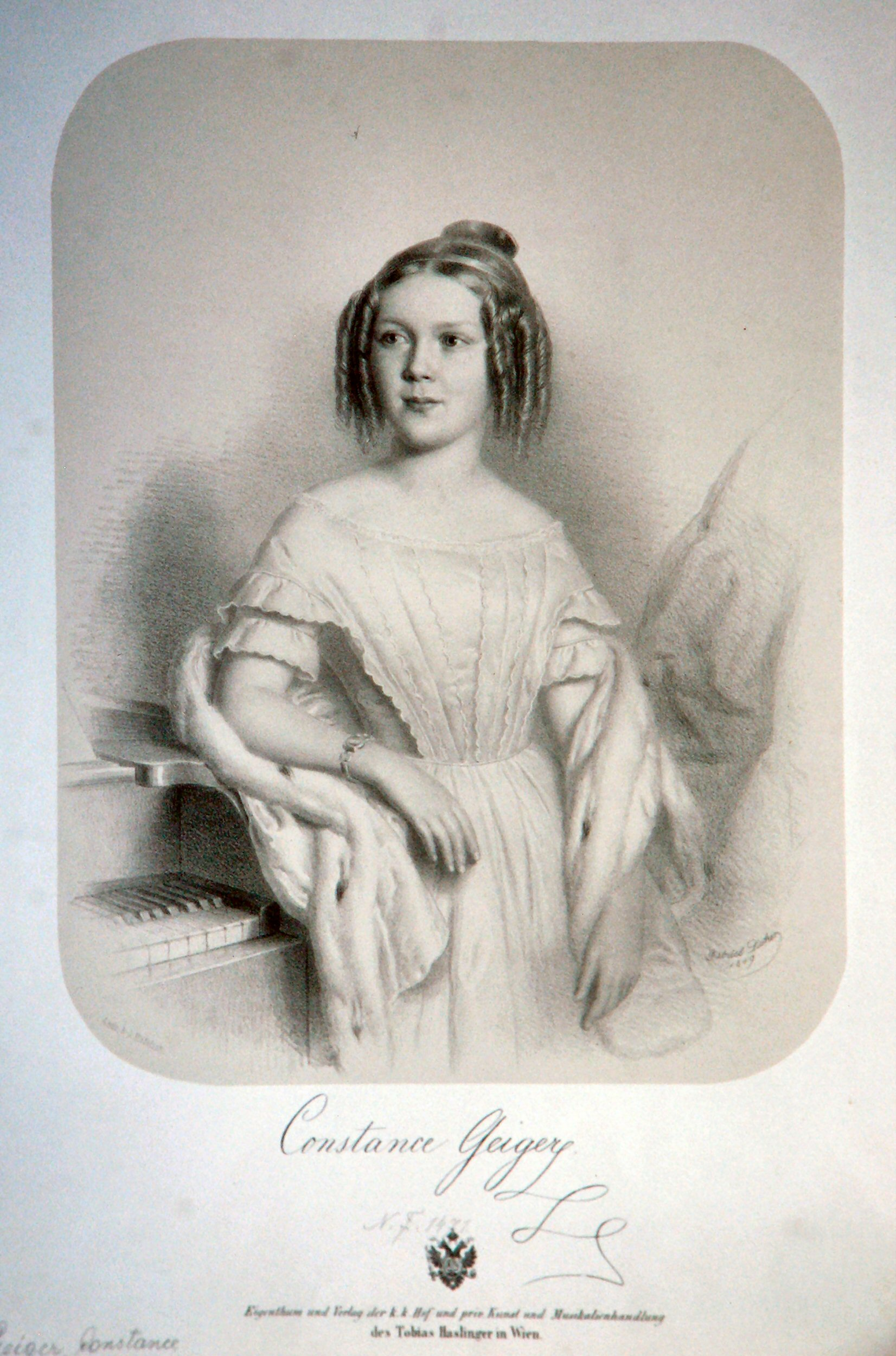
- Portrait of Constanze Geiger as a girl in 1849 by Gabriel Decker.
- Born: 16 October 1835; Vienna
- Died: 24 August 1890 (aged 54); Dieppe
- Burial: Montmartre Cemetery, Paris
- Spouse: Prince Leopold of Saxe-Coburg and Gotha (m. 1861; died 1884)
- Issue: Franz, Baron of Ruttenstein
Names
- Constanze Therese Adelaide
- House: Saxe-Coburg and Gotha-Koháry (by marriage)
- Father: Joseph Geiger
- Mother: Theresia Ržiha

Constanze Therese Adelaide Geiger, Freifrau von Ruttenstein (16 October 1835 – 24 August 1890) was an Austrian pianist, theatrical actress, composer and singer.

== Biography ==
Geiger was the daughter of the composer Joseph Geiger and the court hat-maker/modist Theresia Geiger (née Ržiha, 1804–1865). Her parents nurtured her musical talents, and her father was her first piano teacher. She continued piano lessons with Johann Wenzel Tomaschek as well as Simon Sechter. Sechter gave her lessons in composition and counterpoint as well.

Geiger made her public debut as a concert pianist at age six. She played her own compositions in public first at age eight. In April 1845, the first public performance by other musicians besides herself of one of her compositions, Preghiera für Militärmusik, took place at the Pfarrkirche Rennweg am Katschberg. She made her theatrical stage debut in 1852 at the Friedrich-Wilhelm-Städtische Theater, where in addition to acting, she was the pianist for her own compositions.

Geiger began a relationship with Prince Leopold of Saxe-Coburg and Gotha, after the two met at the Zum Goldenen Lamm inn. On 12 October 1860, she gave birth to her only child, Franz Assis Leopold Joseph (12 October 1860 - 29 August 1899). On 23 April 1862, she and Prince Leopold married, which resulted in her elevation to the Freiherrenstand as a result of this morganatic marriage, although their son Franz was barred from the Saxe-Coburg line of succession in parallel. Following her marriage, Geiger withdrew from the stage entirely settled and lived with her family at Castle Radmeric. Her compositions for chamber music and church music, however, were still performed. After the death of her husband in 1884, she moved to Paris. Geiger died on 24 August 1890 in Dieppe, Normandy. She was buried in Montmartre Cemetery, Paris.

Raimund Lissy has written a biography of Geiger, „Es liegt ein eigener Zauber in diesem Wunderkinde!“ Constanze Geiger – Komponistin, Pianistin, Schauspielerin aus Wien, published in 2024. Lissy is an Austrian violinist and a member of the Vienna Philharmonic Orchestra. In December 2024, the Vienna Philharmonic programmed Geiger's Fernandus-Walzer for its annual Voraufführung, Silvesterkonzert and Neujahrskonzert performances, as part of their Vienna New Year's Concert performance series, culminating in the 1 January 2025 concert. Geiger is the first female composer ever to be featured in the Vienna Philharmonic's Neujahrskonzert.

== Selected compositions ==
- 4 Valses, op. 3 (1845)
- Preghiera
- Ave Maria (1846)
- Duettino (for tenor and bass)
- Frühlings-Träume Walzer, op. 8 (1847)
- Abschieds-Walzer, op. 9 (1848)
- Ferdinandus-Walzer (1848)
- Das Fuchslied als Trauermarsch (1849)
- Radetzky Marsch, op. 14, no. 1
- Sehnsucht (Romanze), op. 15 (1850)
- Carlsklänge (Walzer)
- Franz Joseph-Marsch, op. 19 (1852)
- Ein Volkswalzer, op. 22a
- Nandl-Polka, op. 22b (1852)
- Elisabethen-Vermählungsmarsch (1854)
- Lanckoronsky-Marsch, op. 24
- Chinesen-Polka, op. 26
- Unbefriedigte Sehnsucht (Nocturne), op. 27 (1856)
- Herzklopfer-Walzer, op. 29 (1856)
- 'Kennst du meine Leiden?' (Nocturne), op. 30 (1856)
- 3 Nocturnes (1859)
- Kaiser-Einzugs-Marsch (1862)
- Offertorium (1873)

== Sources ==
- Eisenberg, Ludwig (1903). "Geiger, Constanze". Großes biographisches Lexikon der Deutschen Bühne im XIX. Jahrhundert (in German). Leipzig: Paul List. p. 310.
- Constanze Geiger bei certosaverlag.de
