= George Albert II, Count of Erbach-Fürstenau =

German noble (1648–1717)

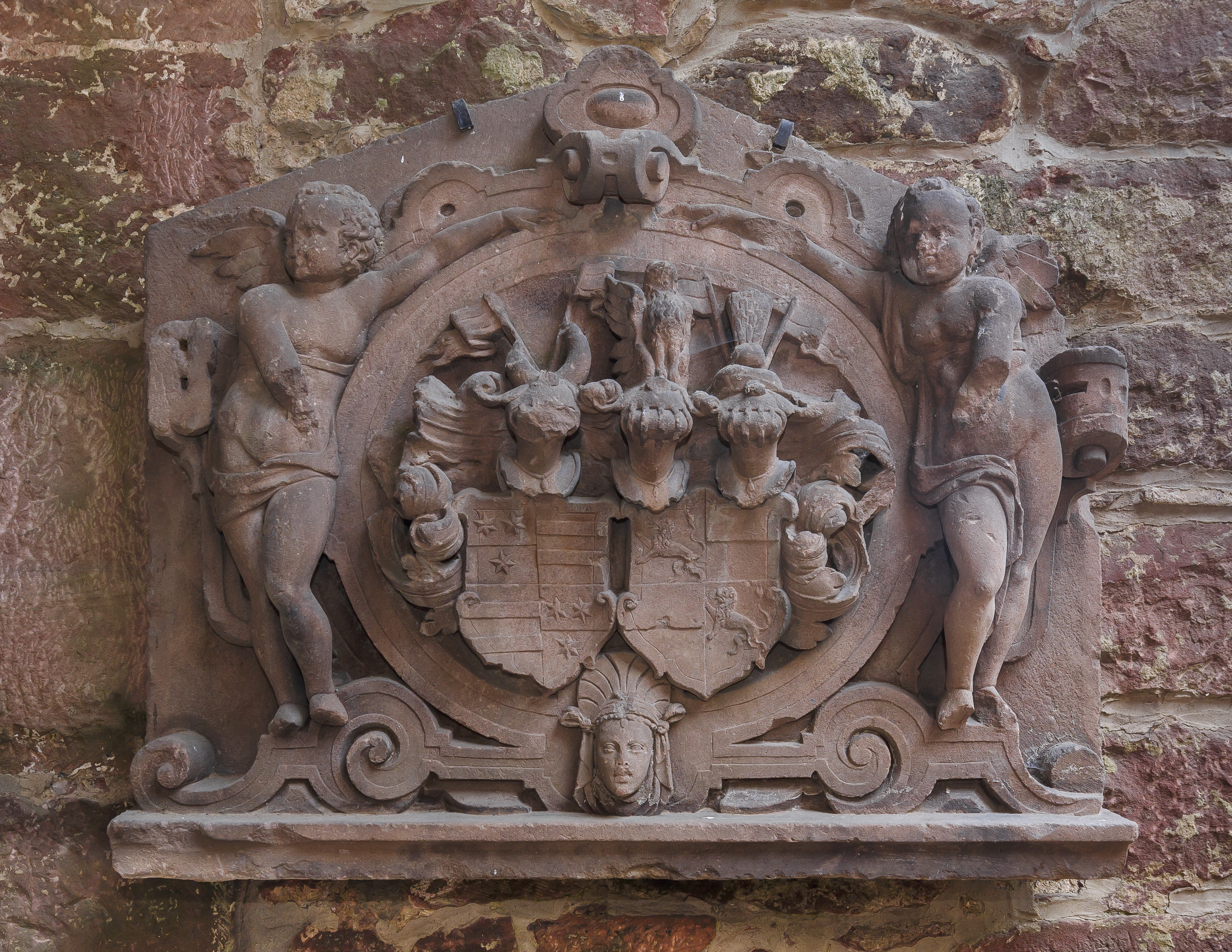
Arms of the Counts of Erbach-Fürstenau

George Albert II, Count of Erbach-Fürstenau (26 February 1648 – 23 March 1717), was a member of the German House of Erbach who held the fiefs of Fürstenau, Schönberg, Seeheim, Reichenberg and Breuberg.

== Early life and ancestry ==
Born in Fürstenau, he was the ninth child and sixth (but fourth surviving) son of George Albert I, Count of Erbach-Schönberg and his third wife, Countess Elisabeth Dorothea of Hohenlohe-Waldenburg-Schillingsfürst, the eldest child and daughter of George Frederick II, Count of Hohenlohe-Waldenburg-Schillingsfürst (1595-1635). George Albert II was born posthumously, three months after his father's death, on 25 November 1647.

== Reign ==
He pursued a military career and became an Oberstleutnant of the Imperial army.

Following the division of the Erbach patrimony in 1672, George Albert II received the districts of Schönberg, Seeheim and 1/4 of Breuberg; in 1678, following the death of his brother George IV, he added to his domains the districts of Fürstenau and Reichenberg.

He was married to his cousin, Countess Anna Dorothea of Hohenlohe-Waldenburg (1656-1724) and had issue.

== Death ==
George Albert II, Count of Erbach-Fürstenau died on 23 March 1717, in Fürstenau, aged 69. His body was buried in the Erbach family crypt in Michelstadt, Odenwald, Hesse, Germany.
