= Thurnau =

- Municipality
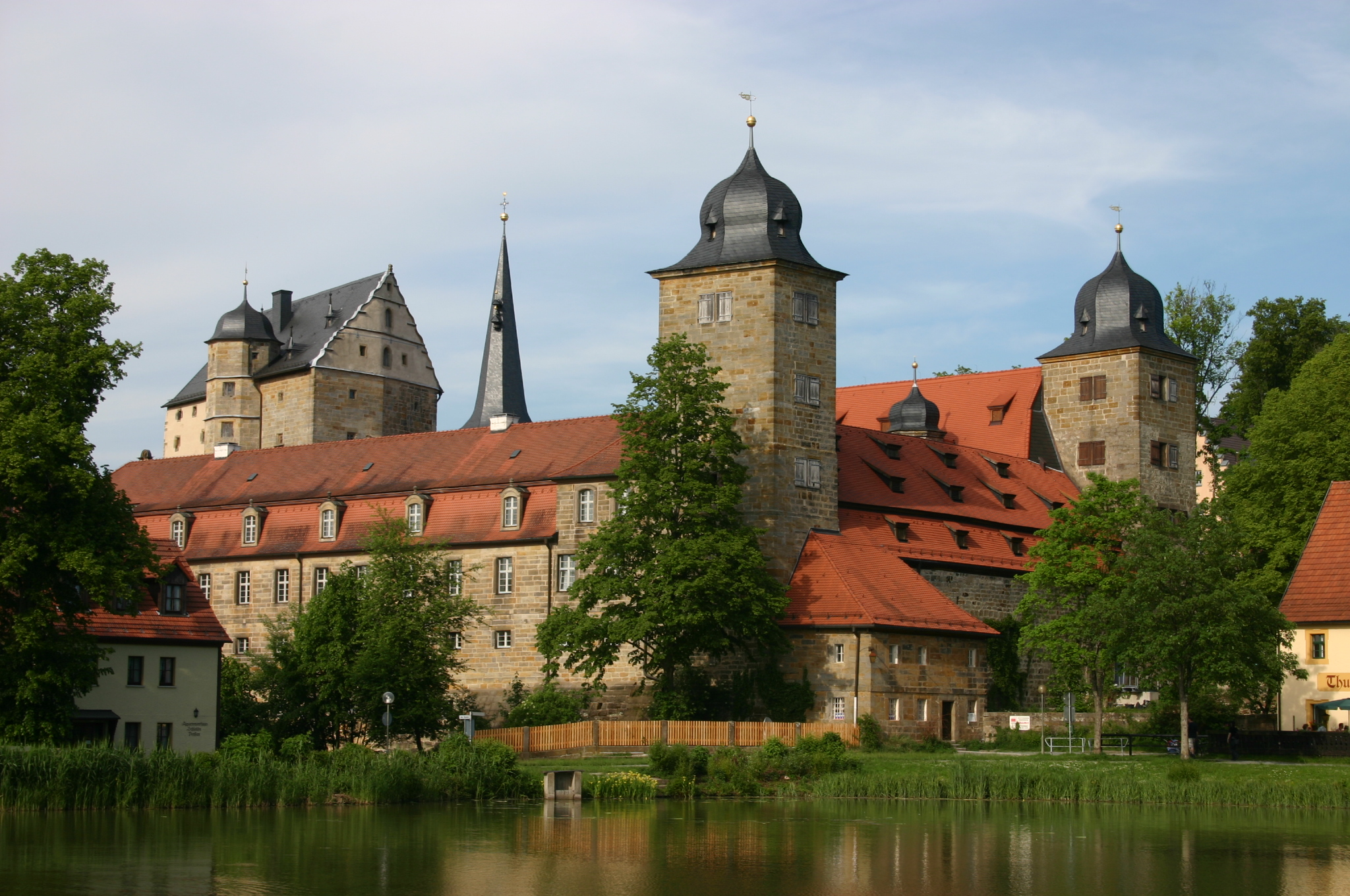
- Thurnau Castle

- Coat of arms

- Location of Thurnau within Kulmbach district
- Interactive map of Thurnau
- Location within Germany Location within Bavaria
- Coordinates: 50°1′32″N 11°23′39″E
- Country: Germany
- State: Bavaria
- Admin. region: Oberfranken
- District: Kulmbach

Government
  - Mayor (2020–26): Martin Bernreuther (CSU)

Area
  - Total: 64.20 km^{2} (24.79 sq mi)
- Elevation: 363 m (1,191 ft)

Population (2025-12-31)
  - Total: 4,055
  - Density: 63.16/km^{2} (163.6/sq mi)
- Time zone: UTC+01:00 (CET)
  - Summer (DST): UTC+02:00 (CEST)
- Postal codes: 95349
- Dialling codes: 09228
- Vehicle registration: KU
- Website: www.thurnau.de

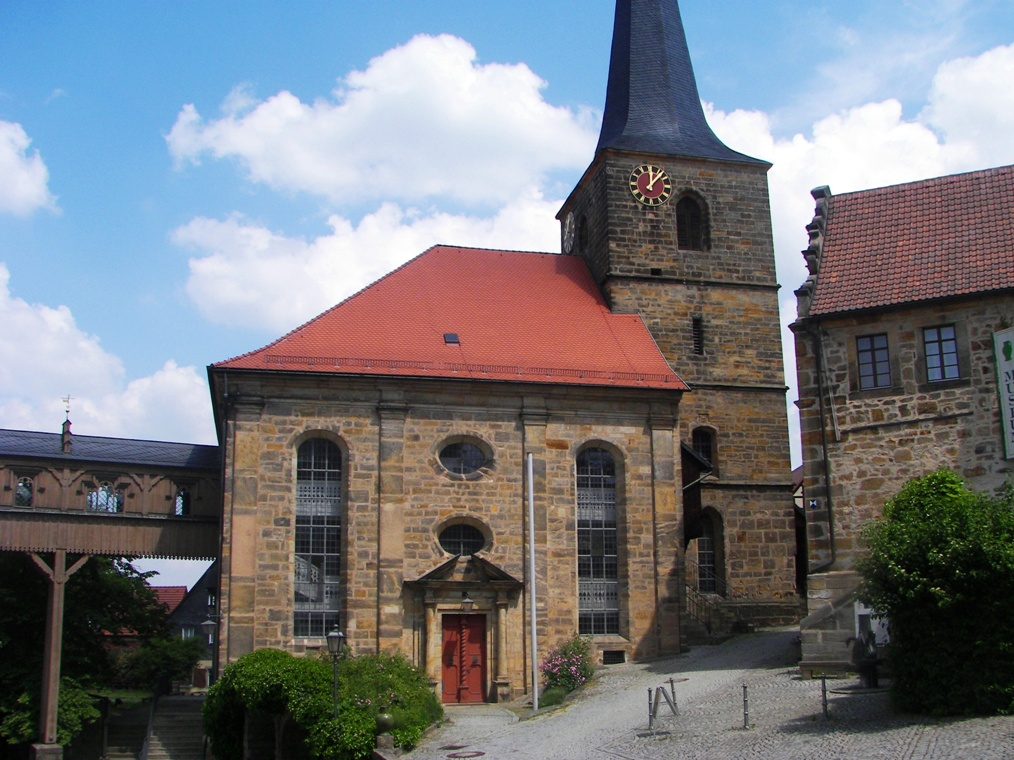
The Evangelical-Lutheran St.-Laurentius-Church of Thurnau

Thurnau is a municipality in the district of Kulmbach, Germany.

It is known for golfing as well as its potteries.

Thurnau is known for transmitter Thurnau, the medium wave transmission site for Deutschlandfunk, a German national information radio station.

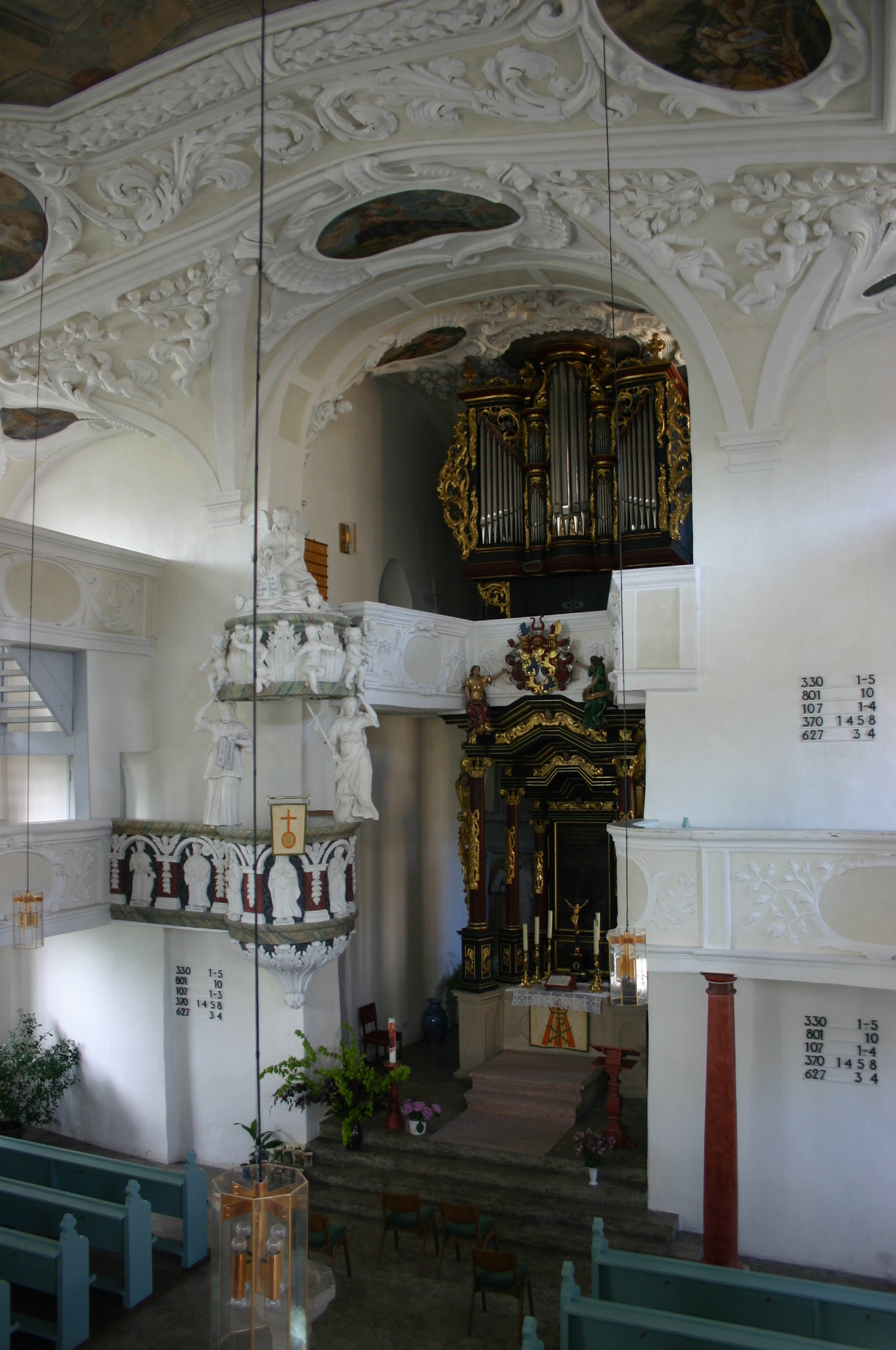
Inside the Church of Thurnau

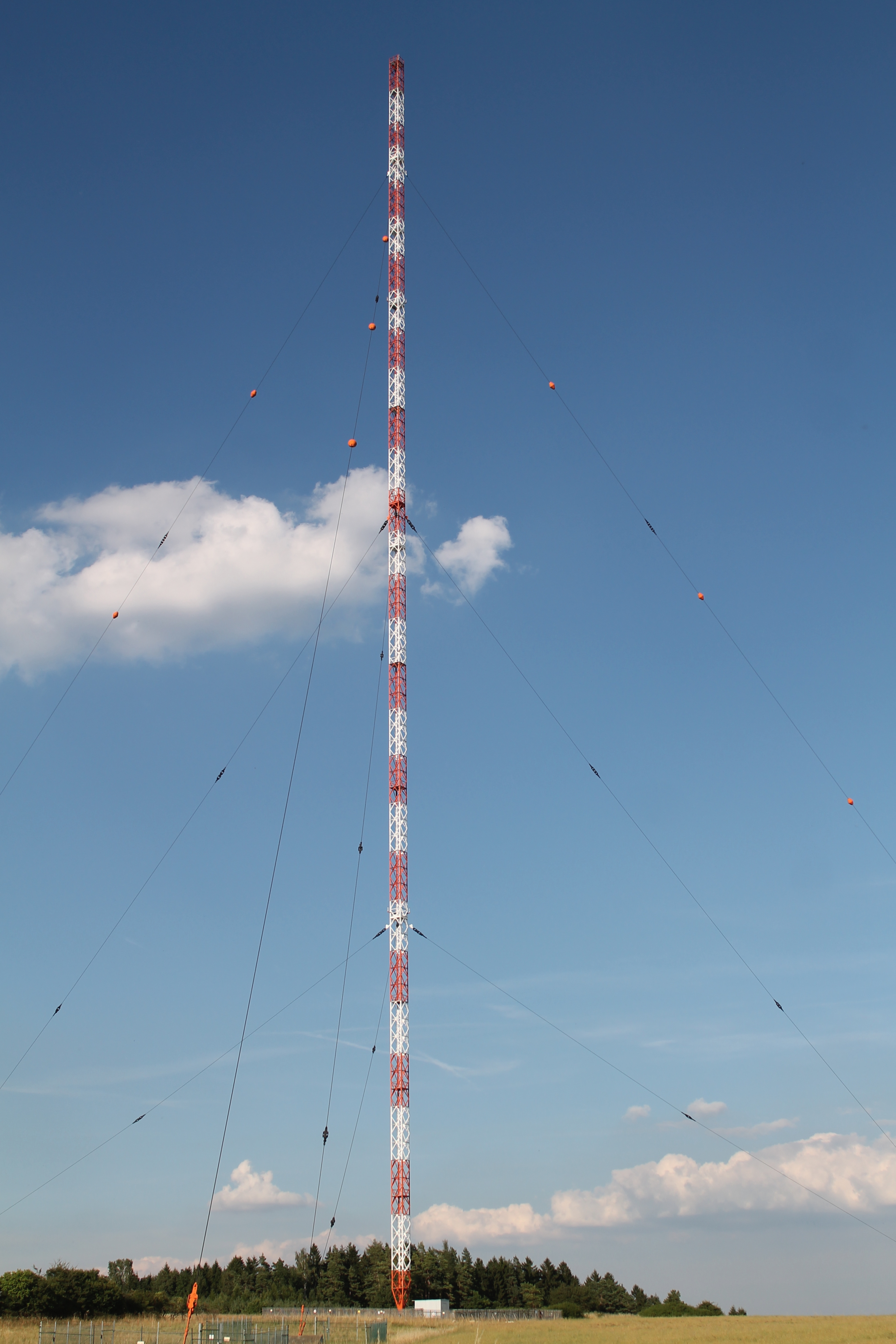
Mast of Thurnau transmitter (height: 240 metres)

== City arrangement ==
Thurnau is arranged in the following boroughs:

- Alladorf
- Berndorf
- Felkendorf
- Hörlinreuth
- Hutschdorf
- Kemeritz
- Lanzenreuth
- Leesau
- Limmersdorf
- Lochau
- Menchau
- Partenfeld
- Rottlersreuth
- Tannfeld
- Thurnau
- Trumsdorf

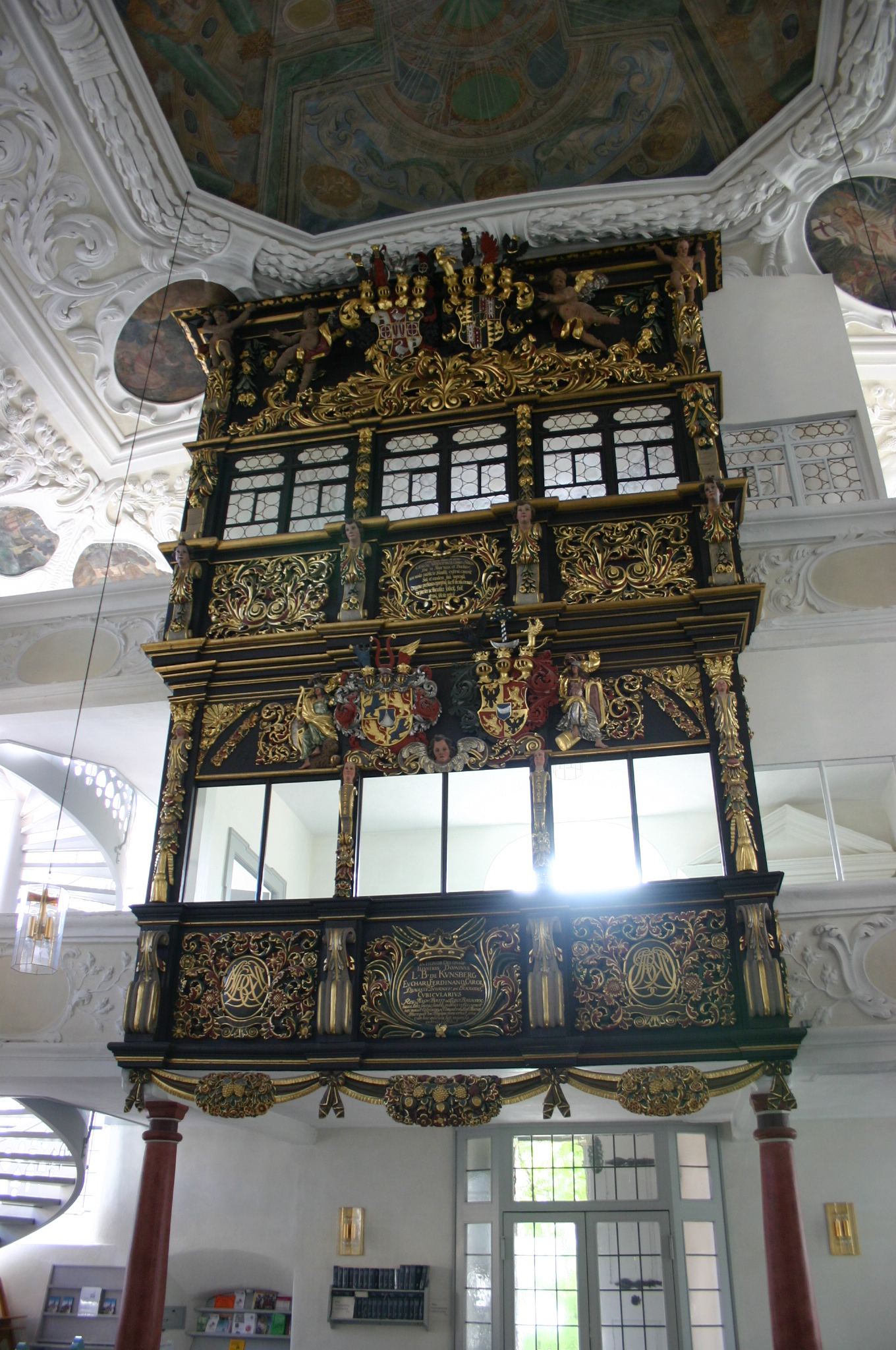
Inside the Church of Thurnau

== Famous people ==
=== Famous people born in Thurnau ===
- Carl von Linde, (11 June 1842) was a German engineer who developed refrigeration and gas separation technologies.

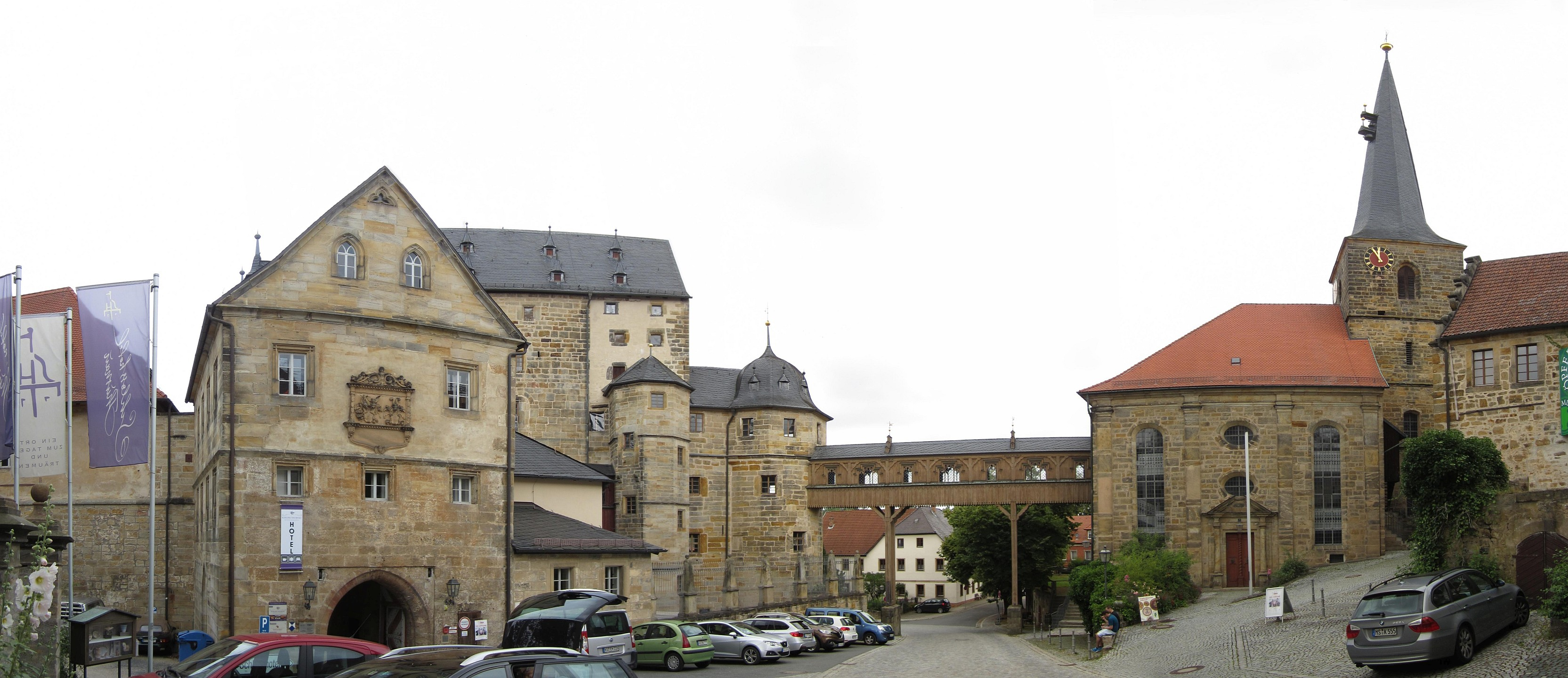
Bridge from castle to Church
