= Karl Maximilian, Prince of Dietrichstein =

German prince (1702–1784)

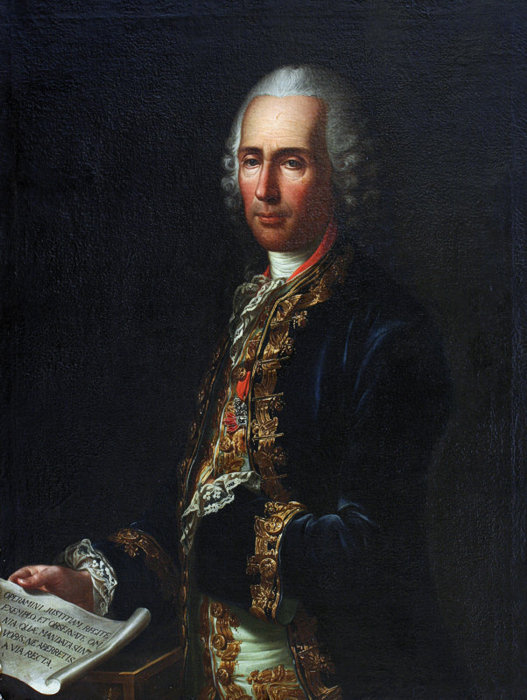
Karl Maximilian, Prince of Dietrichstein. Painting by Josef Hickel, 1773.

Karl Maximilian, Prince of Dietrichstein (Karl Maximilian Philipp Franz Xaver; 28 April 1702 – 24 October 1784), was a German prince member of the House of Dietrichstein, 6th Prince (Fürst) of Dietrichstein zu Nikolsburg, Princely Count (gefürsteter Graf) of Tarasp, Baron (Freiherr) of Hollenburg, Finkenstein and Thalberg.

Born in Brno, he was the eighth child and third (but eldest surviving) son of Walther Franz Xaver Anton, 5th Prince of Dietrichstein, by his second wife, Countess Karolina Maximiliana Pruskovsky von Proskau.

== Life ==
Being the third son of his family, Karl Maximilian was destined since birth to an ecclesiastical career; for this, he enjoyed a good education from private tutors and took the customary Grand Tour through Europe. The early deaths of his older brothers Karl Franz (1703) and Johann Joseph (1709) left Karl Maximilian as the eldest surviving son and heir of his father.

In addition to the titles of 6th Prince of Dietrichstein and Imperial Count of Tarasp, which Karl Maximilian inherited after his father's death in 1738, he was the owner of extended estates, including Nikolsburg, Hollenburg, Finkenstein, Thalberg, Kanitz, Leipnik (Lipník nad Bečvou), Weisskirch, Nußdorf ob der Traisen (with the including districts of Reichersdorf and Franzhausen), Libochovice, Budyně nad Ohří, Pátek, Nepomyšl and Vlachovo Březí.

At the same time, Karl Maximilian held a number of court positions. He was an Imperial Kämmerer, Oberst-Erblandmundschenk in the Duchy of Carinthia, and in 1783 after the death of his kinsman Count Dismas Joseph of Dietrichstein (from the Weichselstädt branch), he became in senior Colonerl of his house, Oberst-Hofmeister and Obersterbland-Jägermeister in the Duchy of Styria.

Karl Maximilian participated in the Aulic Council and later was a member of the Imperial Privy Council, providing him with significant influence on government business in the Holy Roman Empire, especially in the difficult times following the decision of Emperor Charles VI, who without surviving sons, named his daughter Maria Theresa heiress of the Habsburg domains in the Pragmatic Sanction. Later, during the first years of rule of Maria Theresa, Karl Maximilian was one of his advisors. During 1745-1754 he served as Oberst-Hofmarschall of Emperor Francis I, Maria Theresa's husband.

In 1749 he was appointed as the 720 Knight of the Order of the Golden Fleece together, among others with Alexander Ferdinand, 3rd Prince of Thurn and Taxis, Johann Wihelm, 2nd Prince of Trautson, Wenzel Anton, Prince of Kaunitz-Rietberg and Ferdinand Bonaventura II, Count of Harrach.

In 1754 Karl Maximilian resigned his position as Oberst-Hofmarschall, in order to devote himself to the administration of his vast estates. On the basis of the testament of his maternal grandfather, Count George Christoph Pruskovsky of Proskau, after the death of his cousin without issue on 29 July 1769, Karl Maximilian inherited the title, coats of arms and possessions of the Counts of Proskau, including the districts of Proskau (pl: Prószków; a city in Upper Silesia located in the Opole County, Opole Voivodeship in southwestern Poland) and Klein Strehlitz (pl: Strzeleczki) and a vast monetary Fideikommiss; however, shortly after he granted the title of Count of Proskau (with his respective coats of arms and lands) to his eldest son. In later 1781, due to illness and fatigue, Karl Maximilian resigned the government of the rest of his domains to his son, although he retained the title of Prince until his death.

During his 46 years of reign, Karl Maximilian expanded his domains substantially, acquiring, among others, the Lordships of Židlochovice, Velké Němčice and Cvrčovice.

On 14 September 1784 a fire broke out in Nikolsburg, destroying more than 250 homes, the entire northeastern part of the city, the Capuchin monastery and Loretan church. In the fire much of the treasure accumulated over centuries in the Loretan church was lost. The reports of the extent of damage overwhelmed the old prince, who died one month later aged 82. He was buried in the family crypt.

== Marriage and issue ==
In Nikolsburg on 2 September 1725 Karl Maximilian married with Maria Anna Josepha (25 March 1705 – 4 October 1764), a daughter of Sigismund Frederick I, Count of Khevenhüller-Aichelberg in Hohenosterwitz. They had eleven children, of whom only three survive adulthood:

- Karl Johann Baptist Walther Sigismund Ernest Nepomuk Alois (27 June 1728 – 25 May 1808), 7th Prince of Dietrichstein.
- Frederick Anton (1729 – 1730/49?).
- Franz Xaver Joseph (20 April 1730 – shortly after birth).
- Franz Thomas (1731 – shortly after birth).
- Franz de Paula Thomas Augustin Josef Johannes Nepomuk Karl (13 December 1731 – 29 November 1813), married on 25 April 1770 to Baroness Maria Karoline of Reischach. Had issue.
- Maria Theresia (28 November 1733 – 1 July 1740).
- Maria Josepha Anna Barbara (2 November 1736 – 21 December 1799), married on 20 May 1754 to Ernest Quido, Count of Harrach-Rohrau-Thannhausen.
- Franz Xaverius (16 March 1739 – 15 August 1744).
- Johann Wenzel (16 January 1741 – 17 January 1744).
- Siegmund Mathias (24 February 1742 – 15 March 1744).
- Anton de Padua (10 July/1 August 1744 – 3 January 1759).
