= Karl Johann Baptist, Prince of Dietrichstein =

German prince (1728–1808)

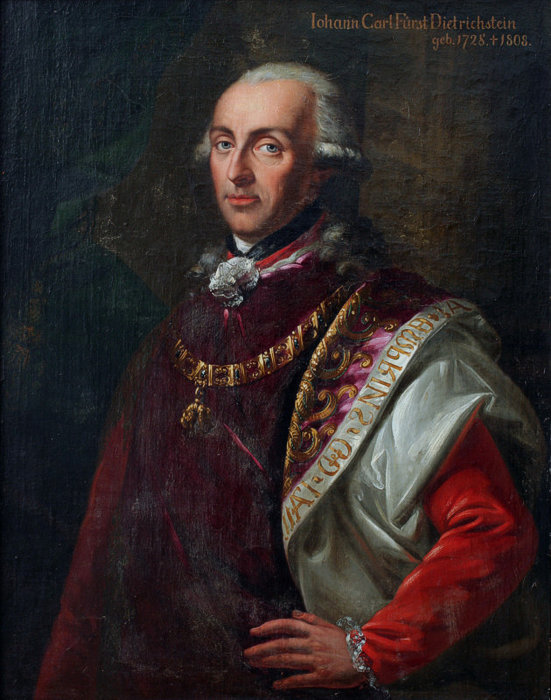
Karl Johann Baptist, Prince of Dietrichstein.

Karl Johann Baptist, Prince of Dietrichstein (Karl Johann Baptist Walther Sigismund Ernest Nepomuk Alois; 27 June 1728 – 25 May 1808), was a German prince, member of the House of Dietrichstein, 7th Prince (Fürst) of Dietrichstein zu Nikolsburg, Princely Count (gefürsteter Graf) of Tarasp, Baron (Freiherr) of Hollenburg, Finkenstein and Thalberg.

== Early life ==
Born in Nikolsburg, although some sources placed Vienna as his birthplace, he was the eldest child of Karl Maximilian, 6th Prince of Dietrichstein, and Countess Maria Anna of Khevenhüller-Aichelberg-Hohenosterwitz (1705–1764), daughter of Sigismund Frederick I, Count of Khevenhüller-Aichelberg-Hohenosterwitz (1666–1742) and Countess Ernestine of Orsini und Rosenberg (1683–1728).

== Life ==
Karl Johann, together with his younger brother Franz de Paula, graduated from the grammar school in Vienna, and in 1749 they went to study Law at Leipzig University. Shortly after, Karl Johann and his brother made the customary Grand Tour through Europe. They traveled to Hannover, the Netherlands, Belgium and then to Italy, where both princes completed their tour with a stay in Rome. They returned to the Imperial court at the end of 1752.

The brother obtained the title of Kämmerer, but Karl Johann, the eldest and Hereditary Prince (Erbprinz) became one of the secret Konferenzminister. In 1756 he obtained a diplomatic post in Denmark, where he was able to negotiate a truce against the Prussians. During this trip, he became closely connected with Freemasonry. In 1763 he traveled from Copenhagen to Berlin, where he discussed with King Frederick II the investiture of Archduke Joseph as Holy Roman Emperor. After returning to the Imperial court, he was highly rewarded.

Shortly after his return, Karl Johann married. According to the diary of his maternal uncle Johann Joseph, Prince of Khevenhüller-Metsch, the Hereditary Prince apparently wasn't inclined to marry, and even was ready to renounce his rights to his brother Franz de Paula. However, thanks to the intervention of his friend Franz Moritz von Lacy, Karl Johann met Countess Maria Christiana of Thun und Hohenstein (1738-1788), and soon became in love with her. The wedding took place in January 1764 in the Imperial court with the presence, among others, of Emperor Francis I and Empress Maria Theresa. The young couple lived after the marriage at the Imperial court in Vienna.

Karl Johann -together with Count (later Prince) Franz Xaver Wolfgang von Orsini-Rosenberg and Franz Moritz von Lacy- was a confidant of the future Emperor Joseph II. They often accompanied him in his travels, for example to Italy in 1769. In 1767, and as a reward for his services, Karl Johann Baptist entered in the Austrian branch of the Order of the Golden Fleece as the 782nd Knight since its foundation.

In 1769, Karl Johann received from his father the government of the Bohemian domains, which comprised the north of the whole Dietrichstein heritage, along with the Silesian County of Proskau. Despite his new responsibilities, Karl Johann continue to spend most of his time involved in the court life and the study of Esotericism; in consequence, the administration of his estates was in the hands of his wife Maria Christina. In late 1781 he received from his father the government over the Nikolsburg estate, and one year later, Karl Johann sold his Silesian estates, after the loss of this area in the hands of Prussia.

After the fire which destroyed most of Nikolsburg on 14 September 1784, Karl Johann (who finally inherited the title of Prince of Dietrichstein after the death of his father one month later) moved permanently to the Imperial court in Vienna, while his wife Maria Christina stayed at the castle in Židlochovice, where she died in 1788.

In 1777 Karl Johann was named Austrian Grand Master of the Masonic Lodge. He openly followed the esoteric ways of Freemasonry: from 1780 was active in the Rosicrucianism and sometimes even regarded as the head of this movement in the Habsburg monarchy. In 1784 became the head of a separate Austrian branch.

In Moravia, he founded and led a hunting Order who was called Diana Cacciatrice. The Order members wore a form of miniature hunting corner with a green-white ribbon. The Order met mainly in hunts, and the frequent site of their meetings was Karl Johann's mansion in Kupařovice.

Karl Johann was probably also involved in alchemical experiments. His personal library was fully equipped with Masonic, alchemical and esoteric books. However, many of his activities weren't preserved in Nikolsburg Castle (historian Antonín Luboš mentions only laboratory vessels on alchemy there). A small part of the Masonic personal library of Karl Johann was located in Lipník nad Bečvou after being inherited by his great-granddaughter Gabriele of Dietrichstein, by marriage Countess and later Princess of Hatzfeld-Wildenburg.

The end of Karl Johann's reign was overshadowed by his mental illness. At that time, Europe was involved in the Napoleonic Wars, which also affected Nikolsburg. In 1798 Russian troops led by General Alexander Suvorov passed through Nikolsburg in his way to Italy to fight against the French. The negotiations with the Russians for a safe passage were led by Karl Johann's son, Hereditary Prince Franz Joseph.

In 1801, the Treaty of Lunéville forced Karl Johann to surrender the Imperial County of Tarasp, which became part of Switzerland. In exchange, he received the Swabian district of Neu-Ravensburg.

After the death without issue of his distant cousin Anton Joseph Leslie, Imperial Count Leslie of Balquhain (22 February 1802), Karl Johann inherited his titles and lands. Since then, the full name of the family was Dietrichstein-Proskau-Leslie.

Despite all the historical events that took place during this time, Karl Johann wasn't much concerned about them. Apparently he didn't take care of the administration of his domains and his sons even tried to place him under legal guardianship. However, in 1802 he unexpectedly decided to remarry to the low-born and 29 years younger Maria Anna von Baldtauff.

Jan Karel died in Vienna aged 79. His body is buried in the family crypt in Nikolsburg.

== Marriages and Issue ==
In Vienna on 30 January 1764 Karl Johann Baptist married firstly with Maria Christina Josepha (25 April 1738 – 4 March 1788), a daughter of Jan Josef, Count of Thun und Hohenstein and Marie Christine of Hohenzollern-Hechingen. They had eight children, of whom five survive adulthood:

- Joseph Johann (18 October 1764 – 1765).
- Maria Josepha (7 February 1766 – 2 July 1766).
- Franz Seraph Joseph Carl Johann Nepomuc Quirin (28 April 1767 – 10 July 1854), 8th Prince of Dietrichstein.
- Maria Theresia Johanna Nepomucena Josepha Juliana (11 August 1768 – 16 September 1822), married firstly on 10 November 1787 to Count Philipp Joseph Kinsky von Wchinitz und Tettau (div. 1788) and secondly on 16 February 1807 to Count Maximilian von Merveldt.
- Ludowika Josepha (6 December 1769 – 2 June 1771).
- Johann Baptist Karl (31 March 1772 – 10 March 1852).
- Moritz Joseph Johann (19 February 1775 – 29 August 1864), 10th Prince of Dietrichstein.
- Joseph Franz Johann (28 February 1780 – k.a., Regensburg, 7 January 1801).

In St. Michael, Vienna on 23 July 1802, Karl Johann Baptist married secondly with Maria Anna von Baldtauff (6 February 1757 – 25 February 1815), of lower-born origins. They had no children.

== Ancestry ==
Ancestors of Karl Johann Baptist, Prince of Dietrichstein

16. Maximilian, 2nd Prince of Dietrichstein
8. Ferdinand Joseph, 3rd Prince of Dietrichstein
17. Princess Anna Maria von und zu Liechtenstein
4. Walther Franz Xaver Anton, 5th Prince of Dietrichstein
18. Prince Johann Anton I. of Eggenberg
9. Maria Elisabeth of Eggenberg
19. Anna Maria von Brandenburg-Bayreuth
2. Karl Maximilian, 6th Prince of Dietrichstein
20. Baron Georg Christoph Pruskovsky von Proskau
10. Count Georg Christoph von Proskau
21. Baroness Anna Maria Juliana Kochticky von Kochtitz
5. Countess Karolina Maximiliana von Proskau
22. Count Johann Ambros von Thurn und Valsássina-Como-Vercelli
11. Countess Marie Rosalie von Thurn und Valsássina-Como-Vercelli
23. Countess Beatrix Regina von Thurn-Hofer und Valsassina
1. Karl Johann Baptist, 7th Prince of Dietrichstein
24. Baron Siegmund Khevenhüller
12. Count Johann Ehrenreich Khevenhüller
25. Baroness Siguna Elisabeth zu Stubenberg
6. Count Sigismund Frederick Khevenhüller-Aichelberg
26. Baron Ernst Friedrich von Herberstein
13. Baroness Benigna Rosina zu Herberstein
27. Baroness Anna Regina von Falbenhaupt
3. Countess Maria Anna Josepha Khevenhüller-Aichelberg
28. Count Wolfgang Andreas Orsini-Rosenberg
14. Count Franz Andrä Orsini-Rosenberg
29. Baroness Eva Regina von Welz
7. Countess Ernestine von Orsini-Rosenberg
30. Count Ferdinand Karl zu Löwenstein-Wertheim-Rochefort
15. Countess Amalie Theodora von Löwenstein-Wertheim-Rochefort
31. Countess Anna Maria von Fürstenberg
