= Ferdinand Joseph, Prince of Dietrichstein =

German prince

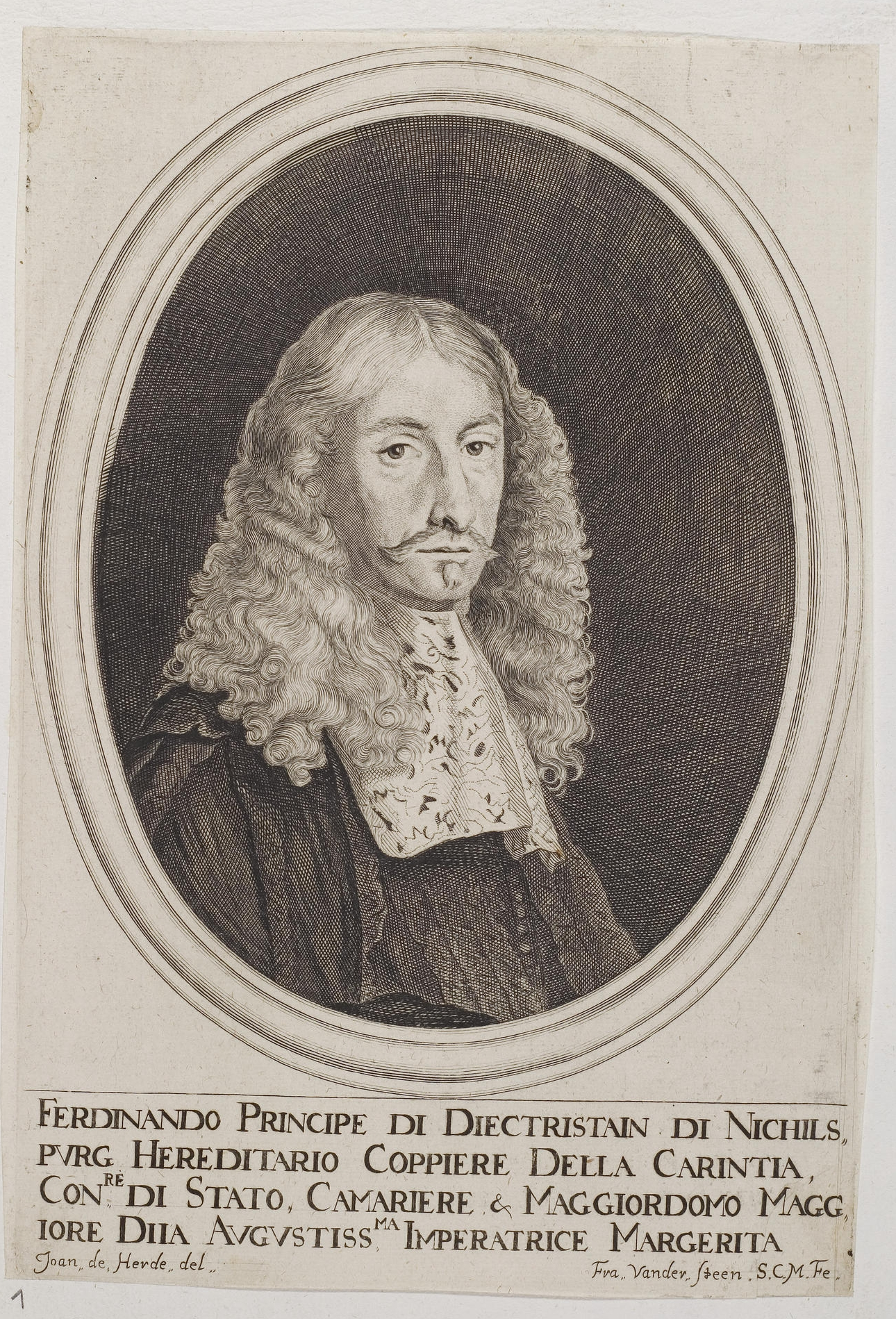
Portrait of Ferdinand Josef by Franciscus van der Steen

Ferdinand Joseph, Prince of Dietrichstein (25 July 1628 – 1 December 1698), was a German prince member of the House of Dietrichstein, 3rd Prince (Fürst) of Dietrichstein zu Nikolsburg, Princely Count (gefürsteter Graf) of Tarasp, Baron (Freiherr) of Hollenburg, Finkenstein and Thalberg; in addition, he served as Lord Chamberlain (Obersthofmeister), Conference Minister (Konferenzminister) and Privy Councillor (Geheimrat) of Emperor Leopold I, and Knight of the Order of the Golden Fleece since 1668.

He belonged to the Austrian noble family of Dietrichstein, whose members, thanks to many years of service to the House of Habsburg, were raised to the rank of imperial barons (Reichfreiherr; in 1514), imperial counts (Reichsgraf; in 1600 and 1612) and finally in 1624 under the laws of primogeniture were raised to the rank of imperial princes (Reichsfürst).

Born in Vienna, he was the seventh child but eldest surviving son of Maximilian, 2nd Prince of Dietrichstein zu Nikolsburg, and his first wife, Princess Anna Maria Franziska of Liechtenstein, a daughter of Karl I, Prince of Liechtenstein, Duke of Troppau and Jägerndorf and his wife, Anna Maria Šemberová of Boskovice and Černá Hora.

After the death of his father in 1655, Ferdinand Joseph succeeded him as 3rd Prince of Dietrichstein zu Nikolsburg, Lord of Nikolsburg (now Mikulov), Polná, Kanitz (now Dolní Kounice), Leipnik (now Lipník nad Bečvou), Weisskirch, Lord of Nußdorf ob der Traisen (with the including districts of Reichersdorf and Franzhausen). He later inherited the Bohemian Lordships of Libochovice, Budyně nad Ohří, Pátek, Nepomyšl and Vlachovo Březí.

== Life ==
=== Offices ===
Like all his ancestors, Ferdinand Joseph was in the service of the House of Habsburg. He received the court offices (Hofamt) of Oberst-Erblandmundschenk in the Duchy of Carinthia and hereditary land-Jägermeister in the Duchy of Styria and later was appointed Kämmerer of Emperor Leopold I and member of the Privy Council.

An important task of Ferdinand Joseph took place in December 1666 on occasion of the marriage of the Emperor with his niece Margaret Theresa, Infanta of Spain and sister of the last King of the Habsburg branch, Charles II. Leopold I appointed him in 1667 Obersthofmeister of the then 15-year-old Empress; this was a great honor, but at the same time was not an easy task: the increasingly anti-Spanish sentiment in the Viennese court because of the inaccessibility of Margaret's entourage, and the pressure under which the Empress was after 6 years of marriage in which she gave birth to 4 children (of which only one daughter survived) and had several miscarriages, damaging her health. Ferdinand Joseph became the Empress' confidant and comforted her, and had to defend her against opposing courtiers who expressed their hope that the ailing Margaret soon die in order that the Emperor could contract a new marriage which could provided him with the long-awaited heir. Finally, the Empress died on 12 March 1673, aged 21. A few months later (15 October), Leopold I married again with his cousin Archduchess Claudia Felicitas of Austria, but Ferdinand Joseph remained in his post of Obersthofmeister for the new Empress.

Since 1668, Ferdinand Joseph was a member of the Order of the Golden Fleece as the Knight 466 since his foundation. In 1682 Emperor Leopold I appointed him his personal Obersthofmeister and became part of the secret Konferenzminister, thus was included in the selected group of not more than 2,000 persons who effectively ruled the Holy Roman Empire. He was able to exert a not inconsiderable influence on government policy; this was because as the Imperial Obersthofmeister he usually had a chair in both the Privy Council and with the Konferenzminister. While many member of the Privy Council are primarily concerned with questions of administration, taxation, privileges, etc., the Konferenzminister are a secret committee created by Leopold I, which consisted of a few (between 4 and 12) members. They are the most important foreign policy advisory body, as they addressed issued for the Imperial House and are responsible for the policy in both the Holy Roman Empire and the Habsburg hereditary lands. At the same time, Ferdinand Joseph as a member of this selected group, reported the outcomes and decisions directly to the Emperor.

However, this wasn't an easy task. The current government policy was subjected to the constant intrigues of court rival parties and, as the most devoutly Catholic court in Europe, the spiritual advice was also fundamental. In addition, the tense international situation caused problems to him: just a year after his appointment in July 1683 took place the second Turkish siege of Vienna by Kara Mustafa Pasha; only thanks to the help of the Polish King Jan III Sobieski and Pope Innocent XI the Imperial capital was saved. In the Great Turkish War, the city of Belgrade was sieged and captured in 1688 and all Hungary was freed by the decisive victory of Prince Eugene of Savoy in the Battle of Zenta, who was the base for the Austrian rise as a major power. On the political level, the resistance of the Hungarian nobility against the Habsburg rule was partially ended with the consent for the coronation of Archduke Joseph, Leopold I's eldest son, as King of Hungary in 1687. In the west, however, King Louis XIV of France was a successful threat for the Empire: in 1683 he capture the imperial city of Strasbourg and in 1688 he entered in the Rhineland, after having devastate the Rhenish Palatinate. The war against France (called the Nine Years' War) began, but had little success. By the Peace of Ryswick in 1697 the Spanish Netherlands where ceded to France.

=== Seat and vote in the Reichstag ===
An important personal event for Ferdinand Joseph was the execution of a pending question for decades: the confirmation of the princely title for the Dietrichstein family. Already in 1624 his great-uncle Franz Seraph (Cardinal since 1599 and Prince-Bishop and Duke of Olomouc since 1600) was elevated to the title of Imperial Prince. His father Maximilian not only received the title in 1629 but also at the Imperial Diet of Regensburg in 1654 obtained the authorization of a seat and vote. This, however, was only provisional, and the confirmation was subject to the condition of the acquisition of a direct imperial territory. Subsequently, however, due to the lack of compliance with the requirement, the princes protested on the Imperial Diet, so Maximilian was virtually excluded from a direct participation. Ferdinand Joseph finally succeeded with the requirement in 1678 with the acquisition of the imperial district of Tarasp in Graubünden, granted by Emperor Leopold I in recognition of his services (incidentally, Tarasp was the last Austrian enclave in Switzerland, and the first who was mediatizated in 1803 and annexed to the Helvetic Republic). The legal issue was finally regulated in the Perpetual Diet of Regensburg on 29 May 1686. Ferdinand Joseph was appointed Austrian ambassador on 4 October 1686 and (this time for good) he received a vote and a seat in the Imperial princely college, between the Princes of Salm and Nassau-Hadamar.

=== Rights of Minting coins ===
Ferdinand Joseph exercised his rights to mint coins at least twice. Are preserved imprints of thalers from the year 1695 and ducats from the year 1696. As a result, there are also contemporary representations of the prince, because on both coins on the front of his chest image with great wig, lace ruff and the Golden Fleece, with the inscription "Ferd. S. R. I. Princeps a Dietrichstein" (Ferdinand Imperial Prince of Dietrichstein) and on the back were adorned with the chain of the Order of the Golden Fleece and the Dietrichstein coat of arms with the inscription "In Nicolspurg et dominus in Trasp" (in Nikolsburg and Lord of Trasp) can be seen.

=== Expansion of possessions ===
Ferdinand Joseph was one of the wealthiest landowners in Austria, but he knew that his fortune -and thus the power base of his house- came from multiplying his lands; in consequence, in 1660 he bought from the heirs of the Count Tilly the Lordship of Reichersdorf, in 1675 the district of Franzhausen and later Nussdorf an der Traisen, all districts in Lower Austria. In 1678 he paid the mortgage of the Lordship of Tarasp and the Emperor granted him (as a special grace) the full sovereignty over this land, and in this way Tarasp obtained the imperial immediacy. Another economically significant event was that his distant cousin (member of the Hollenburg line) Gundakar of Dietrichstein, imperial minister and ambassador, since 1656 Imperial Count and since 1684 Imperial Prince, instituted a Fideikommiss for him, which Ferdinand Joseph inherited in 1690 after Gundakar's death. He also acquired the domains of Libochovice, Budyně nad Ohří, Pátek, Nepomyšl and Vlachovo Březí, all in the today Czech Republic.

=== Social Work ===
Ferdinand Jiseph also used his wealth for social and charitable purposes. His father, as universal heir in 1654 of the Countess Johanna Franziska Magnis, established in her name a school dedicated to the Virgin Mary in Brno. However, the funds originally dedicated for this objective are 60,000 guilders (extracted from the district of Medlanko and Brno) proved to be insufficients, Ferdinand Joseph therefore transferred his rights over the Lordship of Mährisch-Neustadt for the foundation, which finally was completed. Thus, 12 orphaned girls between 12 and 20 years, of which 4 belonged to the Herrenstand, 4 to the Ritterstand and 4 to the Bürgertum received an education and a dowry for their marriages. The prince even established hospitals in Nikolsburg and Libochovice.

== Marriage and issue ==
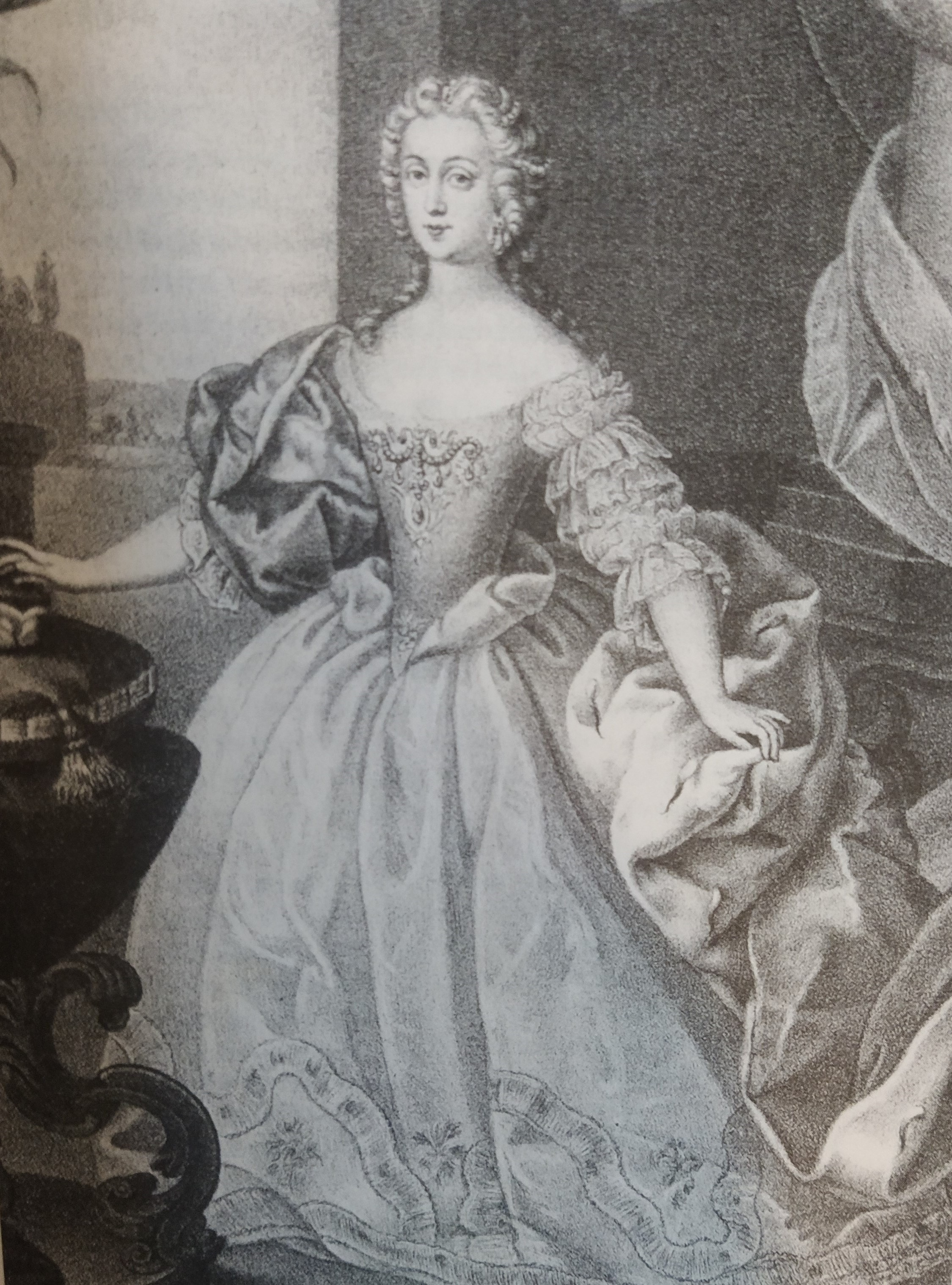
Princess Maria Elisabeth of Eggenberg, Ferdinand Joseph's wife

In Graz on 7 February 1656, Ferdinand Joseph married with Princess Marie Elisabeth of Eggenberg (26 September 1640 – 19 March 1715), eldest child and only surviving daughter of Johann Anton I, Prince of Eggenberg, Duke of Krumau and Princely Count (gefürsteter Graf) of Gradisca and his wife, Margravine Anna Maria of Brandenburg-Bayreuth. Thanks to his marriage (who related him with the House of Hohenzollern) and the unions of his siblings with members of the first noble families of the Habsburg monarchy (including the Houses of Auersperg, Kaunitz, Liechtenstein, Lobkowitz, Montecuccoli, Trauttmandsorff and Schwarzenberg), Ferdinand Joseph acquired an affinity not only with the great dynasties of the Holy Roman Empire, but also with an Imperial House.

Ferdinand Joseph and Marie Elisabeth had twenty children, of whom only five survived to adulthood:

- Anna Maria (2 February 1657 – 21 May 1659).
- Sigmund Franz (21 April 1658 – 26 August 1667).
- Sophia Barbara (10 April 1659 – 21 July 1659).
- Leopold Ignaz Joseph (16 August 1660 – 13 July 1708), 4th Prince of Dietrichstein.
- Erdmuthe Maria Theresia (17 April 1662 – 16 March 1737), married on 16 February 1681 to her first cousin Hans-Adam I, Prince of Liechtenstein.
- Karl Joseph (17 July 1663 – 29 September 1693), married on 16 May 1690 to Countess Elisabeth Helena of Herberstein. No issue.
- Walther Franz Xaver Anton (18 September 1664 – 3 November 1738), 5th Prince of Dietrichstein.
- Franziska (born and died 22 October 1665).
- Maximilian (born and died 25 August 1666).
- Margarete (17 September 1667 – 24 August 1682).
- Maria Aloysia (28 November 1668 – 24 April 1673).
- Wenzel Dominik Lucas (18 October 1670 – 24 April 1673).
- Christian (born and died 5 December 1672).
- Claudia Felizitas Josepha (25 April 1674 – 10 September 1682).
- Maria Josepha Antonia Cajetana Rosa (13 November 1675 – 16 November 1675).
- Ferdinand (born and died October? 1676).
- Maria Charlotte Anna (20 September 1677 – 21 August 1682).
- Jakob Anton (24 July 1678 – 15 May 1721), married firstly in 1709 to Countess Maria Carolina of Wolfsthal and secondly on 23 October 1715 to Countess Maria Franziska Sophia of Starhemberg. Issue in both marriages.
- Raimund Joseph (18 June 1679 – 18 August 1682).
- Dominica Maria Anna (30 July 1685 – 3 March 1694).
