= Moritz, Prince of Dietrichstein =

German prince

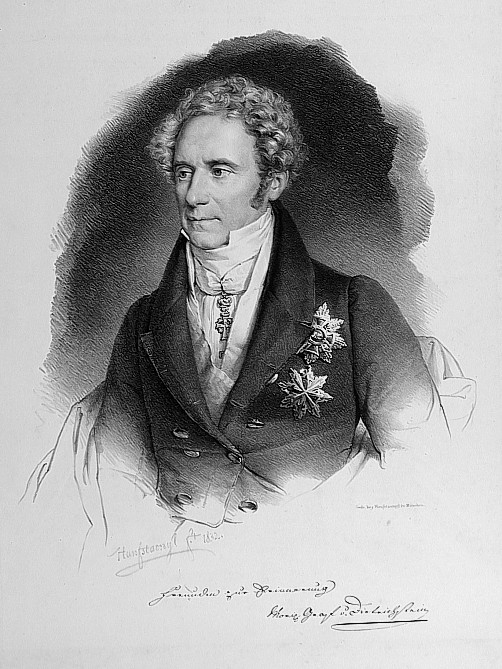
Moritz, Prince of Dietrichstein. Lithograph by Franz Hanfstaengl, 1832.

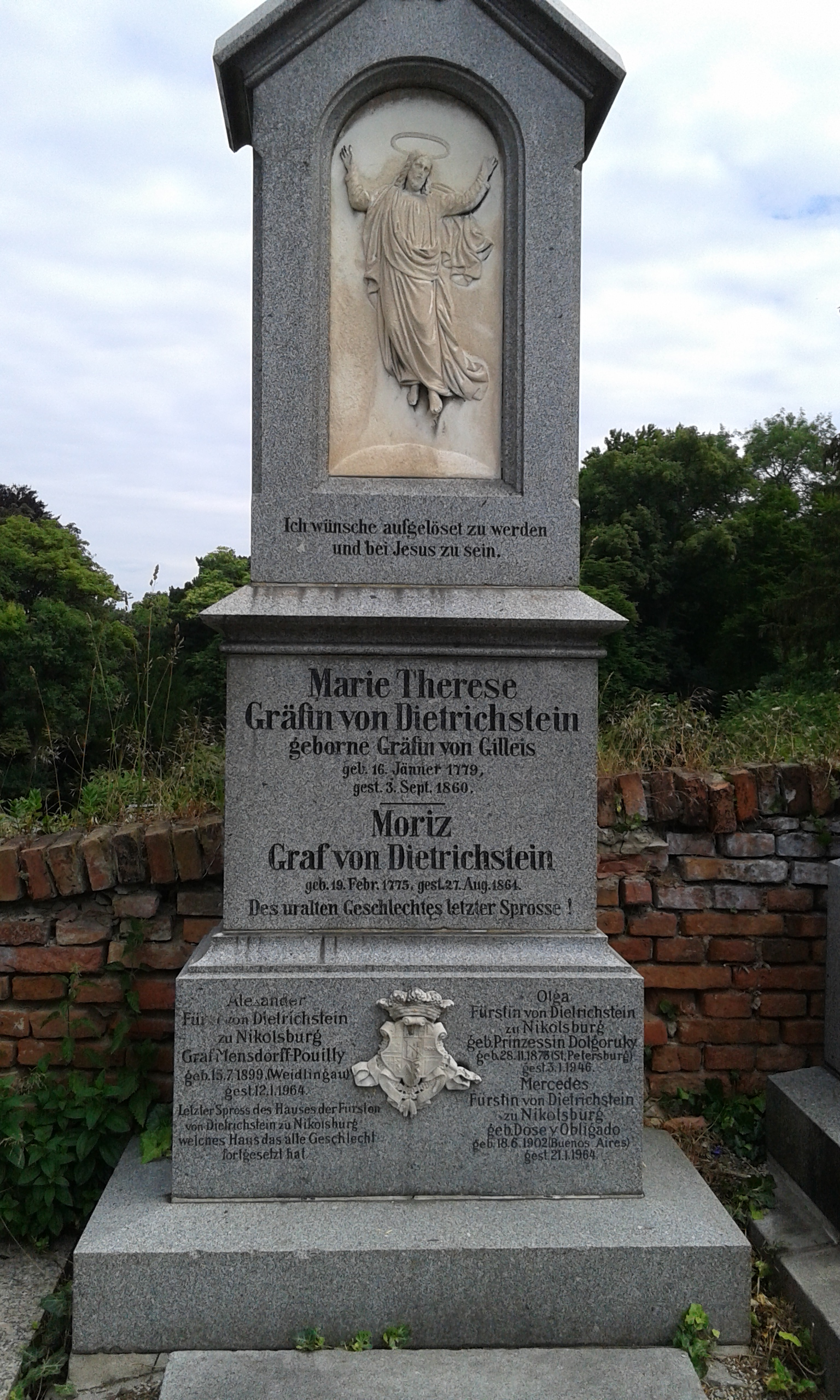
Tomb of Moritz's wife: Countess Maria Theresia von Dietrichstein, née Countess von Gilleis (1779-1860), Vienna (Hietzing)

Moritz, Prince of Dietrichstein (Moritz Joseph Johann; 19 February 1775 – 29 August 1864), was a German prince, member of the House of Dietrichstein, 10th and last Prince (Fürst) of Dietrichstein zu Nikolsburg, Count of Proskau-Leslie, Baron (Freiherr) of Hollenburg, Finkenstein and Thalberg.

== Early life ==
Born in Vienna, he was the seventh child and fourth (but third surviving) son of Karl Johann Baptist, 7th Prince of Dietrichstein, and Countess Maria Christina Josepha of Thun und Hohenstein (1738-1788), eldest daughter of Count Jan Josef Franz Anton of Thun-Hohenstein (1711-1778) and his wife, Countess Maria Christiana of Hohenzollern-Hechingen (1715-1749).

== Biography ==
Being the third son of his family and in consequence without expectations to inheritance, since 1791 Moritz entered in the Austrian military service. In 1798 was named Adjutant of General Karl Mack von Leiberich in Naples, where he was captured with his master by the French, and after his release he participated the campaign in Ulm (1805).

In 1815 Moritz was appointed tutor of the Duke of Reichstadt (Napoleon II) and later was named Director of the Imperial Court Theatre (Burgtheater) and Library (Kaiserlichen Bibliothek), in 1845 was named Oberstkämmerer until 1848, when he retired from public offices.

Like his older brother, Prince Franz Joseph, he was an opponent of Metternich politics. Beethoven was very encouraged by him. In 1838 Moritz acquired for the Imperial Court Library the autograph score of Mozart's Requiem. Even as a Director of the Coins and Antique Cabinets (Münz- u. Antikenkabinetts) during 1833-1848 he rendered great services, composing songs, dances and minuets. In 1834 he was elected an honorary member of the Bavarian Academy of Sciences and Humanities (Bayerische Akademie der Wissenschaften).

After the death of his nephew, Joseph Franz on 10 July 1858, Moritz succeeded him as 10th Prince of Dietrichstein.

Moritz died in Vienna aged 89, and was buried at Hietzinger cemetery, grave 06, no. 15. Because his only son died before him and without issue, with Moritz ended the Dietrichstein family in male line. Four years later, in late 1868, Count Alexander of Mensdorff-Pouilly (husband of Moritz' grand-niece), obtained from the Emperor the title of Prince of Dietrichstein-Nikolsburg, thus reviving the title of his wife's family.

== Marriage and issue ==
In Vienna on 22 September 1800, Moritz married with Countess Maria Theresia of Gilleis (16 January 1779 – 3 September 1860), a daughter of Johann Christoph Julius, Count of Gilleis (d. 1782) and his wife, Countess Maria Anna von Spindler (d. 1802). They had five children, of whom only two survive adulthood:

- Moritz Johann (4 July 1801 – 15 October 1852), married on 16 June 1842 to Countess Sophia Potocka (1820-1882). They didn't have children.
- Karl (1802 – 1803), died as a toddler
- Ida (24 August 1804 – 15 April 1822).
- Alexander (10 June 1806 – 6 September 1806), died as a baby
- Julie Franziska Leopoldina Cara (12 August 1807 – 22 April 1883), married on 18 May 1831 to Prince Karl of Oettingen-Wallerstein (1796-1871). They had five children (one son: Moritz, and four daughters: Therese, Eleonore, Anna and Sophie).

== Sources ==
- Karl Otmar Freiherr von Aretin: Dietrichstein, Moritz Johann Carl Joseph Georg Graf von, [in:] Neue Deutsche Biographie, vol. 3, Duncker & Humblot, Berlin 1957, p. 702 online.
- Franz Philipp von Sommaruga: Dietrichstein, Moritz Graf von, [in:] Allgemeine Deutsche Biographie, vol. 5, Duncker & Humblot, Leipzig 1877, pp. 204–206.
- Franz Carl Weidmann: Moriz Graf von Dietrichstein. Sein Leben und Wirken, aus seinen hinterlassenen Papieren dargestellt, Braumüller, Vienna 1867
- Constantin von Wurzbach: Dietrichstein-Proskau-Leslie, Moritz I. Graf von, [in:] Biographisches Lexikon des Kaiserthums Oesterreich, vol. 3 (1858), p. 304.
- Dietrichstein zu Nikolsburg Moritz I. Josef Johann Fürst, [in:] Österreichisches Biographisches Lexikon 1815–1950, vol. 1, Austrian Academy of Sciences, Vienna 1957, p. 185.
