= Franz Joseph, Prince of Dietrichstein =

German prince (1767–1854)

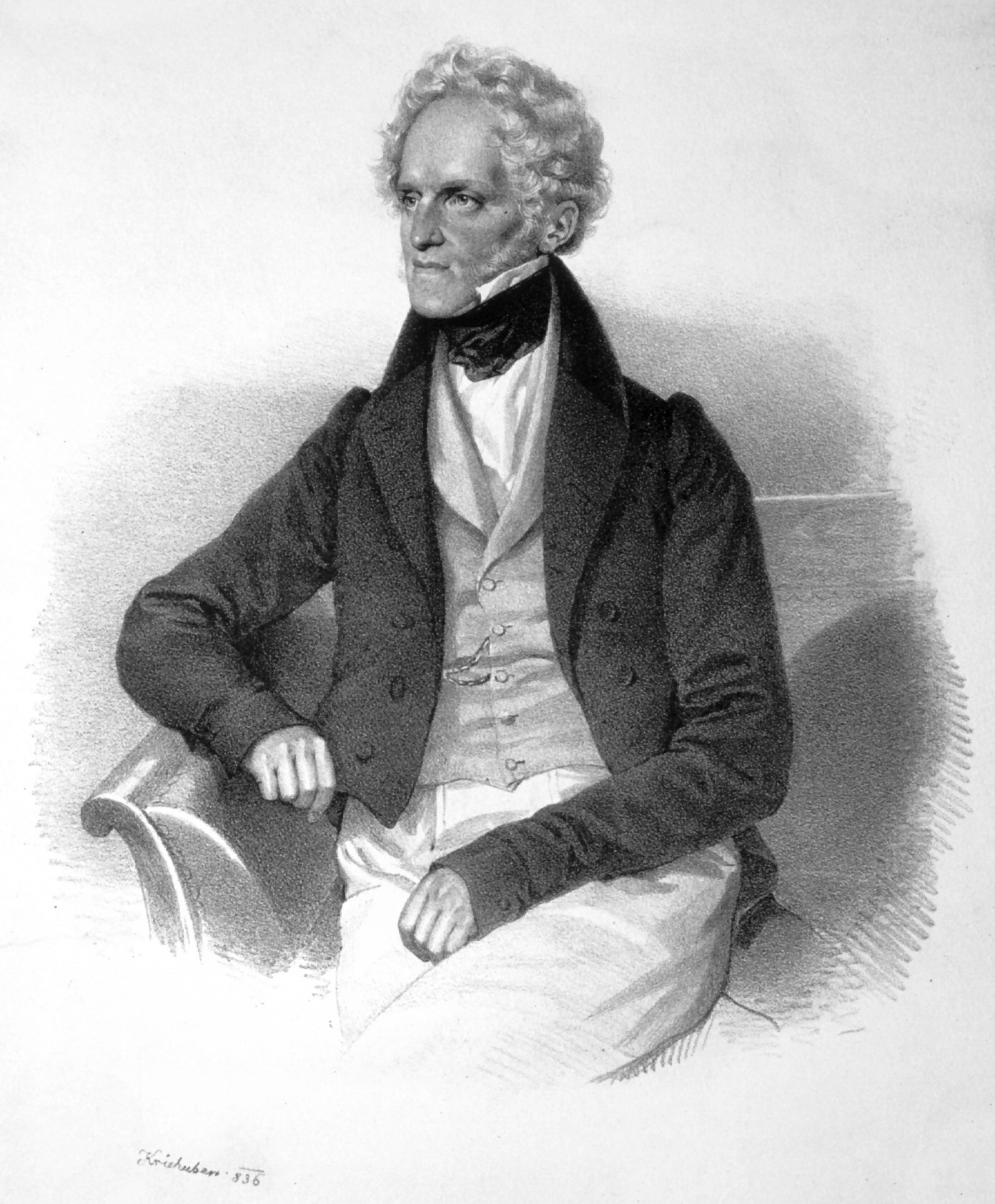
Franz Joseph, Prince of Dietrichstein. Lithograph by Josef Kriehuber, 1836.

Franz Joseph, Prince of Dietrichstein (Franz Seraph Joseph Carl Johann Nepomuc Quirin; 28 April 1767 – 10 July 1854), was a German prince, member of the House of Dietrichstein, Major general, 8th Prince (Fürst) of Dietrichstein zu Nikolsburg, Count of Proskau-Leslie, Baron (Freiherr) of Hollenburg, Finkenstein and Thalberg.

== Early life ==
Born in Nikolsburg, he was the third child and second (but eldest surviving) son of Karl Johann Baptist, 7th Prince of Dietrichstein, and Countess Maria Christina Josepha of Thun und Hohenstein (1738–1788), eldest daughter of Count Jan Josef Franz Anton of Thun-Hohenstein (1711–1778) and his wife, Countess Maria Christiana of Hohenzollern-Hechingen (1715–1749).

== Biography ==
He was educated at Nikolsburg Castle by provost Jean du Four, an en-lightener and friend of his mother, who gave Franz Joseph an open mind and heart.

Once finished his studies, Franz Joseph began his military career in the engineer corps, in which he joined as a Lieutenant at the age of 20. In March 1788 he was promoted to the rank of Captain and in September 1789 he was appointed Major and adjutant of Albert of Saxony, Duke of Teschen. During the attack to the fortress of Valenciennes on 25 July 1793 on his own initiative, he assaulted the main enemy column and was among the firsts who fought fiercely, and then managed to defend his position with a rapìd procedure, significantly contributed with the rapid surrender of the fortress. For his performance, in 1796 he was named a Knight of the Military Order of Maria Theresa, and shortly after he was promoted to the rank of Major General and began a diplomatic career as an ambassador, working successively at the courts of Berlin, Munich and later in St. Petersburg, where he managed to convince Tsar Paul I of the necessity of his military aid against Napoleon.

Franz Joseph inherited the title of Prince of Dietrichstein after his father's death on 25 May 1808; as the owner of the wealthy Fideikommiss who belonged to his family after the death of Prince Gundacar (from the Hollenburg line) in 1690 and his own family domains (from the Nikolsburg branch), he also entered in the possession of the hereditary Erbamt, who allowed him to took place in official court ceremonies, like royal and imperial coronations.

As an Imperial-Royal Kämmerer and member of the Privy Council, he served in the Austrian Army as Major general and accorded in 1800 with the French General Jean Victor Marie Moreau the Parsdorf Ceasefire, which was formally signed in the town of Vaterstetten, which later came to an end with the Battle of Hohenlinden.

In 1809 he was appointed as Obersthofmeister of Archduke Francis Joseph Charles of Austria, later Duke of Modena, and in this function he acted as Hofkommissar in the enemy-occupied part of Galicia until the Congress of Vienna.

As a benefactor of the poor of the city of Vienna, he was made an honorary citizen. In 1815 he was appointed a member of the Academy of Sciences of Erfurt (Akademie gemeinnütziger Wissenschaften zu Erfurt).

As the owner of the district Neu-Ravensburg in the Württemberg Oberamt Wangen, he was, from 1815 to 1819, a member of the assemblies of estates of the Kingdom of Württemberg, and from 1820 to 1829, a member of the Estates of Württemberg. The sale of the direct rule of Neu-Ravensburg to Württemberg was determined in July 1829, but he never resigned in person, but was represented by other members of the chamber.

Franz Joseph's political views can be described as liberal and progressive in his day. The prince led an unconventional, free lifestyle and sired several illegitimate children, including the famous pianist Sigismund Thalberg.

== Marriage and issue ==
In Pavlovsk, Saint Petersburg on 16 July 1797, Franz Joseph married with Countess Alexandra Andrejevna Shuvalova (19 December 1775 – 10 November 1847), a daughter of the senator and writer Count Andrei Petrovich Shuvalov by his wife, Countess Ekaterina Petrovna Saltykova. The union, who proved to be extremely unhappy, only produced a son:

- Joseph Franz (28 March 1798 – 10 July 1858), 9th Prince of Dietrichstein.

== Ancestry ==
Ancestors of Franz Joseph, Prince of Dietrichstein

16. Ferdinand Joseph, 3rd Prince of Dietrichstein
8. Walther Franz Xaver Anton, 5th Prince of Dietrichstein
17. Maria Elisabeth of Eggenberg
4. Karl Maximilian, 6th Prince of Dietrichstein
18. Count Georg Christoph von Proskau
9. Countess Karolina Maximiliana von Proskau
19. Countess Marie Rosalie von Thurn-Valsassina-Como-Vercelli
2. Karl Johann Baptist, 7th Prince of Dietrichstein
20. Count Johann Ehrenreich Khevenhüller
10. Count Sigismund Frederick Khevenhüller-Aichelberg
21. Baroness Benigna Rosina zu Herberstein
5. Countess Maria Anna Josepha Khevenhüller-Aichelberg
22. Count Franz Andrä Orsini-Rosenberg
11. Countess Ernestine von Orsini-Rosenberg
23. Countess Amalie Theodora von Löwenstein-Wertheim
1. Franz Joseph, 8th Prince of Dietrichstein
24. Count Maximilian Thun-Hohenstein
12. Count Johann Franz Joseph Thun-Hohenstein
25. Princess Marie von und zu Liechtenstein
6. Count Johann Joseph Franz Thun-Hohenstein
26. Count Aloys Thomas Raimund von Harrach zu Rohrau und Thannhausen
13. Countess Maria Philippine Harrach zu Rohrau
27. Countess Maria Barbara of Sternberg
3. Countess Maria Christina Josepha Thun–Hohenstein
28. Philipp, Prince of Hohenzollern-Hechingen
14. Count Hermann Friedrich von Hohenzollern-Hechingen
29. Markgrave Marie Sidonie von Baden-Rodemachern
7. Countess Marie Christine von Hohenzollern-Hechingen
30. Prince Franz Albrecht von Oettingen-Spielberg
15. Countess Josepha von Oettingen zu Spielberg
31. Baroness Johanna Margaretha von Schwendi
