= Patek =

Patek may refer to:

- Patek (surname)
- Pátek, a village and municipality in the Czech Republic
- Patek, Iran, a village in Iran
- Patek, a single and song from Pluto × Baby Pluto

== See also ==
- Patek Philippe, Swiss watchmaker
- Petek (disambiguation)
