= Leopold Joseph =

Leopold Joseph may refer to:

- Leopold, Duke of Lorraine (1679–1729)
- Leopold Ignaz Joseph, Prince of Dietrichstein
- Archduke Leopold Joseph of Austria (1700-1701)
- Archduke Leopold Joseph of Austria (1682-1684)
- Leopold Joseph, a British merchant bank acquired by Butterfield Bank
