= Petel =

Petel is a surname. Notable people with the surname include:

- Anne-Laurence Petel (born 1970), French politician
- David Petel (1921–2019), Israeli politician
- Georg Petel (1601/02–1635), German sculptor

== See also ==
- Petek (disambiguation)
- Peter (surname)
