= Jakob Anton of Dietrichstein =

German prince

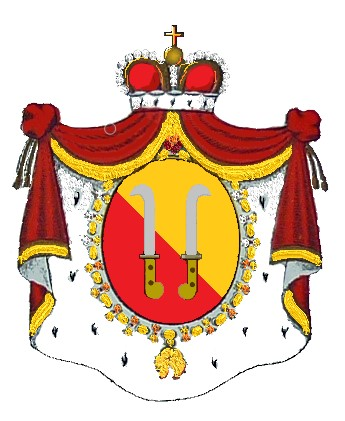
Dietrichstein Coat of arms

Jakob Anton of Dietrichstein (24 July 1678 – 15 May 1721) was a German prince member of the House of Dietrichstein.

He was eighteenth child and ninth (but fourth surviving) son of Ferdinand Joseph, 3rd Prince of Dietrichstein, and Marie Elisabeth, a daughter of Johann Anton I, Prince of Eggenberg, Duke of Český Krumlov and Princely Count (gefürsteter Graf) of Gradisca d'Isonzo.

== Life ==
As the youngest surviving son of his family, Jakob Anton had no chances to inherit a substantial part of the Dietrichstein heritage, due to the institution of the primogeniture.

In 1709, Jakob Anton married firstly with Countess Maria Carolina of Wolfsthal (d. in childbirth, 15 January 1711). They had two children:

- Maria Elisabeth (12 October 1709 – 1730).
- Leopold Philipp (15 January 1711 – 8 March 1773), married ca. 12 May 1728 to Countess Maria Theresia of Althann. No issue.

On 23 October 1715, Jakob Anton married secondly with Maria Anna Franziska Magdalena Sophia (1 September 1688 – 1 December 1757), a daughter of Gundackar XVI, Count of Starhemberg-Schaunberg and Maria Anna of Rappach. They had five children:

- Guidobald Joseph (9 December 1717 – 29 February 1772).
- Erdmuth Theresia (19 December 1718 – 16 March 1723).
- Franz Anton (19 February 1720 – 19 April 1723).
- Christine Gottfricai (17 March 1721 – died young aft. 1721).
- Maria Karoline (posthumously 17 February 1722 – 23 July 1790), married on 2 February 1744 to Leopold Anton, Altgrave of Salm-Reifferscheidt-Hainspach.
