= Dietrichstein tomb =

Church building in Mikulov, Czech Republic

Coordinates: 48°48′24″N 16°38′22″E

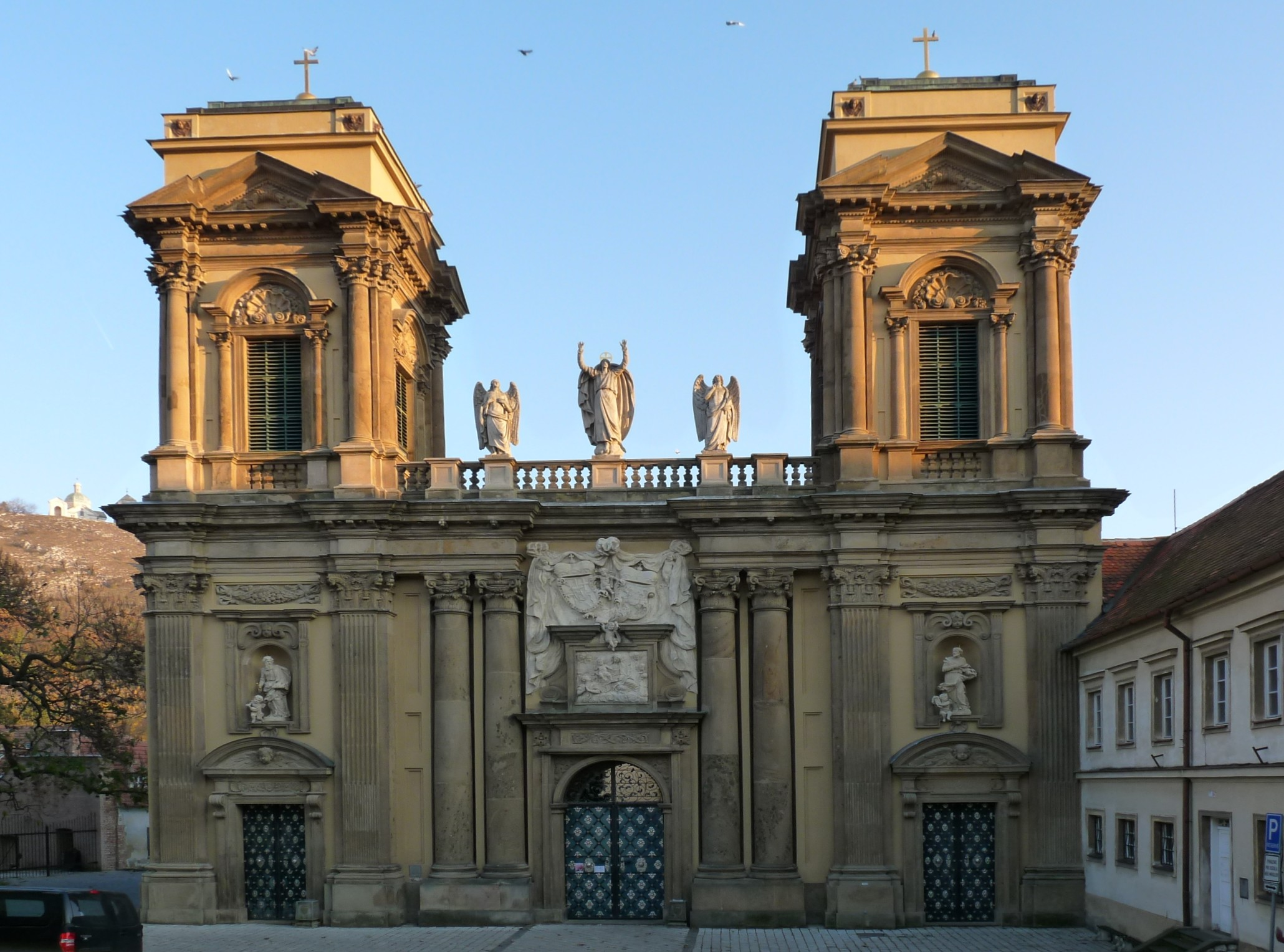
Dietrichstein tomb

The Dietrichstein tomb (Czech: Ditrichštejnská hrobka) is a tomb of the Dietrichstein family in Mikulov in the South Moravian Region of the Czech Republic. The structure was built as a copy of the Holy House of Loreto, and later the Church of St. Anne was added over the chapel.

The building contains a courtyard, grave chapel, two aisles with coffins and stairs in the south tower.

== History ==
In 1623, under license from the Pope, construction began on the chapel for the nearby Capuchin Monastery, established by Cardinal Franz von Dietrichstein in 1611. Cardinal brought from the Italian Loretto to Moravia three wooden statues of Black Madonna, one of them he placed into this chapel, which ground stone was posed in 1625. Above the chapel a church consecrated to St. Anne was built by the Cardinal's successor Maximilian Dietrichstein, completed in 1656. The Dietrichsteins have been buried under the Loreto Church since the late 17th century.

The construction of the Loreto Church was carried out according to plans by Giovanni Giacomo Tencalla, the Italian architect who constructed the castles in Lednice and Valtice for the Liechtensteins. The stucco decoration in the former presbytery and in Náchod chapel is the work of his brother Giovanni Tencalla.

The stone façade dates from 1700. The original single-tower façade was reconstructed by Leopold Dietrichstein. It was designed by Viennese architect Johann Bernhard Fischer von Erlach in a Roman monumental Baroque style. Statues of Christ the Saviour among two angels on the top of attica come from the middle of the 19th century.

The building next to St. Anne΄s, joined at a right angle, was built in 1652 as a sacristy for the church and the jewellery belonging to the Loretto's Madonna. The treasury consisted of the Madonna's wardrobe, gold and silver jewels. Opposite the sacristy, at Vrchlického street Num 1,3, stand three baroque Canon houses, former belonging to the canons, who looked after the church.

The Náchod chapel of the church belonged to the Moravian Baron family from Náchod, who owned the estate near Mikulov. The cupola of this chapel with rich stucco decoration in the Roman Baroque style, and two oblong walls, is all, that remained of its original appearance.

On 14 September 1784 a highly destructive fire broke out in the vicinity of the Loreto Church. The entire northern part of the square burnt down, together with the Loreto Church and the Capuchin Monastery. The monastery was never rebuilt, and the Loreta Church remained a ruin until 1745. The coffins, the wooden statue of Black Madonna and the Loreta treasury were salvaged and removed to the Church of St. Wenceslaus in Mikulov. Later the contents of the treasury were sold at auction.

The ruins of the Loreto Church were rebuilt by Franz Joseph, Prince of Dietrichstein, in 1846 as the Dietrichstein tomb with chapel of St. Anne, according to plans of Austrian architect Heinrich Koch. Statues of St. Anne and St. Leopold were made by Vincenz Pilz. The collapsed vault of the church nave was not rebuilt, and its area became a courtyard.

In the middle of the courtyard stands a marble statue of Franz Joseph I, Prince of Dietrichstein, made and signed by Emanuel Max, dated 1859. The former presbytery became a funeral chapel with the Empire façade.

45 members of the Dietrichstein family are buried in the tomb.

== Present ==
The Dietrichstein tomb is protected as a cultural monument. It is open to the public. The permanent exhibition in the tomb is entitled "From the Holy House of Loreto to the Dietrichstein burial church". The building also serves as a gallery.
