= Leopold Ignaz Joseph, Prince of Dietrichstein =

German prince

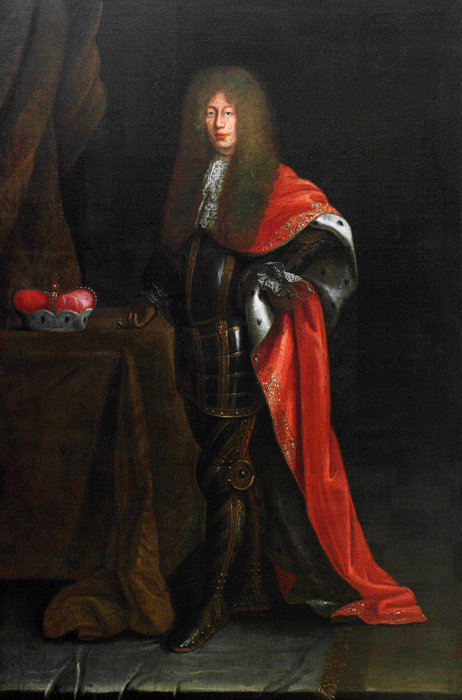
Portrait of Leopold Ignaz Joseph, Prince of Dietrichstein.

Leopold Ignaz Joseph, Prince of Dietrichstein (16 August 1660 – 13 July 1708), was a German prince member of the House of Dietrichstein, 4th Prince (Fürst) of Dietrichstein zu Nikolsburg, Princely Count (gefürsteter Graf) of Tarasp, Baron (Freiherr) of Hollenburg, Finkenstein and Thalberg.

He was the third child and second (but eldest surviving) son of Ferdinand Joseph, 3rd Prince of Dietrichstein, and Princess Marie Elisabeth of Eggenberg (1640–1715), the daughter of Johann Anton I, Prince of Eggenberg, Duke of Krumlov and Princely Count (gefürsteter Graf) of Gradisca d'Isonzo.

== Life ==
After his older brother Sigmund Franz on 26 August 1667 left him as the new Hereditary Prince (Erbprinz), Leopold Ignaz Joseph had an aristocratic and chivalrous upbringing, during which he resided some time in Paris, where he acquired the pomp and extravagant attitude after whom he was remembered in later generations.

After returning to the Imperial court, Leopold Ignaz Joseph was named Privy Councillor. Due to the high position and authority of his father, Prince Ferdinand Joseph, at court, he had great hopes and expectations for his future. However, these hopes were not fulfilled. Historian Rostislav Smíšek refers to some rumours about the young prince that circulated at court, which in 1685 completely stopped the progress of Leopold Ignaz Joseph in the political hierarchy. Prince Ferdinand Joseph managed to protect his son, but his career was halted for a long time: for many years, he only had the functions of Kämmerer and Privy Councillor.

In 1698, shortly after he assumed the title of Prince of Dietrichstein following his father's death, Leopold Ignaz Joseph was named Knight of the Order of the Golden Fleece as the Knight 591 since his foundation. His first high appointment took place only in 1705, when he was named a member of the Imperial Chamber. His renewed career was stopped by his early death in 1708 at the age of 48, from tuberculosis.

== Marriage and issue ==
On 13 July 1687 Leopold Ignaz married with Princess Maria Godofreda Dorothea of Salm (29 September 1667 – 19 January 1732), daughter of Charles Theodore Otto, Prince of Salm by his first wife, Countess Godofreda Maria Anna of Huyn (1646–1667). Being the only child of her parents, Maria Godofreda inherited from her mother the Counties of Geleen, Amstenrald and Wachtendonk.

Leopold Ignaz and Maria Godofreda had two daughters:

- Maria Anna Josepha (25 June 1688 – January 1697).
- Maria Josepha Felizitas (13 September 1694 – 7 March 1711).

Because he died without male heirs, Leopold Ignaz was succeeded by his younger surviving brother Walther Franz Xaver Anton.

== Ancestry ==
Ancestors of Leopold Ignaz Joseph, Prince of Dietrichstein

16. Baron Adam von Dietrichstein
8. Count Sigismund of Dietrichstein
17. Margareta Folch de Cardona y Requesens
4. Maximilian, 2nd Prince of Dietrichstein
18. Baron Hans Warmund von der Leiter
9. Baroness Johanna von der Leiter
19. Baroness Elisabeth von Thurn
2. Ferdinand Joseph, 3rd Prince of Dietrichstein
20. Baron Hartmann von und zu Liechtenstein
10. Karl I, Prince of Liechtenstein
21. Countess Anna Maria von Ortenburg
5. Princess Anna Maria von und zu Liechtenstein
22. Baron Jan Šembera von Boskowitz and Černá Hora
11. Baroness Anna Maria Šemberová of Boskovice and Černá Hora
23. Baroness Anna Krajířová von Krajk
1. Leopold Ignaz Joseph, 4th Prince of Dietrichstein
24. Baron Seyfried von Eggenberg
12. Prince Hans Ulrich von Eggenberg
25. Anna Benigna Galler von Schwanberg
6. Prince Johann Anton I. of Eggenberg
26. Baron Konrad von Thannhausen
13. Baroness Maria Sidonia von Thannhausen
27. Dorothea von Teuffenbach
3. Maria Elisabeth of Eggenberg
28. John George, Elector of Brandenburg
14. Christian, Margrave of Brandenburg-Bayreuth
29. Princess Elisabeth of Anhalt-Zerbst
7. Anna Maria von Brandenburg-Bayreuth
30. Albert Frederick, Duke of Prussia
15. Marie of Prussia
31. Marie Eleonore of Cleves
