= Marie Elizabeth =

Marie Elizabeth or Elisabeth may refer to:

== People ==
- Marie-Elisabeth Belpaire (1853–1948), Belgian writer and activist
- Marie Elizabeth Amy Castilla (1868–1898), Australian physician
- Marie-Elizabeth Cléry (1762–1811), French harpist and composer
- Marie-Élisabeth Gabiou (1761–1811), French artist
- Marie Elizabeth Hayes (1874–1908), Irish medical missionary
- Marie-Elisabeth Hecker (born 1987), German cellist
- Marie E. Howe, American politician
- Marie Elizabeth Kachel Bucher (1909–2008), teacher
- Marie Elizabeth de LaFite (1737–1794), Dutch translator and author
- Marie Elizabeth Levens (born 1950), former foreign minister of Suriname
- Marie-Elisabeth Lüders (1878–1966), German politician
- Marie Elisabeth zu Mecklenburg (1646–1713), princess abbess of Gandersheim Abbey
- Marie-Elisabeth Polier, Swiss journalist and translator
- Marie-Elisabeth Simons (1754–1774), Belgian artist
- Marie-Élisabeth Turgeon (1840–1881), beatified Canadian religious sister
- Marie Elisabeth of France (1752–1578), daughter of Charlex IX of France
- Marie Elisabeth Veys (born 1981), Belgian judoka
- Marie-Elizabeth-Louise Vigee-Lebrun (1755–1842), French artist
- Marie Elisabeth Wrede (1898–1981), Austrian painter
- Marie Elizabeth Zakrzewska (1829–1902), German born physician
- Marie Elisabeth of Brunswick-Wolfenbüttel (1638–1687)
- Marie Elisabeth of Hesse-Darmstadt (1656–1715)
- Marie Elisabeth, Abbess of Quedlinburg (1678–1755)

== Ships ==
- MV Marie Elizabeth, an Algerian owned, Panamanian flagged coaster in service 1975-76
