= Franz Carl Weidmann =

Austrian writer, actor and journalist

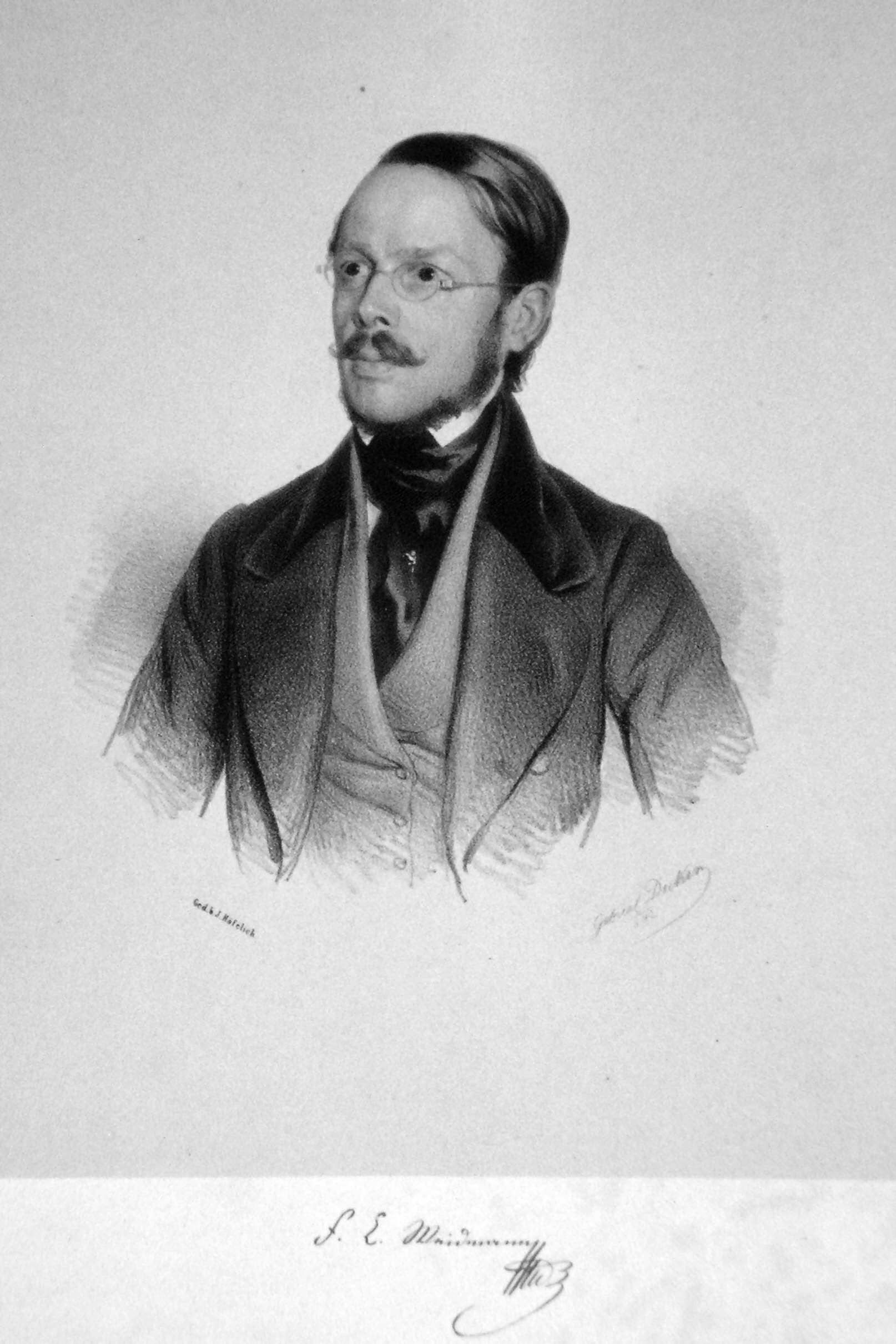
Franz Carl Weidmann lithograph by Gabriel Decker, 1842

Franz Carl Weidmann (1787 or 1788 – 28 January 1867) was an Austrian writer, actor and journalist.

== Life and work ==
Born in Vienna, Weidmann was the son of the actor and writer Joseph Weidmann (1742–1810) and nephew of the playwright Paul Weidmann (1746–1810). Since he wasn't particularly talented as an actor, he voluntarily ended his father's initiated engagement at the Wiener Hoftheater and got a small pension for it till the end of his life. As a freelance writer he gained some recognition because of his modest, unobtrusive manner, among others by his Sämmtliche Werke; published from 1821 to 1822, the first volume with four historical dramas, the second with poetry, and the third with the Memorabilien aus meiner Reisetasche.

Thanks to the support of Archduke Johann, from this third volume onwards he wrote in particular descriptions of the surroundings of Vienna and the Austrian Alpine landscapes, Dalmatia and Montenegro with a mixture of topographical information and his own inventions. However, his good friend Adolf Bäuerle, in whose Wiener Theaterzeitung he wrote some theatre reviews, noted that Weidmann never got out of the Österreichischen Erblanden, so that many of his travelogues would have originated only from fantasy, namely the announced descriptions of Egypt and Syria. Bäuerle brought this to the point:

He's travelled the world in the seven-league boots of lies. When he talks about his travels and goes beyond Austria and Styria, no Sylbe can be believed.

He was more successful as a Viennese chronicler, reporter, obituarist, and theatre and art critic who worked for decades. As a journalistic "girl Friday", his contemporary nickname, he published the Oesterreichischer Zuschauer in 1854 after the death of Josef Sigmund Ebersberg, even if only for a short time. Mainly he wrote reviews for the aforementioned Wiener Theaterzeitung, Johann Schickh's Wiener Zeitschrift für Kunst, Literatur, Theater und Mode and other magazines. As a reviewer he was prolific. He wrote about theatre and opera performances, painting, sculpture, fashion, and industrial architecture. Nevertheless, there was no financial success for the rest of his life, so he had to live off his small pension as an actor. At an advanced age he claimed to have been born six to seven years earlier and therefore older. His funeral expenses were paid by an unknown high-ranking personality at his written request.

Weidmann was a member of the famous Viennese artist society "Die Ritter von der grünen Insel" (The Knights of the Green Island), to which the composer Franz von Suppé, the painter Eduard Swoboda and the Burgtheater actor Konrad Adolf Hallenstein belonged, under the direction of the playwright Otto Prechtler, along with many other artists.

== Plays ==
- Sieg, Freiheit und Friede. Eine allegorische Scene (1815), party on the occasion of the German Campaign of 1813.
- Clementine von Aubigny (1817), dramatic poem, debut performance by Sophie Schröder
- Die Scharfenecker, also Der Verbannte (1821), play (performed in October 1823 at Munich Isartortheater)
- Die Geächteten (1823), drama (performed in Prague in 1824)
- Das Pilgerhaus auf dem Bernhardsberge (1826), drama premiered in Theater an der Wien.
- Das Dauernde im Wechsel (1828), drama premiered in Theater in der Josefstadt.
- Der Ring des Glückes (1833), Zauberspiel with singing and dancing, performed in Theater in der Josefstadt.
- Till Eulenspiegel, play in 5 acts after Karl August Lebrun, published in 1837 in Mainz.
- Maximilian Korn. Sein Leben und künstlerisches Wirken (1857), Biography of this Burgtheater actor.
- Moritz, Prince of Dietrichstein. Sein Leben und Wirken aus seinen hinterlassenen Papieren dargestellt (1867), biography of the officer and court official - this was Weidmann's last literary work.
