= Petek =

Petek may refer to:

- Petek (surname)
- Petek, Kayapınar, a village in Diyarbakır Province, Turkey
- Petek, Murgul, a village in Artvin Province, Turkey
- Petek, the Hungarian name of Petecu village, Ulieș Commune, Harghita County, Romania
- The Petek, "The Note," a piece of paper revealing the Hebrew phrase and song Na Nach Nachma Nachman Meuman

== See also ==
- Patek (disambiguation)
