= Patek (surname) =

Patek is a surname with multiple etymologies. In the Czech language, it is spelled Pátek (feminine: Pátková), meaning 'Friday'. Notable people with the surname include:

- Adolf Patek (1900–1982), Austrian footballer
- Antoni Patek (1811–1877), Polish watchmaker
- Artur Patek (born 1965), Polish historian
- Freddie Patek (born 1944), American baseball player
- Jarmila Pátková (born 1953), Czech rower
- Jewell Patek (born 1971), American politician
- Kristýna Pátková (born 1998), Czech ice hockey player
- Maria Patek (born 1958), Austrian civil servant
- Rebecca Patek, American choreographer
- Stanisław Patek (1866–1944), Polish diplomat
- Umar Patek (born 1970), Indonesian terrorist

== See also ==
- Petek (surname)
