= Marie Elizabeth de LaFite =

Dutch translator and author (1737–1794)

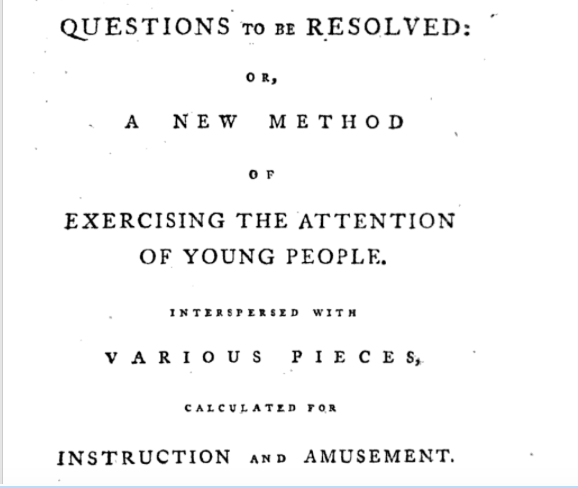
- The English translation's front cover of LaFite's original work Questions to be Resolved.
- Born: 21 August 1737; Hamburg, Holy Roman Empire
- Died: 1794 (aged 56–57); London, England
- Occupation(s): Translator and author
- Spouse: Jean-Daniel de La Fite
- Children: 2

Marie Elizabeth de LaFite (1737–1794) was a translator and author who worked as a Dutch governess before serving Queen Charlotte of England during the tumultuous years of the French Revolution.

== Personal life ==
She was born in Hamburg, Holy Roman Empire on 21 August 1737, to Jean Alexandre Boué and Marie-Elisabeth Cottin. She traveled for many years and in 1768 she married Jean-Daniel de La Fite (1719–1781), the Huguenot minister of the Walloon Church at The Hague. Jean-Daniel was also chaplain to the house of Orange for over a decade. In 1770, she gave birth to a girl, Marguerite Emelie Elise, and in 1773, had a son, Henri François Alexandre. In the same year her son was born, Marie Elizabeth de LaFite began her literary career by translating the German Mlle de Sternheim, by Sophie da La Roche, into French. While this was her first published work, LaFite had previously helped her husband create a scholarly periodical which focused on health and wellness for the poor called Bibliothèque des Sciences et des Beaux Arts. Her next work came in 1775 when she wrote critiques and essays for a few years before she began producing educational books in 1778, which she is most known for.

In 1781, both her father and husband died, leaving her in need of work as she was not a particularly wealthy widow. De Richemond quoted a letter to her sister in which Marie Elizabeth acknowledged her need to work and make a living for herself. She moved to London with her daughter Elise, where she gained employment under Queen Charlotte as a reader and lady-companion to the three eldest princesses. This was not the first time the English monarchy had brought in foreign women writer to join the court. About 20 years before, Jeanne Leprince de Beaumont was invited into King George III father's inner circle, setting an example for women like LaFite who was invited to London by George’s wife Charlotte.

In London, her most famous work, Questions to be Resolved: or, A New Method of Exercising the Attention of Young People. Interspersed with Various Pieces, Calculated for Instruction and Amusement, first appeared in English in 1790. Just before the end of her life, Marie Elizabeth returned to translating the work of La Roche again and Johann Kaspar Lavater. Marie Elizabeth de LaFite died in London in 1794.

== Literary work ==
Marie Elizabeth organized her book, Questions to be Resolved, in a unique fashion. Instead of writing a novel, she describes scenes between two daughters and their mother in which the daughters display a deep commitment to their mother. In these short stories, the mother also plays the role of educator, a common theme throughout European women’s history, as she discusses the meaning of virtue, pleasure, history, and other philosophical questions. This makes her book relate to her intended audience, mothers with daughters, and allows for a style that resembles a textbook rather than a narrative. Marie Elizabeth poses a series of questions following each dialogue or short play in order to reinforce what she is trying to teach readers in the chapters. The 'Divisions' focus directly on the information from the dialogues, and are designed to illuminate readers with answers to their questions.

Her book is designed to be a teaching tool for young girls, taking noble French ideas about morality and turning them into a reading comprehension workbook. Marie Elizabeth not only produced a book of dialogues for learning but is also a reflection of the values and society in which she lived.

Marie Elizabeth created a story of a stranger who gave money to a wounded American soldier from the American Revolution to help him get back home. Although the soldier promised to pay him back, the man was less concerned with the money than with his ability to give charity and with his honesty. The unidentifiable man in the narrative claimed to have donated because he appeared honest and in need, and he had the means to help him. Early modern aristocrats had to be concerned with their public image and giving charity was a common form of publicity that affected their community. This story is written to highlight the importance of helping the less fortunate and to show that good things often happen to selfless people, as seen by the soldier keeping his promise to pay back the man what he borrowed from him. Then again the soldier's father invited the stranger to share in his family's wealth and possessions because of the kindness that had been shown to his son. In addition to writing about the relationship between those with money and the less fortunate, Marie Elizabeth expands on the mother-daughter dynamics of her day.

Mothers were responsible for teaching their daughters the way of the world. However, there are always disagreements between parents and their children. Marie showed these disputes in her book through her creative fictional dialogues. For example, it was expected of daughters to take the advice of their mothers because they had already gone through the trials of womanhood in the early modern period. Like modern families, this is not always practiced in society and Marie Elizabeth argues that struggles make people stronger, but only if they are willing to accept their problems by remaining composed, patient, and confident. These were all traits that young women were expected to display in their daily lives and Marie wrote to continue to pass on this ideology of what makes a proper woman.

“The more at peace one is with one self, the less liable is the mind to be tormented with the turbulent passions of anger, hatred, and revenge. You see, therefore, Paulina, that self-approbation lessens the number of our evils, and softens those it cannot prevent.”

LaFite is known for her letters and books, as well as her translating work. She translated Histoire de la conversion du comte J.F. Sruensée, ci-devant minister de S.M., Memoires de Mlle de Sternheim par Mme de La Roche, and Vie et lettres de Gellert, all from German to French. LaFite also translated a few English texts into French such as Pensées sur les moeurs des Grands. She wrote "Lettres sur divers sujets", letters to Rijklof Michaël von Goens, Entretiens, drames et contes moraux, destines à l’éducation de la jeunesse, par Madame de La Fite, and the original French version of Questions to be Resolved.

== Today ==
Researching Marie Elizabeth de LaFite is difficult due to lack of primary sources. The discrepancies in information include two documents that claim she was born in 1750, 13 years after two other sources. There is a lack of English translations of her works and letters. The majority of her work is kept in The Hague or Amsterdam, while other works and translations are in libraries of Rotterdam and Stockholm.

== Bibliography ==
- 45 Books by and About Women, (Los Angeles, CA: Michael Thompson Books), accessed May 1, 2016.
- Gilleir, Anke, Alicia Montoya, and Suzanna van Dijk. Women Writing Back/Writing Women Back: Transnational Perspectives from the Late Middle Ages to the Dawn of the Modern Era. Leiden: Brill, 2010.
- Hale, Sarah Josepha Buell. Woman's Record, Or, Sketches of All Distinguished Women: From the Creation to A.D. 1854: Arranged in Four Eras: with Selections from Female Writers of Every Age. New York: Harper & Bros., 1855.
- LaFite, Marie Elizabeth. Questions to be Resolved: or, A New Method of Exercising the Attention of Young People. Interspersed with Various Pieces, Calculated for Instruction and Amusement. London: J. Murray, 1791.
