= Petek (surname) =

Petek is a surname. It means "Friday" in Slovene and Serbo-Croatian (Kajkavian). Notable people with this surname include:

- Božo Petek, Slovenian author
- Damjan Petek (born 1973), Slovenian judoka
- Franci Petek (born 1971), Slovenian ski jumper and geographer
- Hrvoje Petek (born 1958), Croatian-born American physicist

== See also ==
- Patek (surname)
