= Nußdorf ob der Traisen =

- Municipality
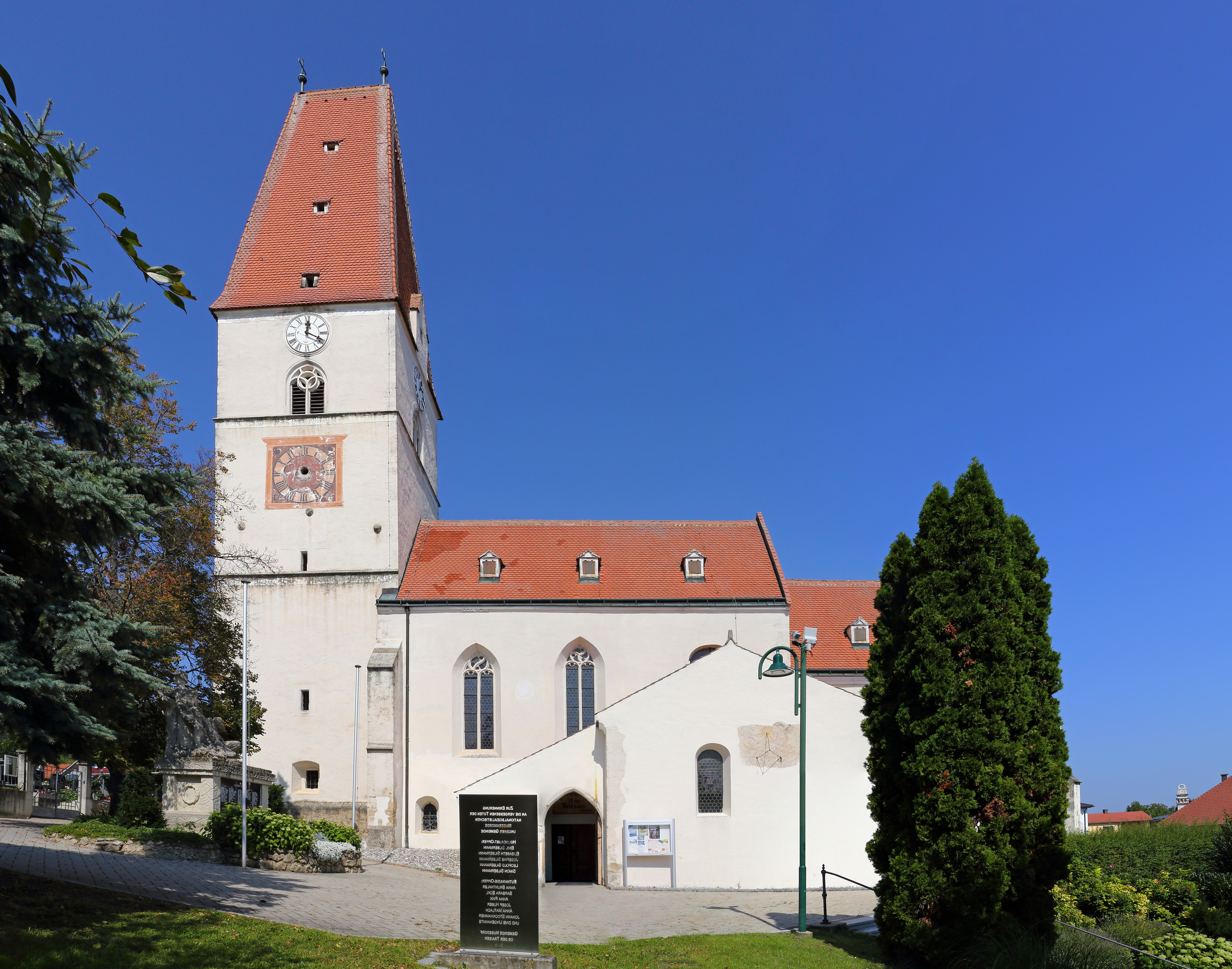
- Nußdorf ob der Traisen parish church

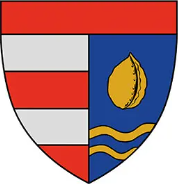
- Coat of arms

- Location within Austria
- Coordinates: 48°21′12″N 15°41′42″E
- Country: Austria
- State: Lower Austria
- District: Sankt Pölten-Land

Government
  - Mayor: Patrick Pipp (ÖVP)

Area
  - Total: 15.5 km^{2} (6.0 sq mi)
- Elevation: 249 m (817 ft)

Population (2018-01-01)
  - Total: 1,758
  - Density: 113/km^{2} (294/sq mi)
- Time zone: UTC+1 (CET)
  - Summer (DST): UTC+2 (CEST)
- Postal code: 3134
- Area code: 02783
- Vehicle registration: PL
- Website: www.nussdorf-traisen.gv.at

Nußdorf ob der Traisen is a municipality in the district of Sankt Pölten-Land in Lower Austria, Austria.

== Population ==
Historical population
Year	Pop.	±%
1971	1,294	—
1981	1,301	+0.5%
1991	1,446	+11.1%
2001	1,563	+8.1%
