= Nepomyšl =

- Market town
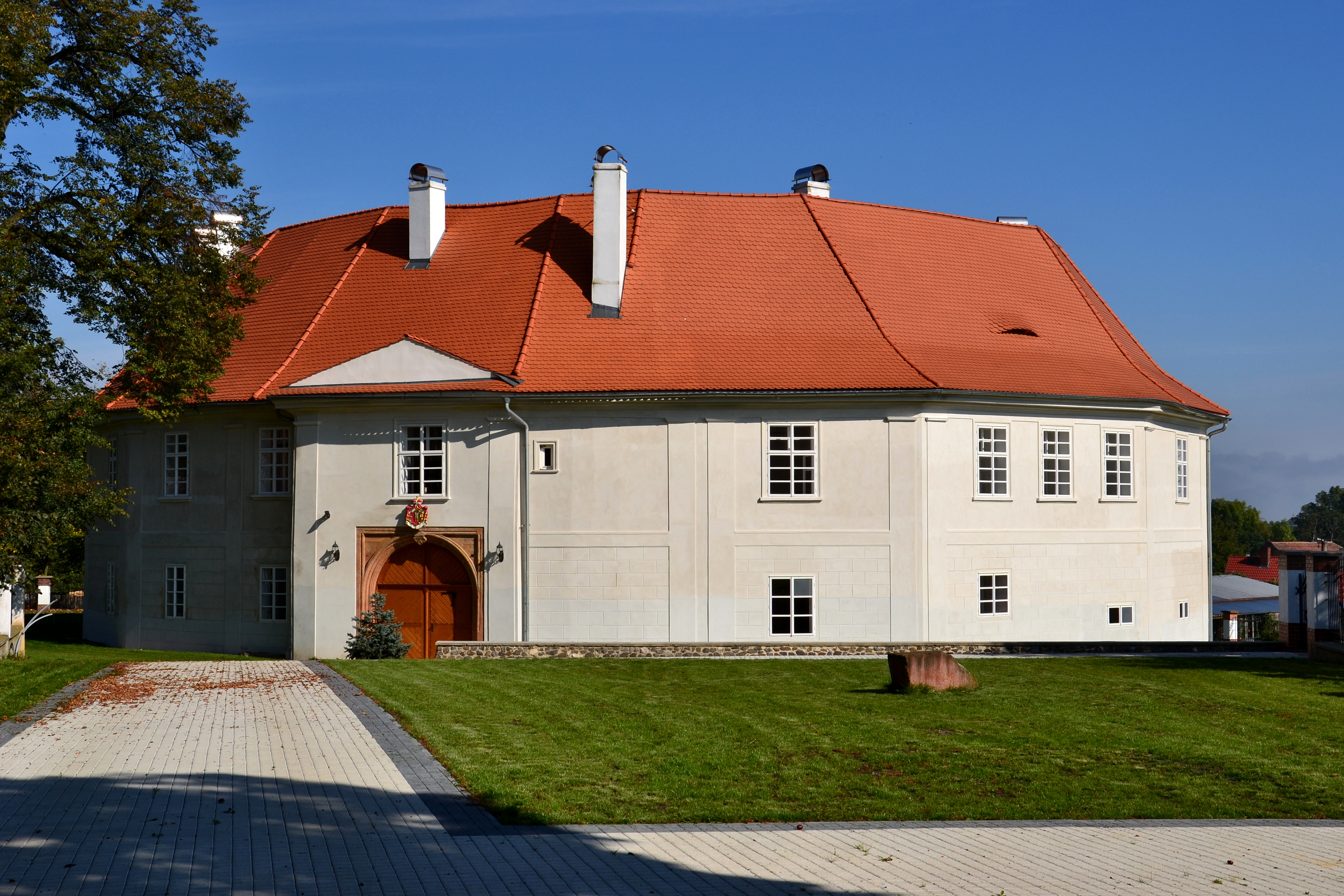
- Nepomyšl Castle

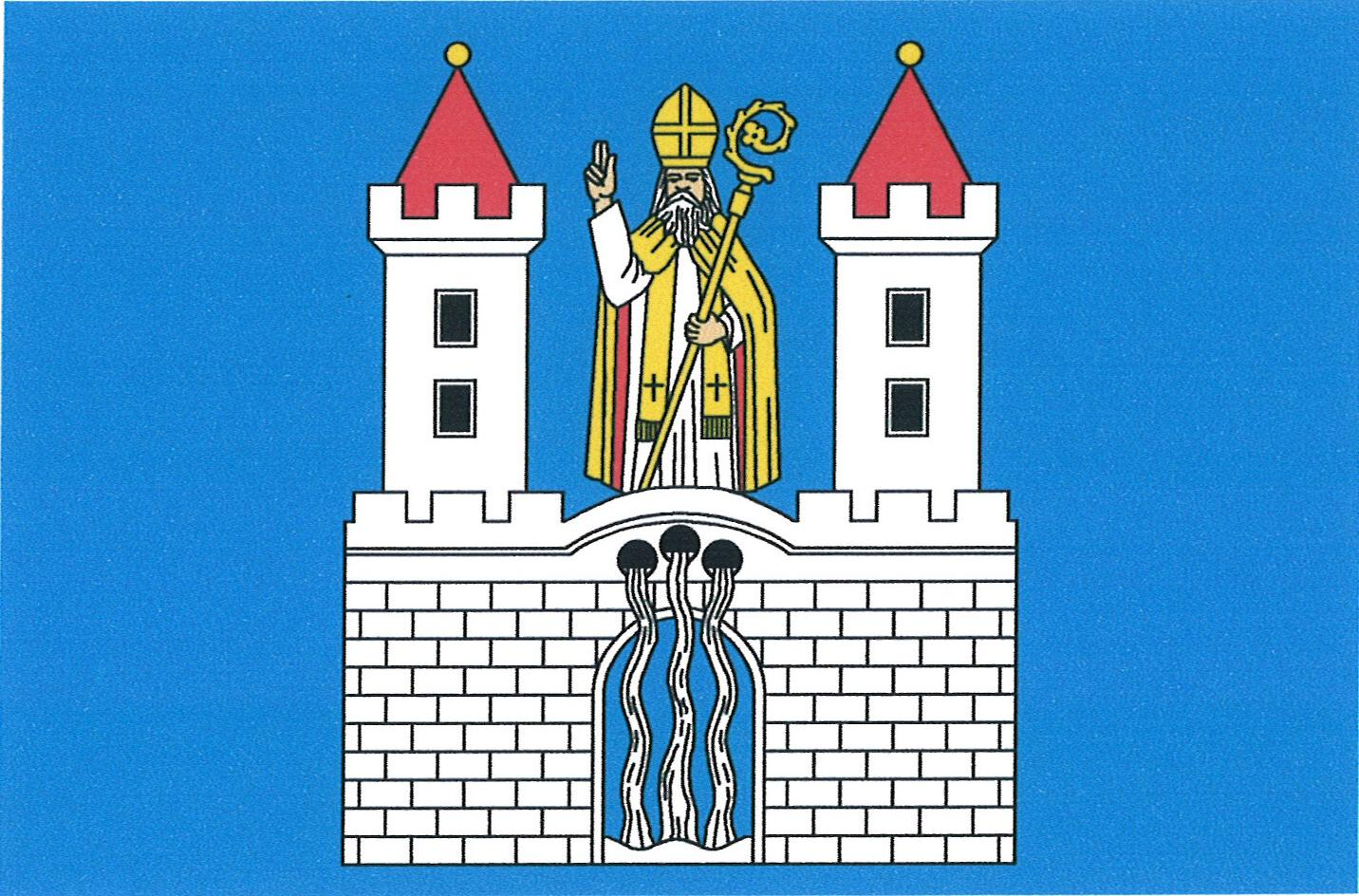
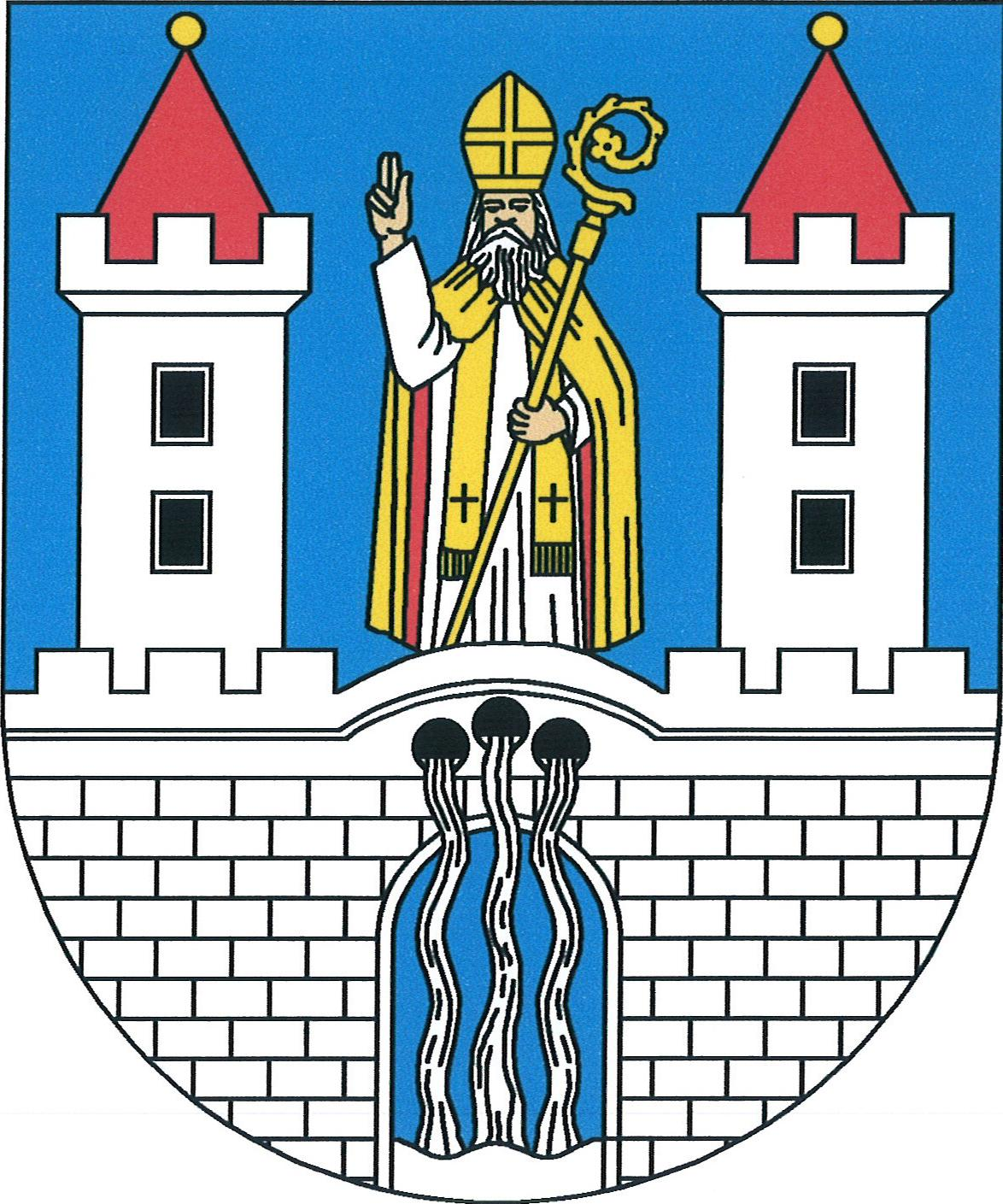
- Flag Coat of arms

- Location in the Czech Republic
- Coordinates: 50°13′5″N 13°18′48″E
- Country: Czech Republic
- Region: Ústí nad Labem
- District: Louny
- First mentioned: 1361

Area
  - Total: 28.23 km^{2} (10.90 sq mi)
- Elevation: 419 m (1,375 ft)

Population (2026-01-01)
  - Total: 430
  - Density: 15/km^{2} (39/sq mi)
- Time zone: UTC+1 (CET)
  - Summer (DST): UTC+2 (CEST)
- Postal codes: 439 71, 441 01
- Website: www.mestysnepomysl.cz

Nepomyšl (Czech pronunciation: [ˈnɛpomɪʃl̩]; German: Pomeisl) is a market town in Louny District in the Ústí nad Labem Region of the Czech Republic. It has about 400 inhabitants.

== Administrative division ==
Nepomyšl consists of five municipal parts (in brackets population according to the 2021 census):

- Nepomyšl (361)
- Chmelištná (15)
- Dětaň (6)
- Dvérce (42)
- Nová Ves (7)

== Etymology ==
The name Nepomyšl is derived from the personal name Nepomysl, meaning "Nepomysl's (court)".

== Geography ==
Nepomyšl is located about 37 kilometres (23 mi) southwest of Louny and 31 km (19 mi) east of Karlovy Vary. It lies in the Doupov Mountains. The highest point is the hill Korunka at 575 metres (1,886 ft) above sea level. The stream Dolánecký potok flows through the market town.

== History ==
The first written mention of Nepomyšl is from 1361. Until 1409, it was owned by the Lords of Janovice. In the following centuries, the owners often changed. It is unknown when Nepomyšl was promoted to a market town, but not later than in 1717.

== Demographics ==
Historical population

Year	Pop.	±%
1869	1,683	—
1880	1,743	+3.6%
1890	1,707	−2.1%
1900	1,767	+3.5%
1910	1,784	+1.0%

Year	Pop.	±%
1921	1,728	−3.1%
1930	1,732	+0.2%
1950	766	−55.8%
1961	706	−7.8%
1970	599	−15.2%

Year	Pop.	±%
1980	500	−16.5%
1991	403	−19.4%
2001	412	+2.2%
2011	385	−6.6%
2021	431	+11.9%

Source: Censuses

== Transport ==
There are no railways or major roads passing through the municipality.

== Sights ==
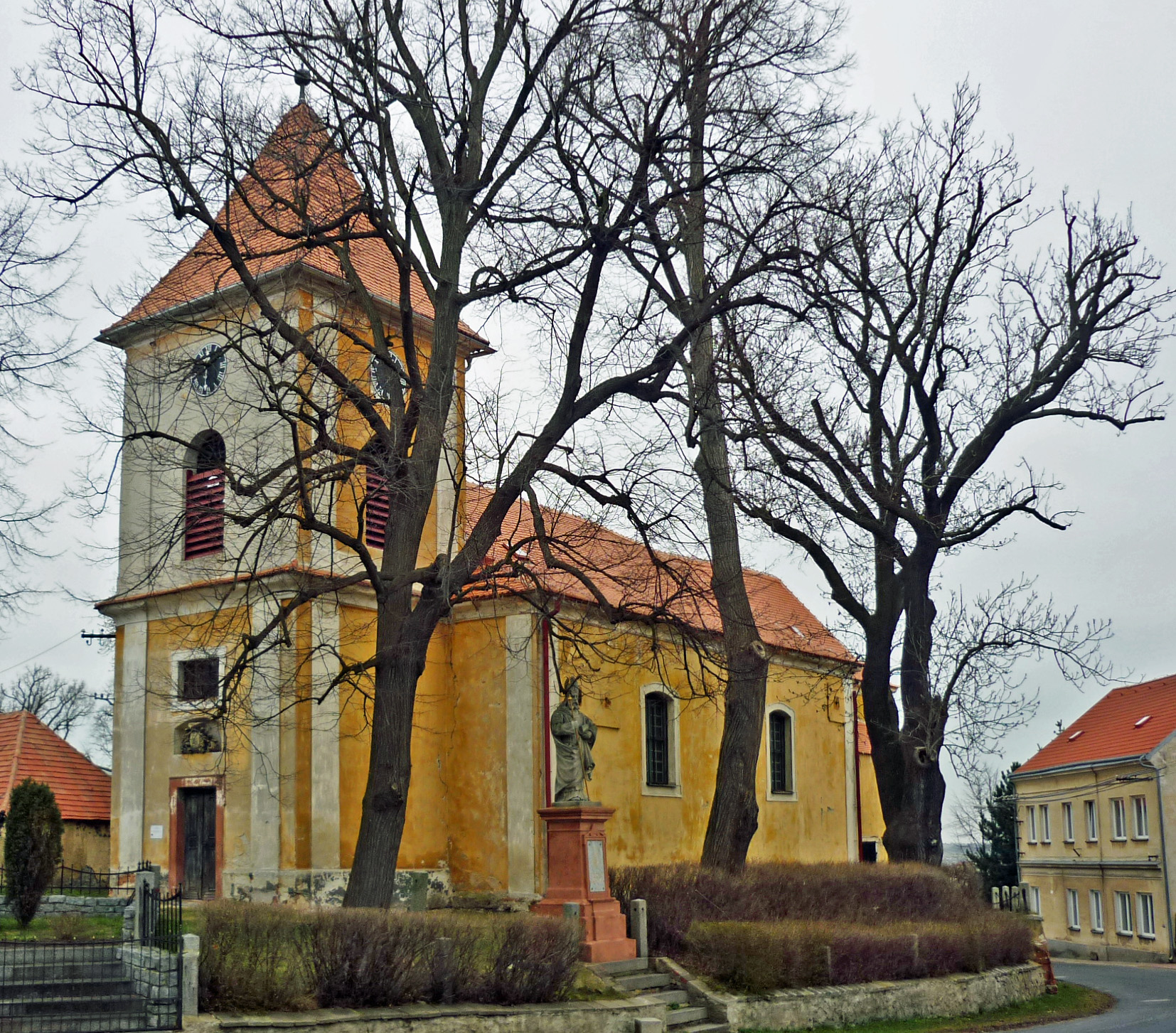
Church of Saint Nicholas

The main landmark of Nepomyšl is the Church of Saint Nicholas. It was originally a Gothic church from the 14th century, rebuilt in the Baroque style in the middle of the 18th century.

A significant monument is the Nepomyšl Castle. It was originally a Gothic fortress, also dating from the 14th century. At the end of the 17th century, it was rebuilt into the Renaissance castle, but the castle retained some relics from the original fortress. The castle has a circular shape and there is a pentagonal courtyard in the middle of the castle.
