= Pátek =

- Municipality
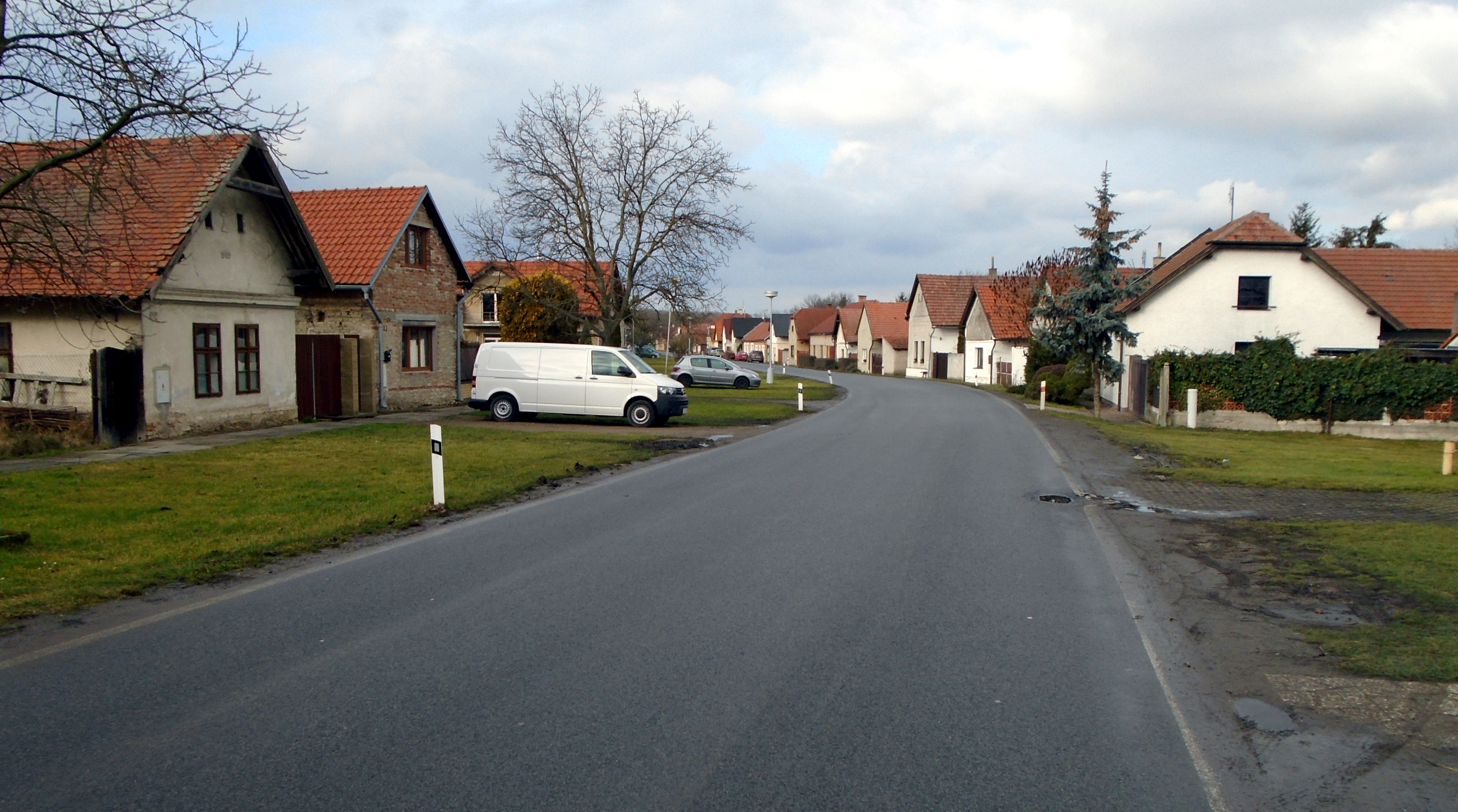
- Main street

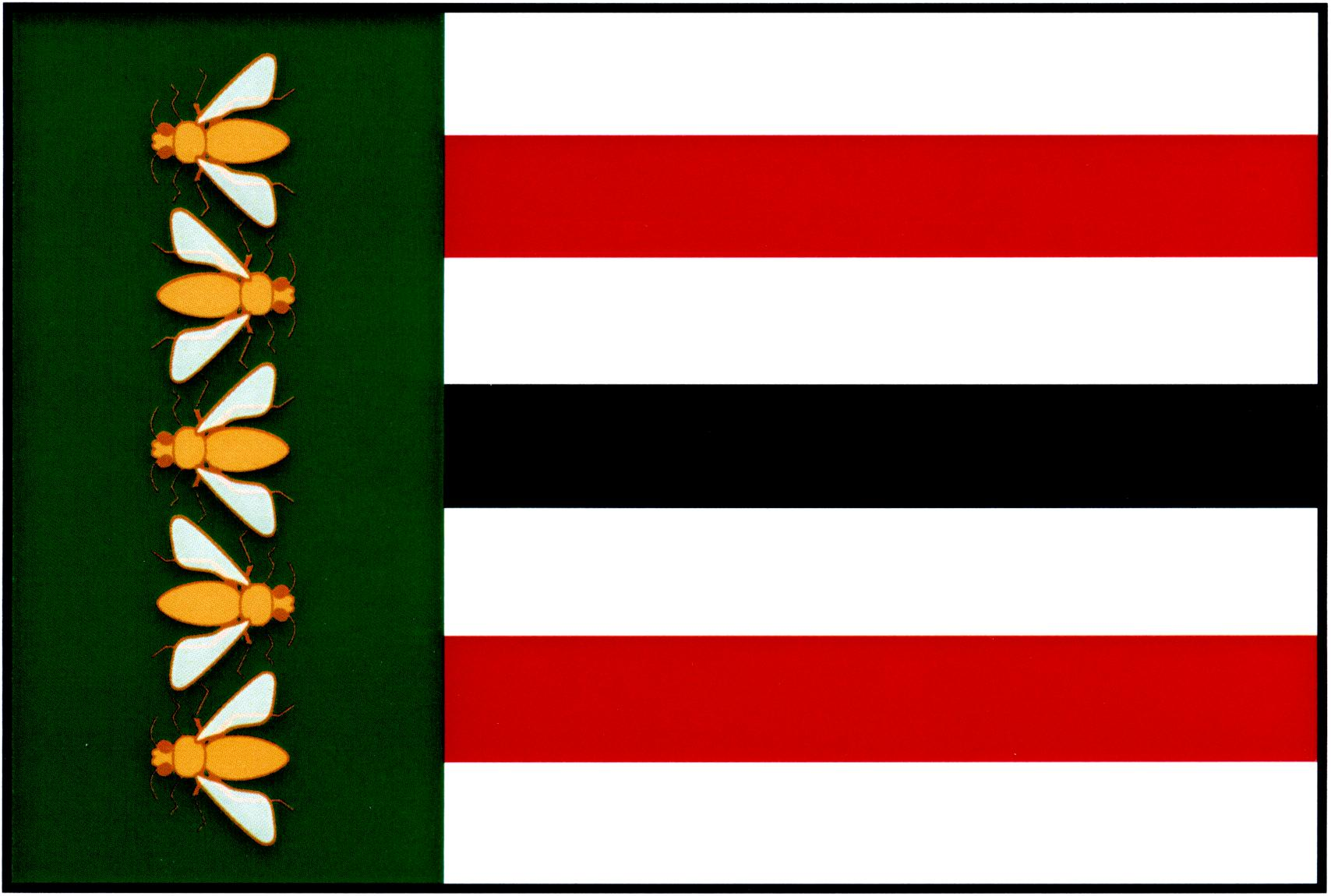
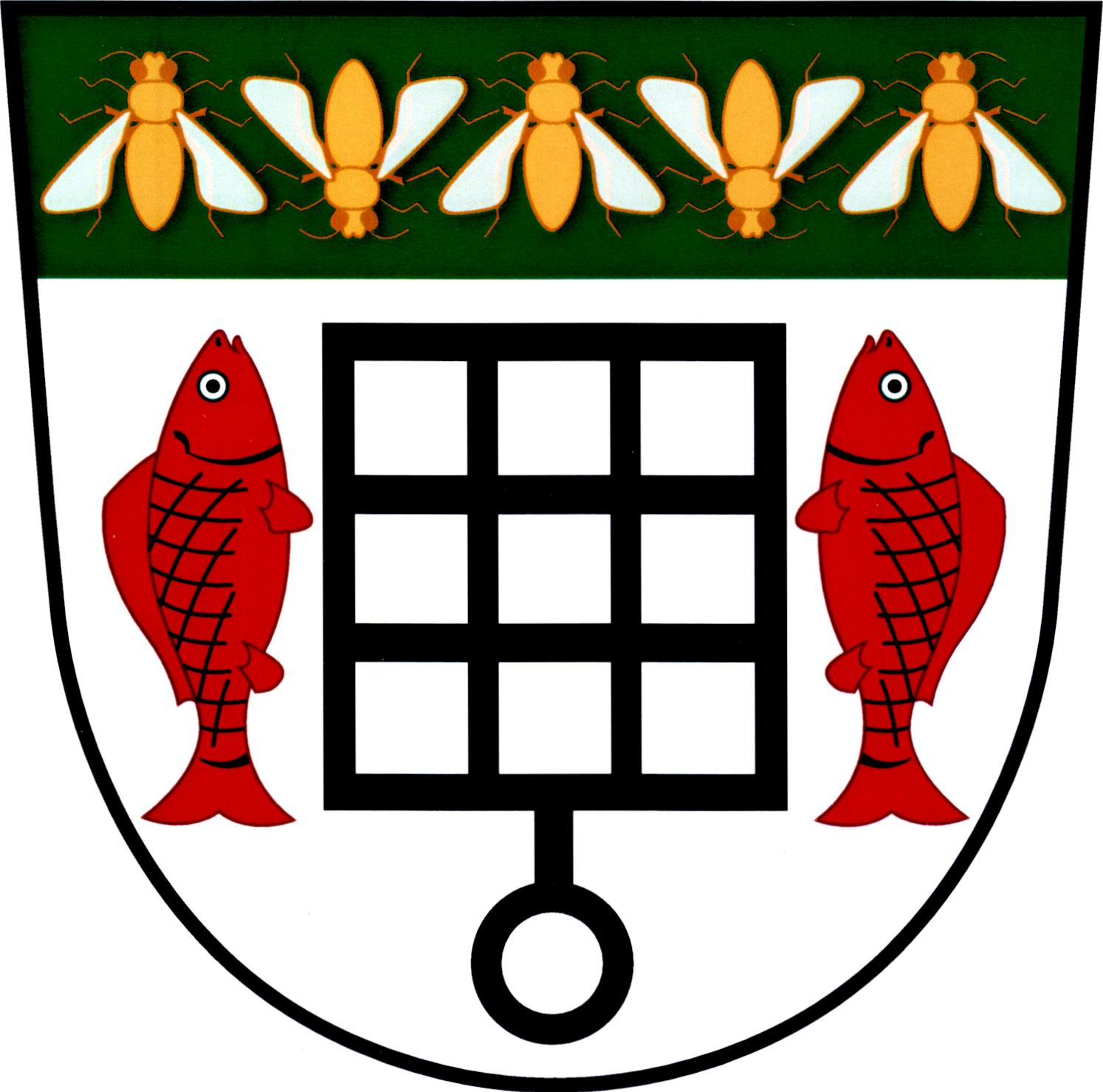
- Flag Coat of arms

- Location in the Czech Republic
- Coordinates: 50°9′56″N 15°9′31″E
- Country: Czech Republic
- Region: Central Bohemian
- District: Nymburk
- First mentioned: 1345

Area
  - Total: 6.92 km^{2} (2.67 sq mi)
- Elevation: 189 m (620 ft)

Population (2026-01-01)
  - Total: 780
  - Density: 110/km^{2} (290/sq mi)
- Time zone: UTC+1 (CET)
  - Summer (DST): UTC+2 (CEST)
- Postal code: 290 01
- Website: www.obecpatek.cz

Pátek is a municipality and village in Nymburk District in the Central Bohemian Region of the Czech Republic. It has about 800 inhabitants.

== Etymology ==
The name literally means 'Friday' in Czech. The village was probably founded on Friday.

== Geography ==
Pátek is located about 8 kilometres (5 mi) east of Nymburk and 44 km (27 mi) east of Prague. It lies in a flat agricultural landscape in the Central Elbe Table. The channel Sánský kanál flows through the municipality. There are several small fishponds in the territory of Pátek.

== History ==
The first written mention of Pátek is from 1345.

== Demographics ==
Historical population

Year	Pop.	±%
1869	406	—
1880	460	+13.3%
1890	494	+7.4%
1900	518	+4.9%
1910	605	+16.8%

Year	Pop.	±%
1921	630	+4.1%
1930	618	−1.9%
1950	573	−7.3%
1961	519	−9.4%
1970	481	−7.3%

Year	Pop.	±%
1980	443	−7.9%
1991	482	+8.8%
2001	507	+5.2%
2011	616	+21.5%
2021	755	+22.6%

Source: Censuses

== Transport ==
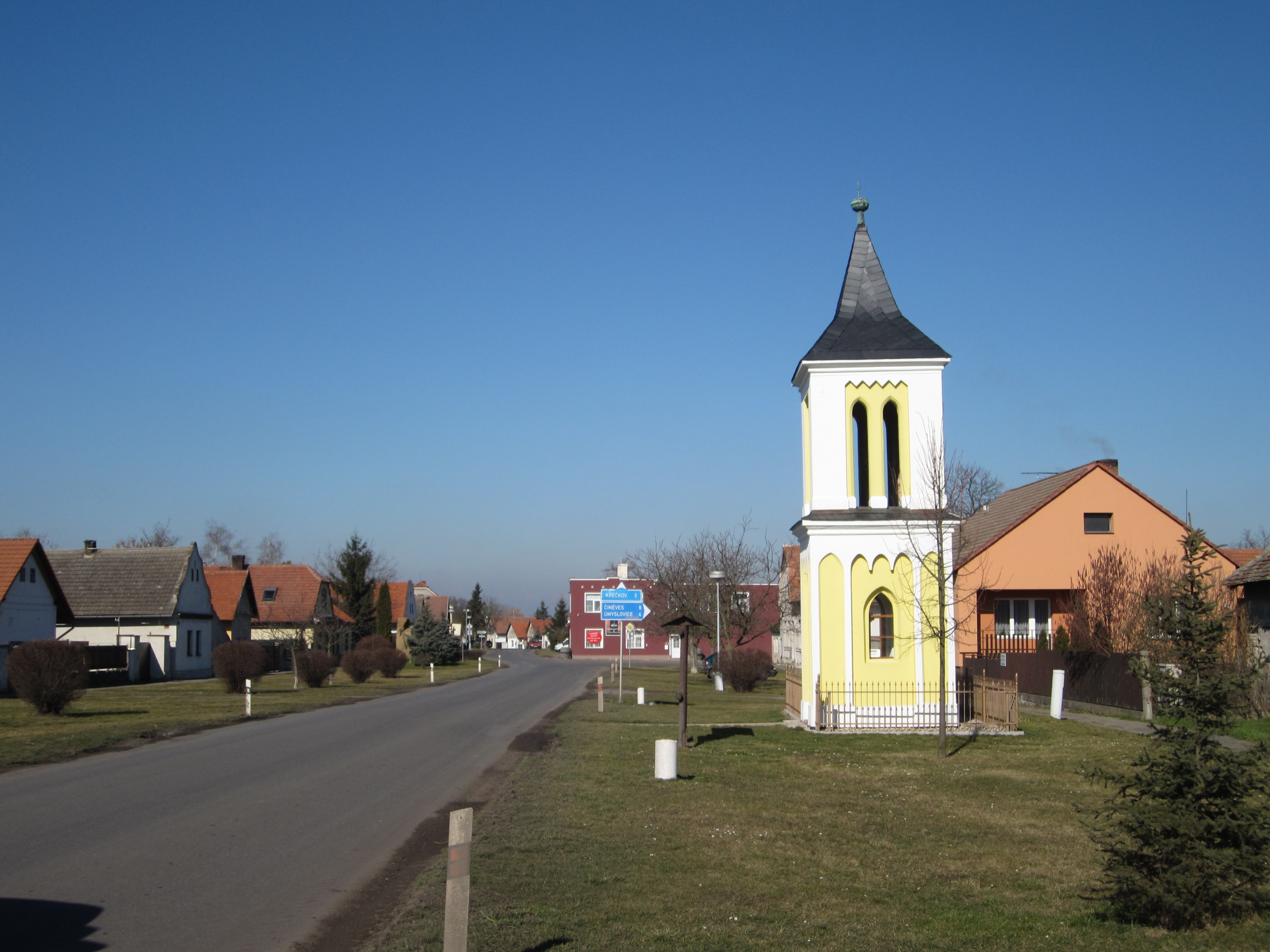
Chapel next to the main road

There are no railways or major roads passing through the municipality.

== Sights ==
The most valuable building is a watermill from 1820. It was functional until 1952. Today the building is unused.

The Church of Saint Lawrence is a cemetery church without historic value. The original wooden church was built in 1350–1354. At the turn of the 15th and 16th centuries, it was replaced by a stone one. Around 1711, the church was probably struck by lightning and fell into disrepair. In 1854, it was completely rebuilt into its present form.
