= Schloss Hollenburg =

Medieval castle near Köttmannsdorf in Carinthia, Austria

Coordinates: 46.547°N 14.262°E

Burg Hollenburg
- Part of Köttmannsdorf
- Carinthia, Austria
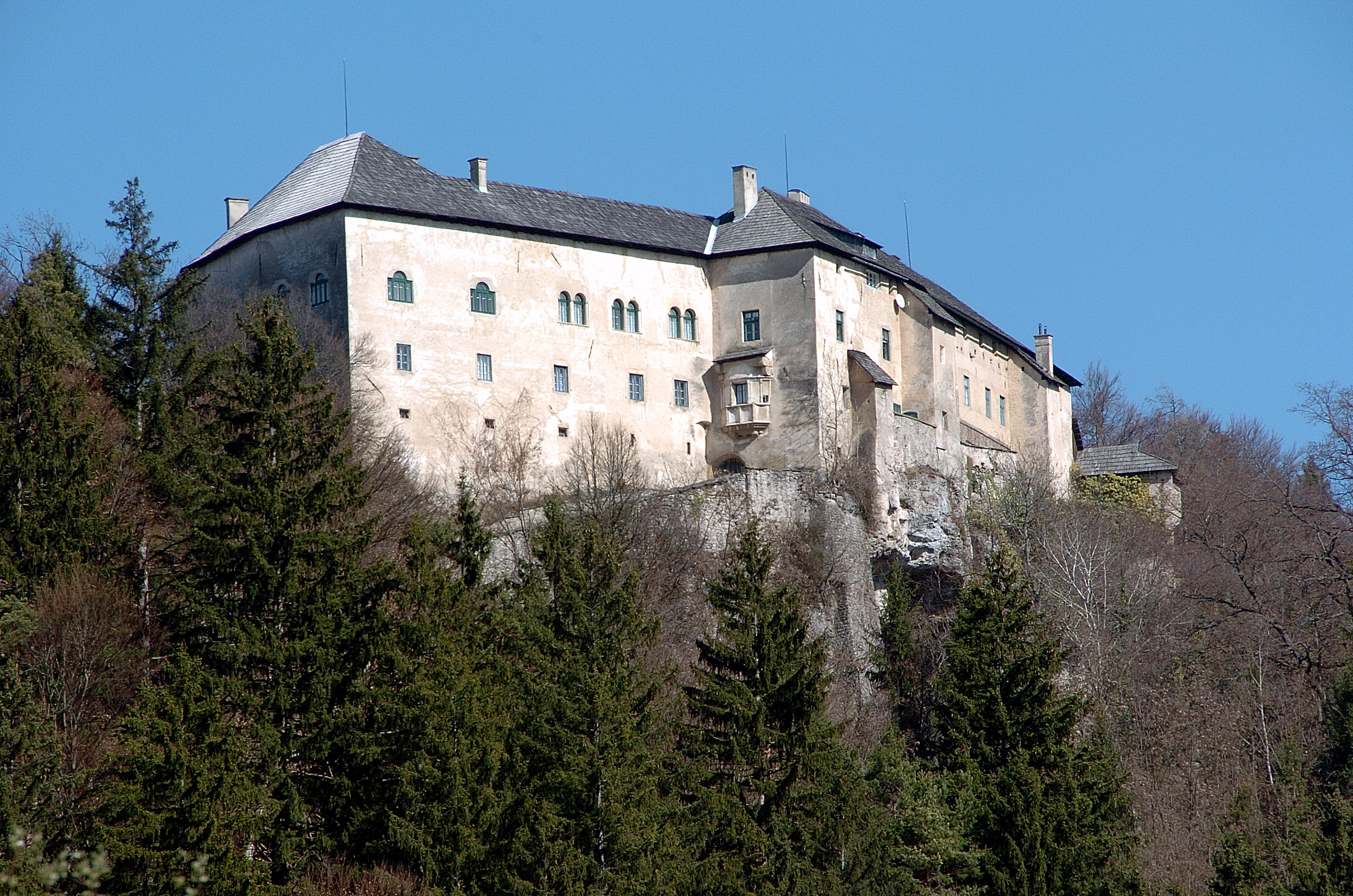

Site information
- Type: Spur castle
- Owner: Private
- Open to the public: Exterior
- Condition: Preserved

Site history
- Built: c.1100s

Burg Hollenburg (Slovene: Humberk) is a medieval castle located near Köttmannsdorf in Carinthia, Austria. Situated on a rock on the northern slope of the Drava valley, Burg Hollenburg sits at an elevation of 561 metres (1,841 ft) above sea level.

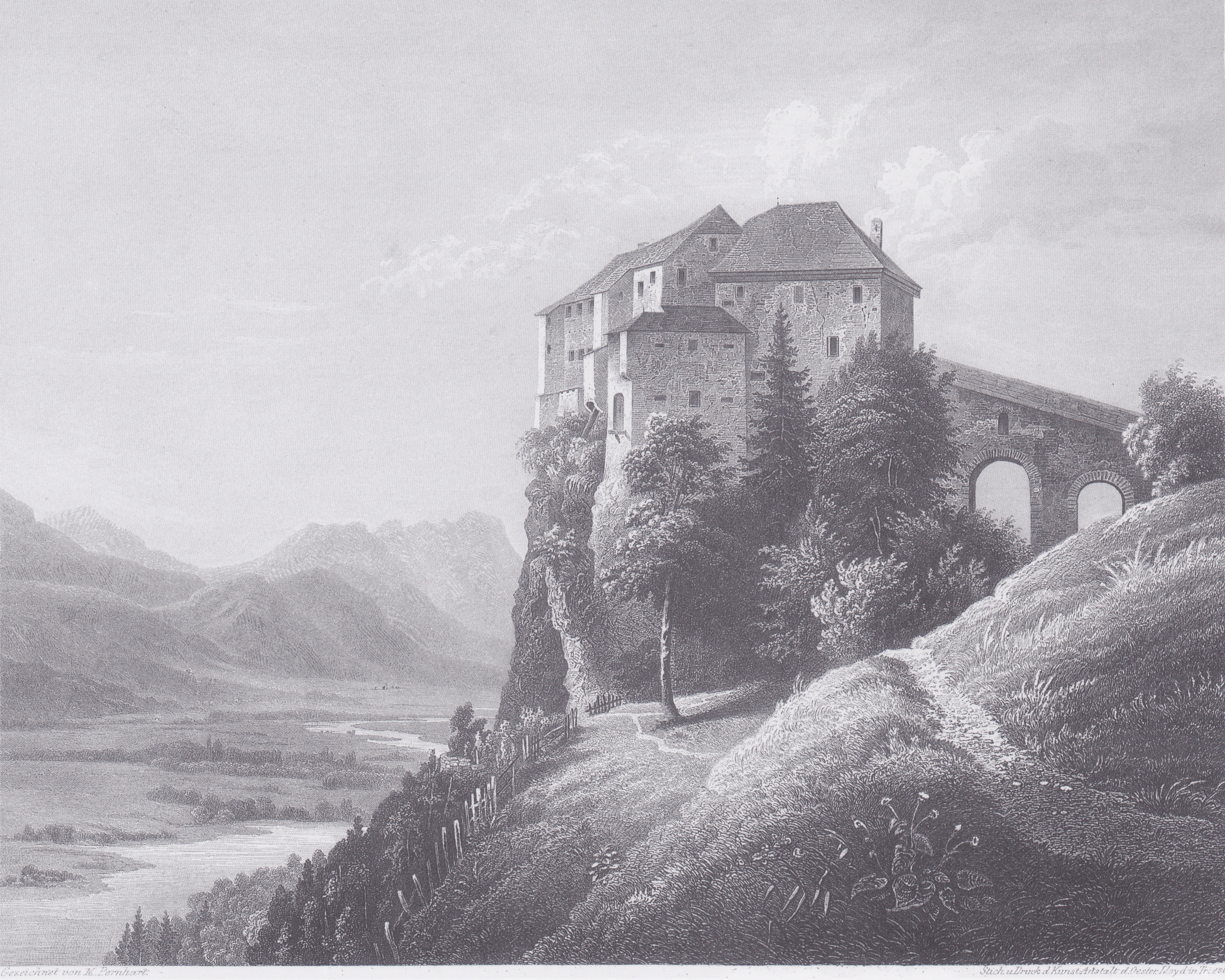
Engraving by Markus Pernhart (1824–1871)

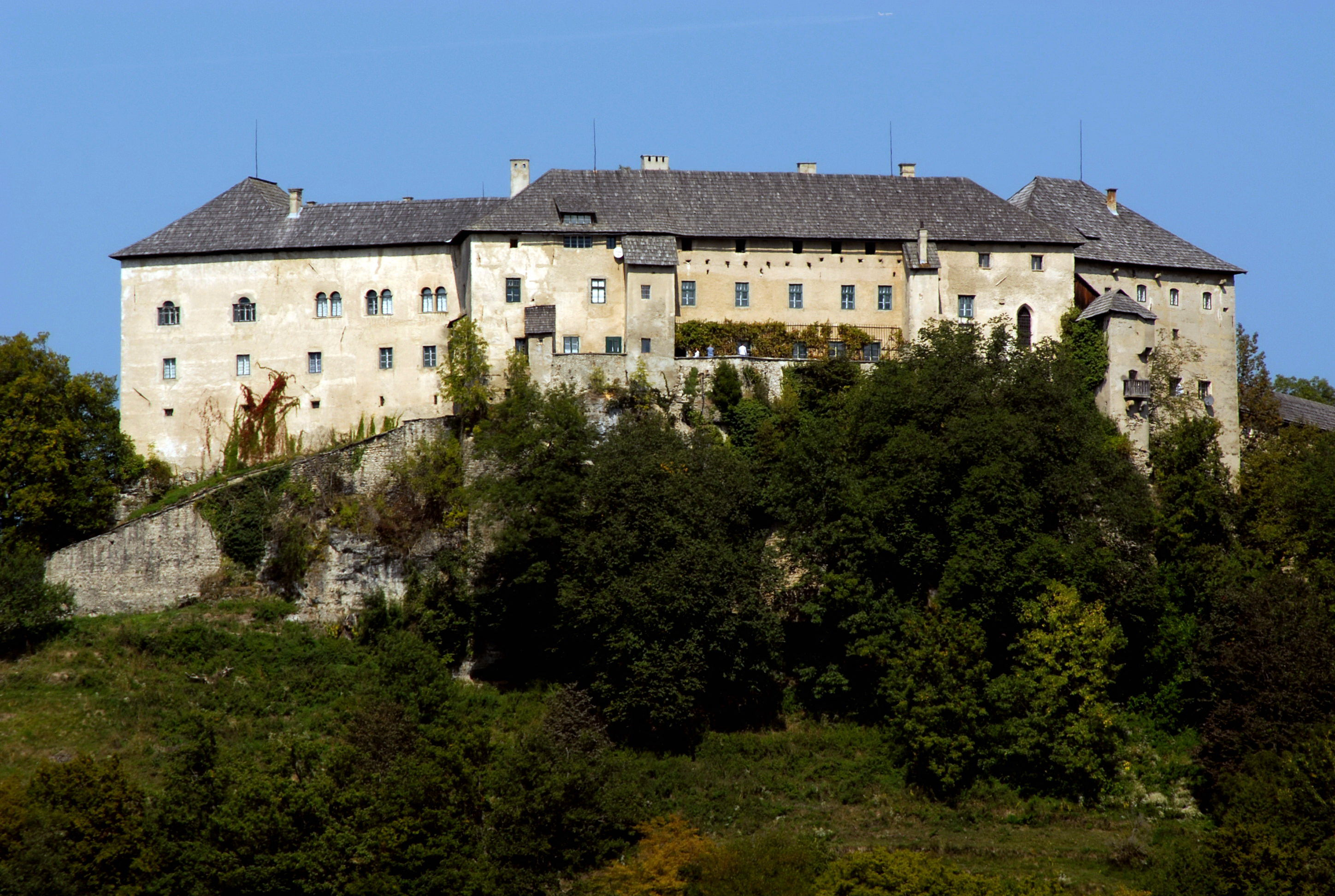
Alternative view of Holleburg

One Swiker, Lord of Hollenburg in the Duchy of Carinthia, was initially recorded as a witness in the 1142 deed of the foundation of Viktring Abbey. is believed to have been a vassal of the ducal House of Sponheim. His son, Reginher, is noted as the Lord of Steuerberg. Reginher accompanied King Conrad III of Germany on the Second Crusade in 1147 and subsequently served as a ministerialis of Margrave Ottokar IV of Styria.

The castle held significant strategic importance because of its location at a Drava river crossing and along the road to the Loibl Pass and the March of Carniola. Following the extinction of the Hollenburg dynasty in 1246, ownership transferred to the Styrian Lords of Pettau. In 1438, it was inherited by the House of Stubenberg. The structure suffered severe damage during the 1348 Friuli earthquake.

In 1514 the Habsburg emperor Maximilian I, stuck in the War of the League of Cambrai against Venice and highly indebted, sold Hollenburg to his son-in-law Lord Siegmund of Dietrichstein (1484–1533), elevating him to the rank of a Baron.

He was married to Barbara von Rottal (1500–1550), an illegitimate daughter of Emperor Maximilian with Margareta von Edelsheim (d. 1522). The House of Dietrichstein had the castle rebuilt in a Renaissance style, finished in 1588. The Dietrichsteins held the castle until the extinction of the Hollenburg branch in 1861. In 1913 it was acquired by the Wittgenstein family.

== See also ==
- List of castles in Austria
