= Burg Thalberg =

Medieval castle in Styria, Austria

Coordinates: 47°24′57″N 16°00′19″E

- Styria, Austria
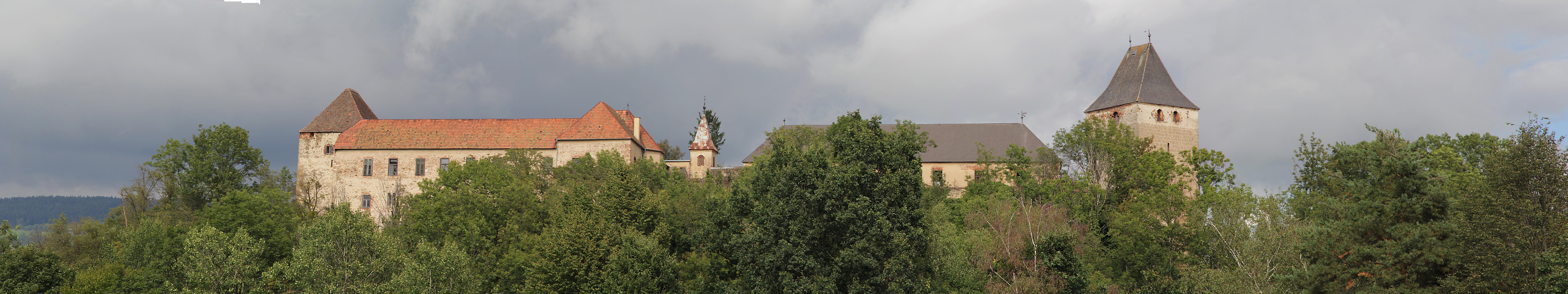

Site information
- Type: Hilltop castle

Site history
- Built: 1171 to 1180

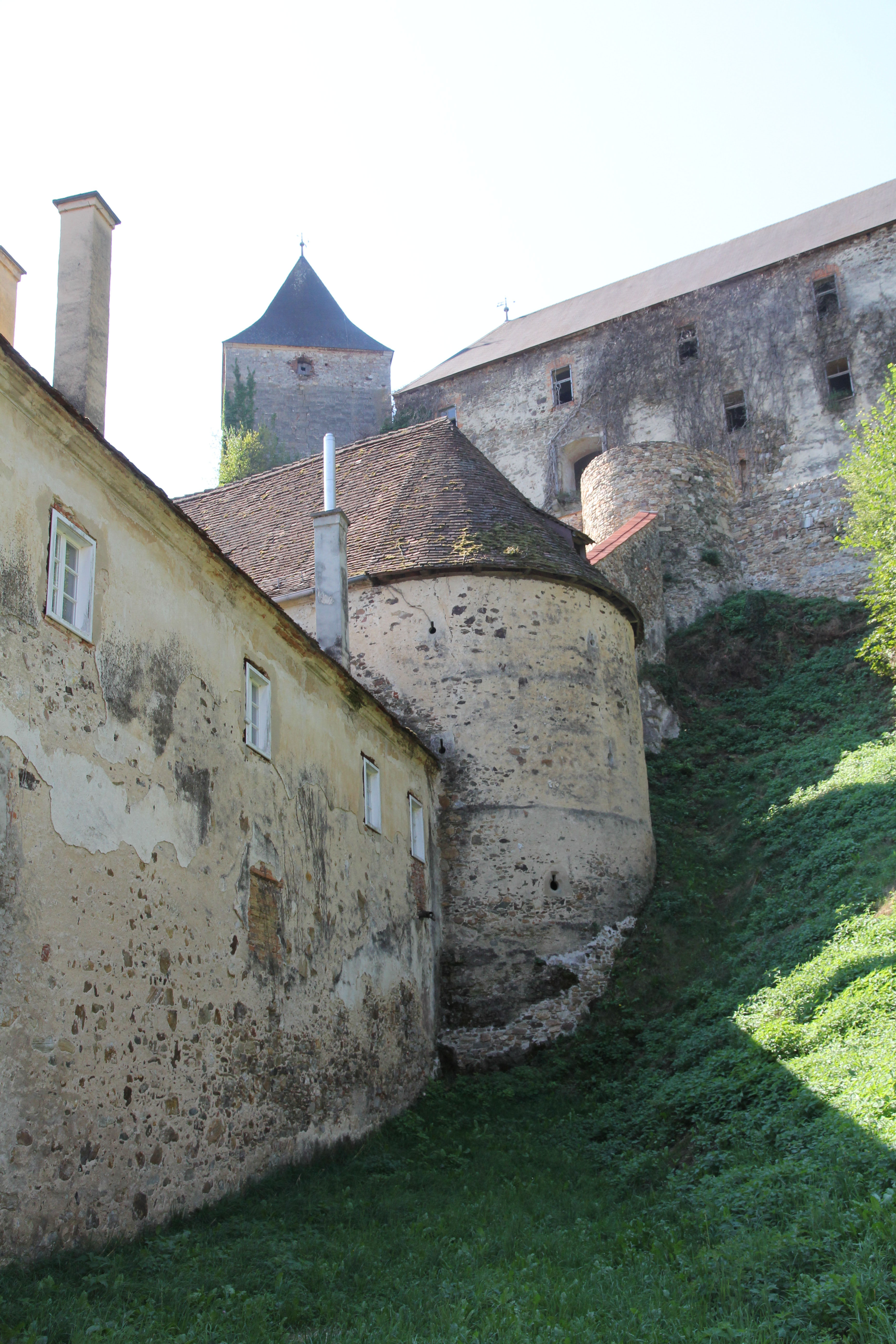
Thalberg Castle

Burg Thalberg is a high medieval castle in Styria, Austria. Burg Thalberg is 504 metres (1,654 ft) above sea level. It is probably the best preserved Romanesque fortification in the country.

== Architecture ==
The building complex of the upper castle (Oberburg) is 90 meters long and 23 meters wide. Most of the existing structure from the Romanesque period has been preserved. Two massive square towers stand at the narrow ends of the castle. The 24-meter-high keep (Bergfried) in the east protects the gatehouse, which is constructed from ashlar blocks and rubble stone. It is connected to the lower western tower by a twelve-meter-high curtain wall.

Adjoining the keep is the 50-meter-long outer bailey (outer courtyard). Its northern side is flanked by a three-story residential building dating back to the Romanesque period, though it was expanded during the late Gothic era. While the exterior remains intact, most of the interior ceilings have collapsed, making it effectively a roofed ruin.

To the west, the likewise three-story palas (residential wing) encloses the inner courtyard. Its northern tract was rebuilt in the late Gothic period, while the southern wing was redesigned in the 17th century. Located on the upper floor of the transverse wing that separates the inner and outer courtyards is the two-bay, late Gothic Chapel of St. Nicholas (St. Niklas-Kapelle). This chapel underwent a Gothic Revival renovation around 1910. Its choir termination projects into the outer courtyard like an oriel. Adjoining the chapel is a small hall featuring a central column and a Baroque stucco ribbed vault.

The living quarters on the first floor of the palas were also restored in the early 20th century, following a long period of roofless decay. During this process, the old coffered ceilings were lost, and the courtyard galleries were replaced with unadorned exterior corridors. Several Romanesque details have survived on the walls of the various buildings, such as the round-arched entrance to the keep. Located 4.5 meters above the ground, this entrance features two inset colonnettes, of which only the bud capitals and bases have survived. Furthermore, remnants of an ornamental frieze on the eastern gate complex and two bricked-up bifora (double-arched) windows are visible.

In the 15th century, the entire castle complex was surrounded by a low wall, creating a narrow zwinger (outer ward). The former battlements are no longer extant. At the foot of the hill lies the outer castle (Vorburg), built in 1499. It features its own gatehouse with a former drawbridge portal and is connected to the main castle by a curtain wall. A three-story granary dating from the 17th century occupies the southwest corner of the spacious courtyard.

== History of Ownership ==
The castle is believed to have been built by Leopold von Erlach between 1171 and 1180 as a sovereign fief during border fortification measures against Hungary. Thalberg is first mentioned in documents in 1209 in connection with Leopold's sons, Erhard and Heinrich von Krumbach. In 1346, it passed to Ulrich der Tursen. In the 15th century, the Neuberg family and the Lords of Rottal were the owners of the castle; the latter commissioned significant alterations and expansions.

From 1523 to 1557, Thalberg belonged to the Dietrichstein family. They expanded the estate at the expense of the Vorau and Pöllau monastery properties. The regional court jurisdiction belonging to the castle extended to the Lower Austrian border at the Wechsel range. At that time, Thalberg was the center of Protestantism in northern East Styria. Around 1530, Turkish raiding parties devastated the complex.

Via Jakob von der Dürr and Adam von Lindeck, the castle passed to the Rauber family in 1565. For financial reasons, the estate was seized and sold to Wolfgang Unverzagt in 1603. The Raubers attempted to retake Thalberg by force, but their attack was repelled. In 1610, the Jesuits of Graz acquired the property. During the Great Turkish War of 1683 and the Kuruc incursions of 1704 and 1708, the castle served as a refuge for the population of neighboring Friedberg.

When the Jesuit Order was suppressed in 1773, Thalberg reverted to the state and was leased out. In 1797, the estate was auctioned publicly. The new owners, the Nobles von Erko, expanded the Meierhof (manor farm) at the foot of the castle hill into a palace-like residence. As only this building was inhabited from then on, the upper castle (Hochschloss) began to fall into disrepair. This deterioration accelerated during the 19th century, as owners changed frequently and showed no interest in the old structure. Occasionally, the castle was even used as a quarry. During this time, the castle lost a significant portion of its Romanesque stonework.

It was not until the early 20th century that the complex was restored by Anna Potzinger, the owner at the time; it subsequently served as a castle pension and convalescent home. In 1917, Helene Natel purchased the castle at auction, but sold it just one year later to the Hauke-Gißlinger family. Today, the castle remains in the possession of the Gisslinger family.

== See also ==
- List of castles in Austria
