= Franz von Dietrichstein =

Politician and Catholic clergyman

His Eminence Franz von Dietrichstein
- Prince of Dietrichstein; Bishop of Olomouc
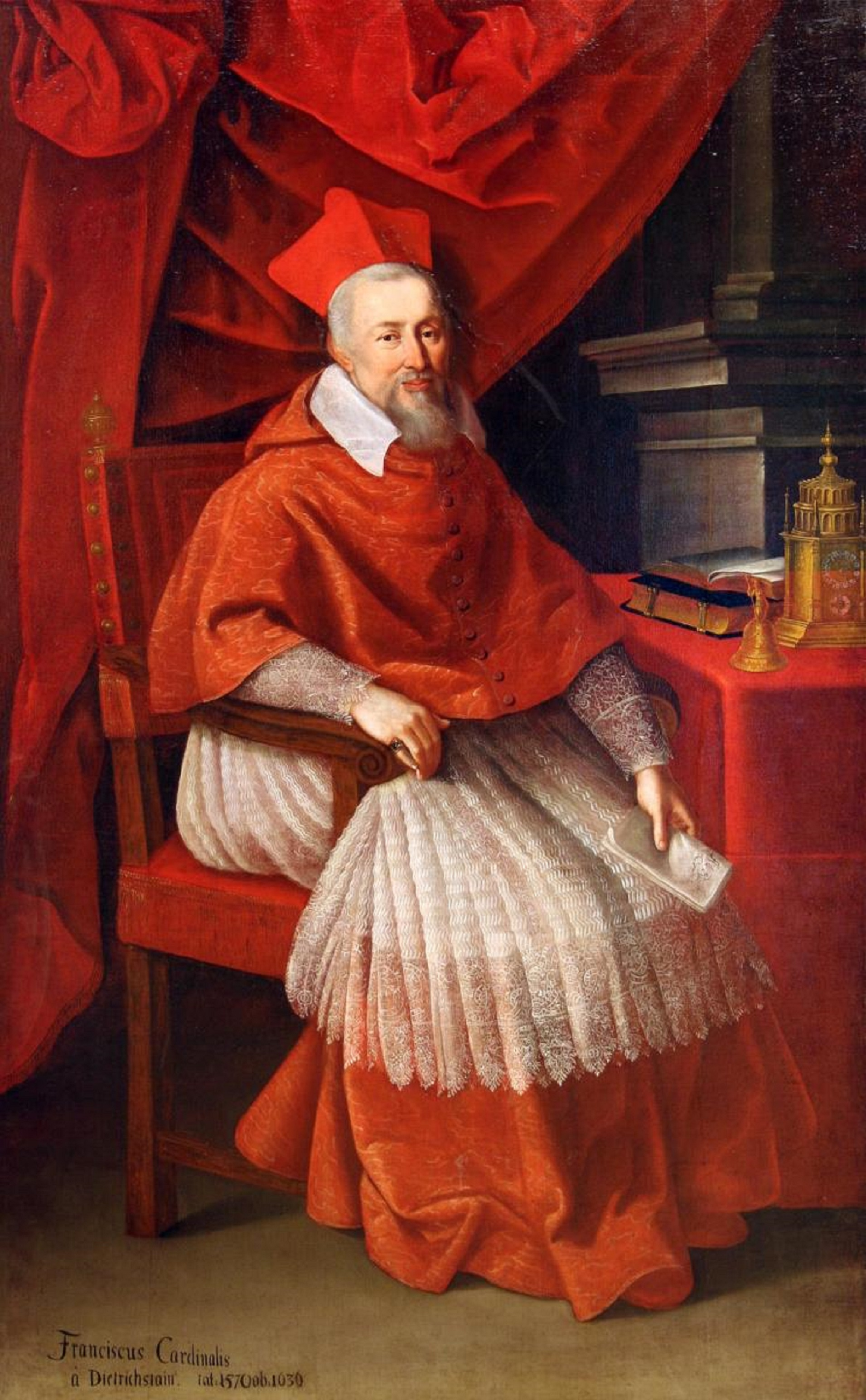
- Portrait of Cardinal Dietrichstein, 17th century
- Church: Catholic Church
- Diocese: Olomouc
- Appointed: 1 September 1599
- Term ended: 19 September 1636
- Predecessor: Stanislav Pavlovský
- Successor: Jan Arnošt von Plattenstein
- Other posts: Cardinal-Priest of Santa Maria in Trastevere (1623-1636)
- Previous posts: Cardinal-Priest of San Silvestro in Capite (1599–1623)

Orders
- Ordination: 1597 by Pope Clement VIII
- Consecration: 8 September 1599 by Pope Clement VIII
- Created cardinal: 3 March 1599 by Pope Clement VIII
- Rank: Cardinal-Priest

Personal details
- Born: Franz Seraph von Dietrichstein; 22 August 1570 Madrid, Spain
- Died: 19 September 1639 (aged 69) Brno, Bohemia
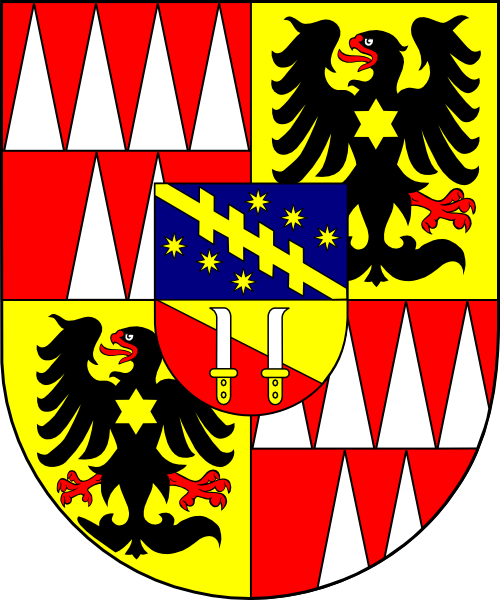
- Coat of arms

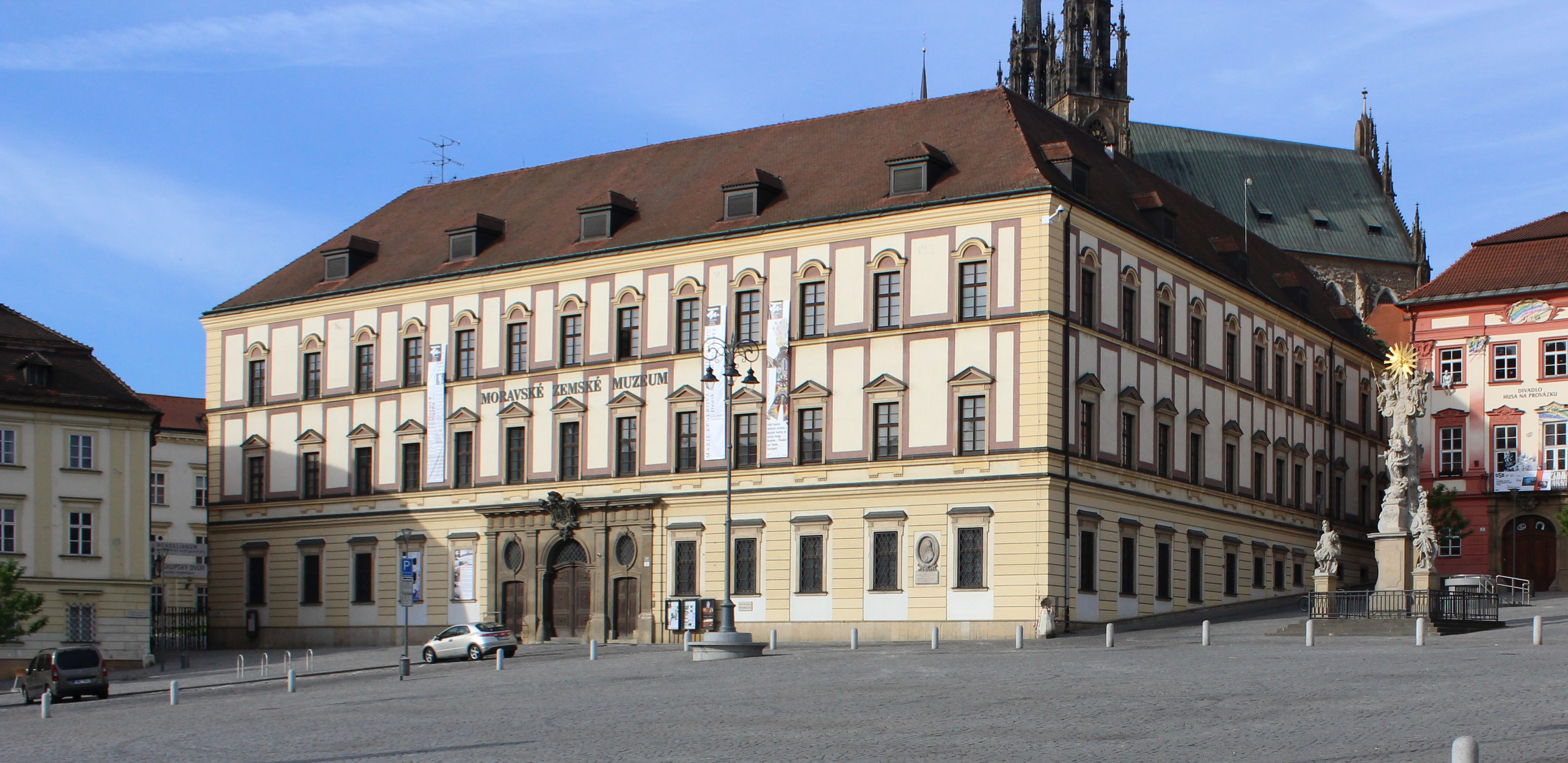
The Dietrichstein Palace (current Moravian Museum), residence of Franz von Dietrichstein in Brno.

Franz Seraph von Dietrichstein (Czech: František Serafín z Ditrichštejna, 22 August 1570 – 19 September 1636), was an Austrian nobleman and cardinal, member of an ancient House of Dietrichstein, was the 1st Prince of Dietrichstein, Archbishop of Olomouc, Governor (Landeshauptmann) of Moravia.

== Early life ==
Dietrichstein was born on 22 August 1570 in Madrid, the ninth of 13 children born to Baron Adam von Dietrichstein (1527-1590), the Holy Roman Empire's ambassador to Spain and his wife, Margarita Folch de Cardona, member of the powerful aragonese House of Folch, one of the most influential families originated in the Kingdom of Aragon. On his father's side, his great-grandfather was Maximilian I, Holy Roman Emperor, through his natural daughter, Baroness Barbara von Rottal (1500-1550), who married Adam's father, Siegmund Freiherr von Dietrichstein (1484–1533).

He studied in Vienna and Prague. Then in 1588, at age 18, he moved to Rome to study at the Collegium Germanicum. While in Rome he befriended Cardinal Ippolito Aldobrandini who was elected pope in 1592 and took the name Pope Clement VIII. Dietrichstein became the new pope's chamberlain and worked to represent the interests of his native Bohemia as canon of the cathedral chapters of Olomouc, Wroclav, Passau and Leitmeritz.

== Cardinalate ==
Dietrichstein was ordained in 1597 and then elevated to cardinal only two years later, in 1599, with an appointment as cardinal-priest of San Silvestro in Capite. In May of that same year he was elected as Archbishop of Olomouc, though his election was opposed by members of the local cathedral chapter. He was consecrated by the pope himself, with special dispensation for having not reached canonical age (he was only 29 at the time).

According to historian Ludwig von Pastor, Dietrichstein became the, "soul of all Catholic undertakings in Moravia". It was apparently due to Dietrichstein's zeal that protestant reformer Karl von Zierotin was forced into early retirement.

He was unable to participate in the papal conclave of March 1605 but he did take part in the conclave of May 1605 which elected Pope Paul V. In 1607 he returned again to Bohemia as President of Emperor Rudolf II's privy council.

== Thirty Years' War ==
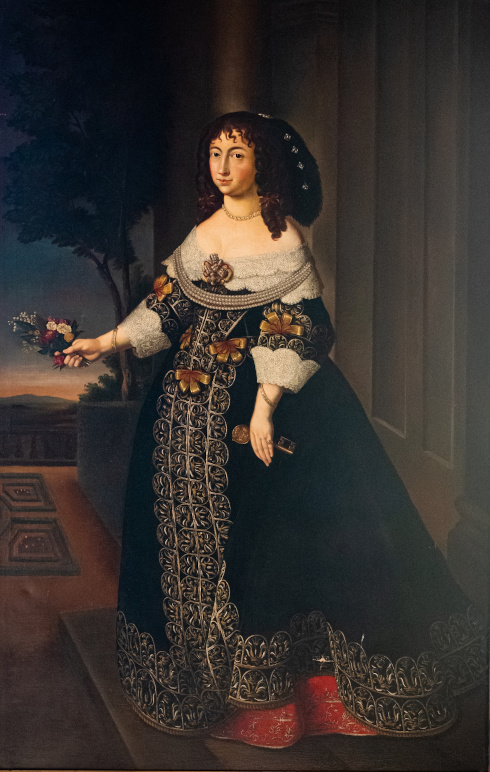
Countess Johanna Franziska von Magnis, natural daughter of Franz

At the outbreak of the Bohemian Revolt and the Thirty Years' War, in 1618, Dietrichstein fled to Vienna but returned after Emperor Ferdinand II's decisive victory at the Battle of White Mountain and was appointed Governor of Moravia from 1621 to 1628. Due to the ongoing conflict he did not participate in either the 1621 or 1623 papal conclaves.

He became responsible for implementing the Counter-Reformation in Bohemia and surrounding regions and for mediating internal Habsburg disputes.

In 1624, he was elevated as Fürst (Prince) von Dietrichstein zu Nikolsburg, a hereditary title he could pass on to his nephew Maximilian and his legitimate male descendants. The Ditrichstein family went extinct with the death of the last Fürst in 1864.

In 1868, the title of Fürst von Dietrichstein zu Nikolsburg was recreated in the Austrian Empire for Count Alexander von Mensdorff-Pouilly, the husband of Countess Alexandrine von Dietrichstein-Proskau-Leslie (1824–1906), reviving the title previously held by his wife's family. Prince Alexander was first cousin to both Queen Victoria and her husband, Prince Albert of Saxe-Coburg and Gotha.

In 1635, Franz Seraph was banished from court and all of his possessions were confiscated, but the dispute was resolved later that year, his properties and titles were restored and he was appointed Cardinal-protector of the Holy Roman Empire. The following year he was also appointed Imperial governor in Moravia, Bohemia and Lower Austria.

== Private life ==
Although he never married, Franz Seraph had at least one extramarital child with already married Elisabeth, Baroness Berger von Berg (Perger z Pergu), born Kummer (b. 1594), second wife of Baron Georg Berger von Berg (Jiří Baron Perger z Pergu) (d. 1619), Imperial tax collector for Bohemia.

Their natural daughter, accepted legally as a daughter of her mother's husband, Baroness Johanna Franziska Berger von Berg (Perger z Pergu) (d. 1654), later married Count Franz von Magnis (1596–1652), as his second wife.

== Death ==
Franz von Dietrichstein died in September 1636 at the age of 66 in Brno (current Czech Republic).

== Ancestry ==
Ancestors of Franz von Dietrichstein

16. Georg von Dietrichstein
8. de:Pankraz von Dietrichstein
17. Elisabeth von Höffling
4. de:Siegmund von Dietrichstein
18. Johann Gössl von Thurn
9. Barbara Gössl von Thurn
19. Barbara von Obritschau
2. de:Adam von Dietrichstein
20. Emperor Frederick III
10. Emperor Maximilian I.
21. Empress Eleanor of Portugal
5. Barbara von Rottal
22. Christoph von Rappach
11. Margareta von Edelsheim
23. Salome z Boskovic
1. Franz, 1st Prince of Dietrichstein
24. Juan Ramón Folch de Cardona
12. Juan Ramón Folch IV de Cardona
25. ca:Joana d'Urgell
6. Antonio Folc de Cardona y Enriquez
26. Bernardino Fadrique Enríquez
13. Aldonza Enríquez de Quiñones
27. Teresa de Quiñones
3. Margarita Folch de Cardona y Requesens
28. Galceran de Requesens y Santa Coloma
14. Galcerán de Requesens i Joan de Soler
29. Isabel Joan de Soler
7. Ana María Requesens de Soler y Enríquez de Velasco
30. Alonso Enríquez de Guzmán
15. Beatriz Enríquez de Velasco
31. Juana Perez De Velasco
