= Dietrichstein family =

Austrian noble family

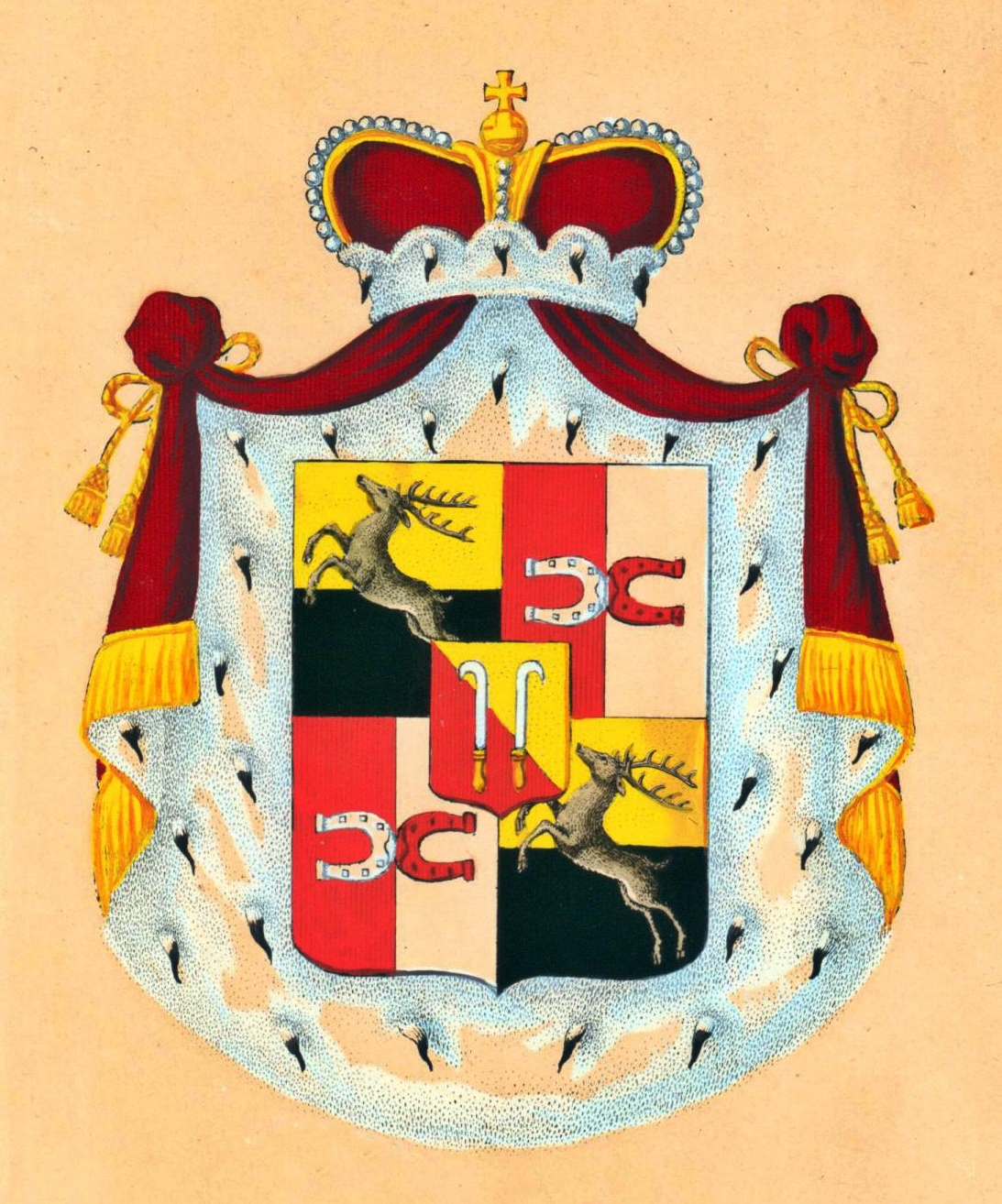
Princely coat of arms of the Dietrichstein-Proskau family

The House of Dietrichstein was one of the oldest and most prominent Austrian noble families originating in the Duchy of Carinthia. The family belonged to the high nobility (German: Hochadel). The Nikolsburg branch was elevated to the rank of Prince of the Holy Roman Empire in 1624, while a member of the Hollenburg branch was elevated to the same dignity in 1684. The family held two territories with imperial immediacy: the Principality of Dietrichstein, along with castles in Carinthia and Moravia; and the Sovereign Barony of Tarasp (now in Switzerland).

== History ==
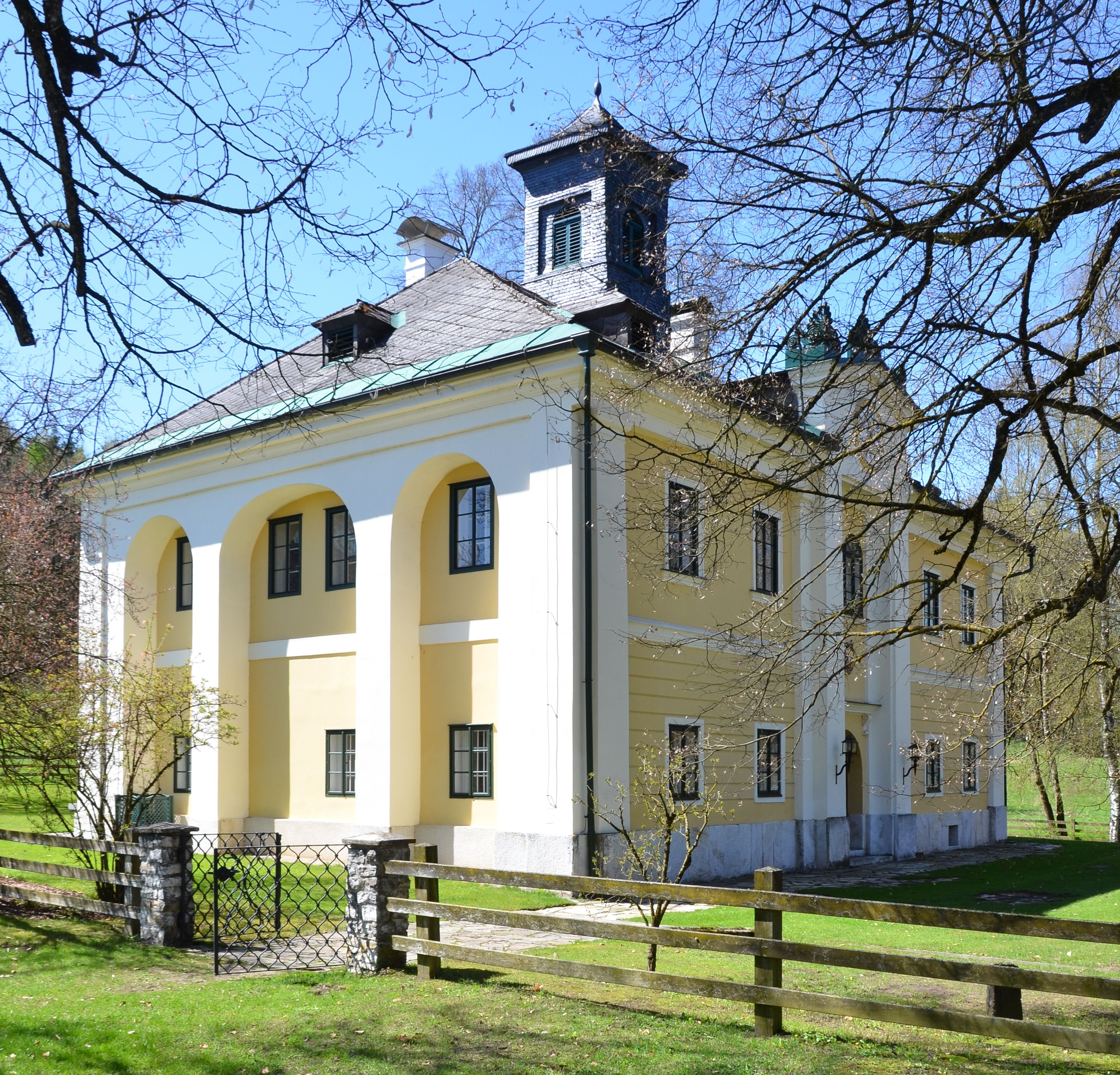
Dietrichstein Castle in Carinthia

Dietrichstein Castle near Feldkirchen in the Duchy of Carinthia was first mentioned in a deed of 1103. It was probably named long before, after a knight Dietrich von Zeltschach, who, in the 9th century, was in the service of the Carinthian dukes. In 1166, the Dietrichstein estates were acquired by the Prince-Bishops of Bamberg and enfeoffed to a family of ministeriales officials, who began to call themselves after the castle. When the line became extinct in early 14th century, the fief was inherited by Nikolaus I, another Carinthian ministerialis from nearby Nussberg Castle, whose descendants also called themselves von Dietrichstein.

In the late 15th century, the strategically important fortress overlooking the trade route along the Glan valley down to Sankt Veit was occupied by the Hungarian forces of King Matthias Corvinus and finally destroyed by Ottoman invaders in 1483. A new castle was erected below the ruins about 1500 and rebuilt in a Neoclassical style in 1840.

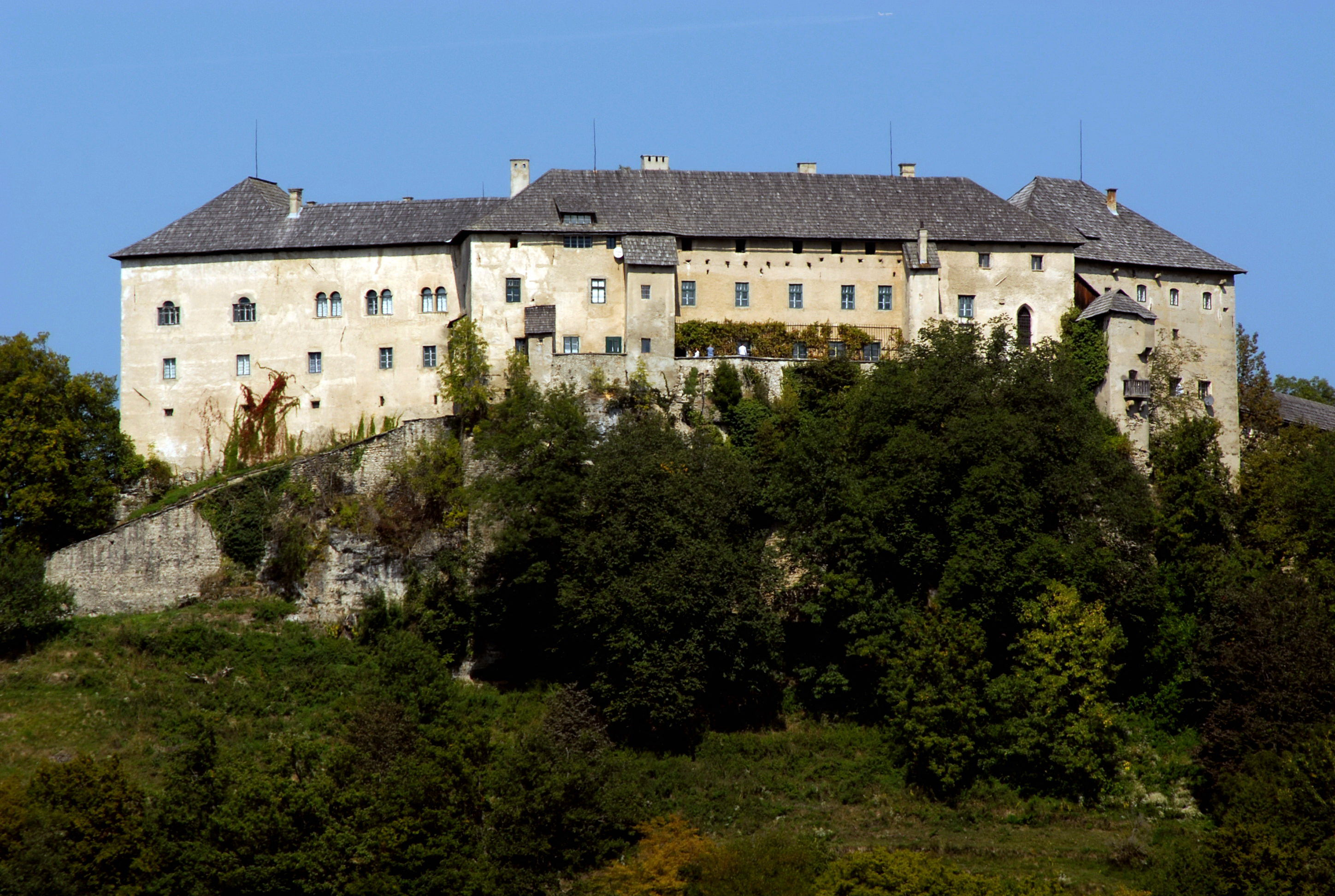
Schloss Hollenburg, Carinthia

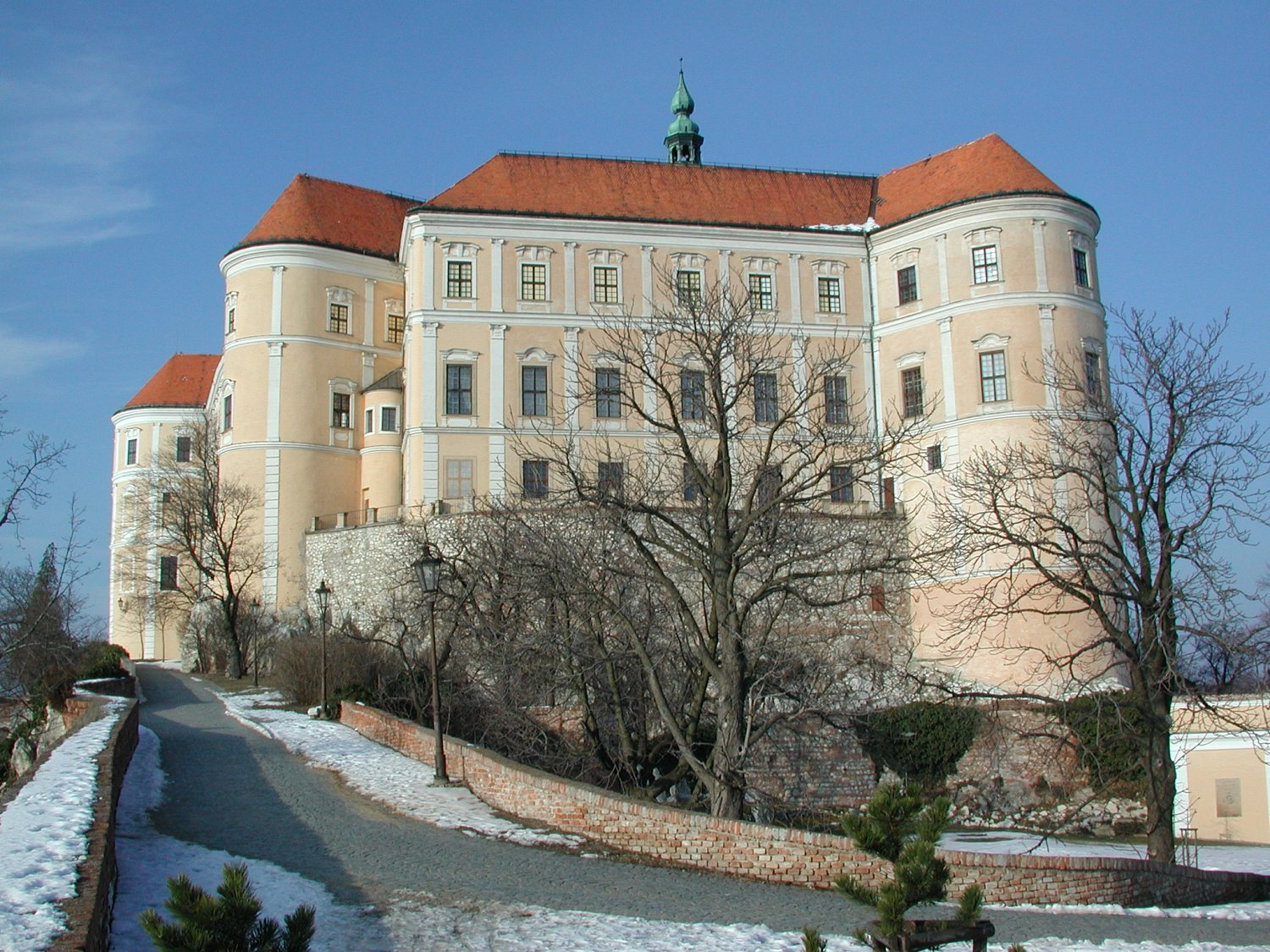
Mikulov Castle, Moravia

In 1514, Siegmund von Dietrichstein (1484–1533) purchased Hollenburg Castle from his father-in-law, the Habsburg emperor Maximilian I, who also elevated him to the hereditary rank of a Freiherr. He was married to Barbara von Rottal (1500–1550), illegitimate daughter of Emperor Maximilian with Margareta von Edelsheim (d. 1522). In 1572, their son Baron Adam von Dietrichstein (1527–1590) was vested with the extended estates of Nikolsburg (Mikulov) in Moravia by Emperor Maximilian II. Adam's grandson Baron Maximilian II von Dietrichstein was created Graf (Count) on 18 September 1612 and his uncle, the Olomouc bishop Franz von Dietrichstein (1570–1636), was elevated as Fürst (Prince) von Dietrichstein zu Nikolsburg in 1624.

The Nikolsburg branch also acquired the titles of Princely Barony of Tarasp (immediate state of the Holy Roman Empire) in 1684, Count of Proskau in 1769, and Count Leslie of Balquhain in 1802. In 1803 Napoleon annexed Tarasp to his then puppet Switzerland and relocated their lands in Sankt Gallen’s Neuravensburg. After the dissolution of the Holy Roman Empire in 1806 their territory was mediatized by the Kingdom of Württemberg.

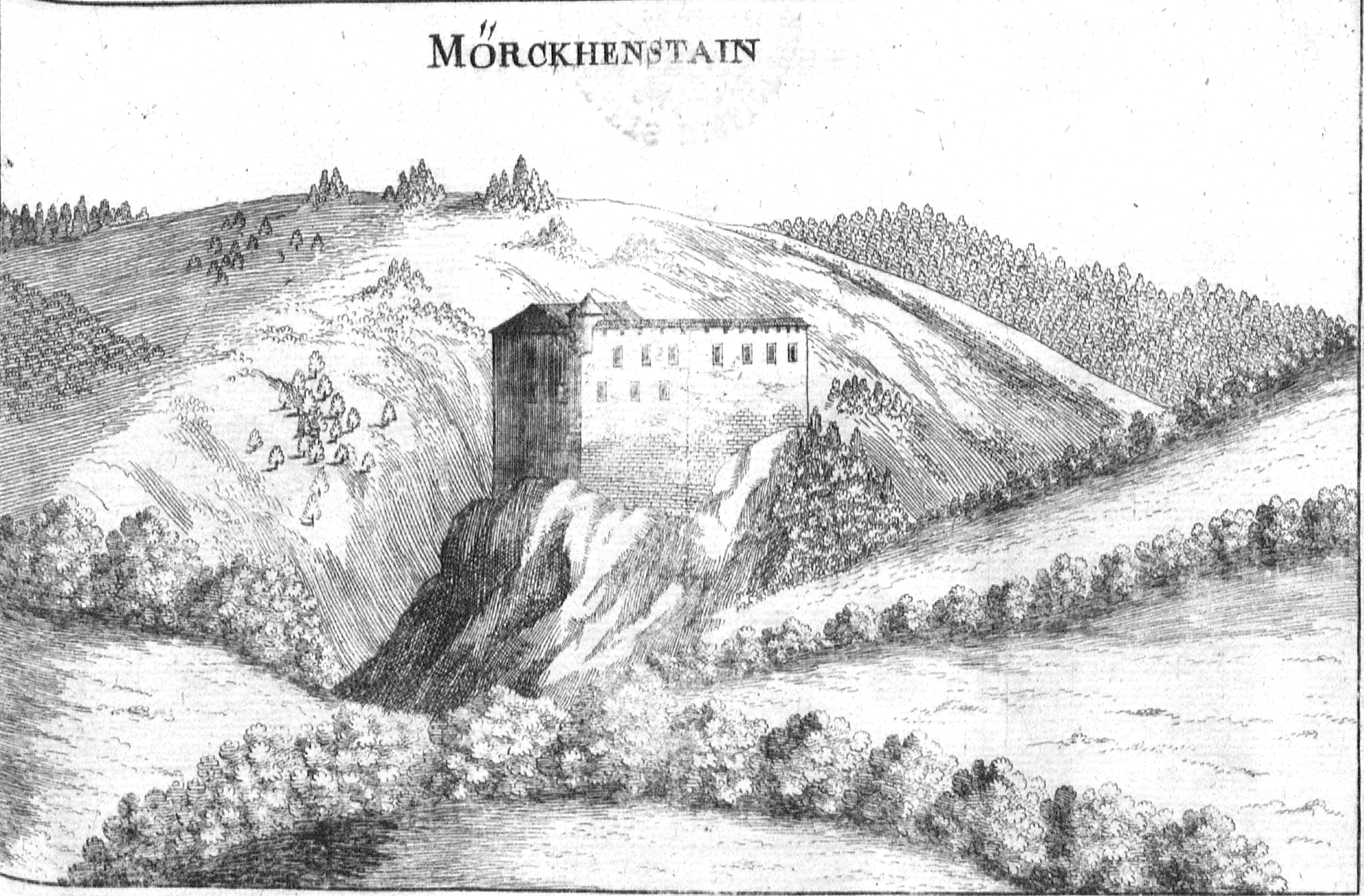
Burg Mörchenstain, Lower Austria

The line became extinct upon the death of Prince Moritz of Dietrichstein in 1864. Four years later, Alexander von Mensdorff-Pouilly, former Austrian foreign minister and husband of Moritz' cousin Alexandrine, was vested with the title of Prince by Emperor Franz Joseph I. The Princes of Mensdorff-Pouilly-Dietrichstein died out in male line in 1964 in Argentina, as the last Prince only had one daughter, Olga Maria de las Mercedes Theresia Margarete von Dietrichstein zu Nikolsburg (b. 1932).

== Princes von Dietrichstein-Proskau-Leslie ==
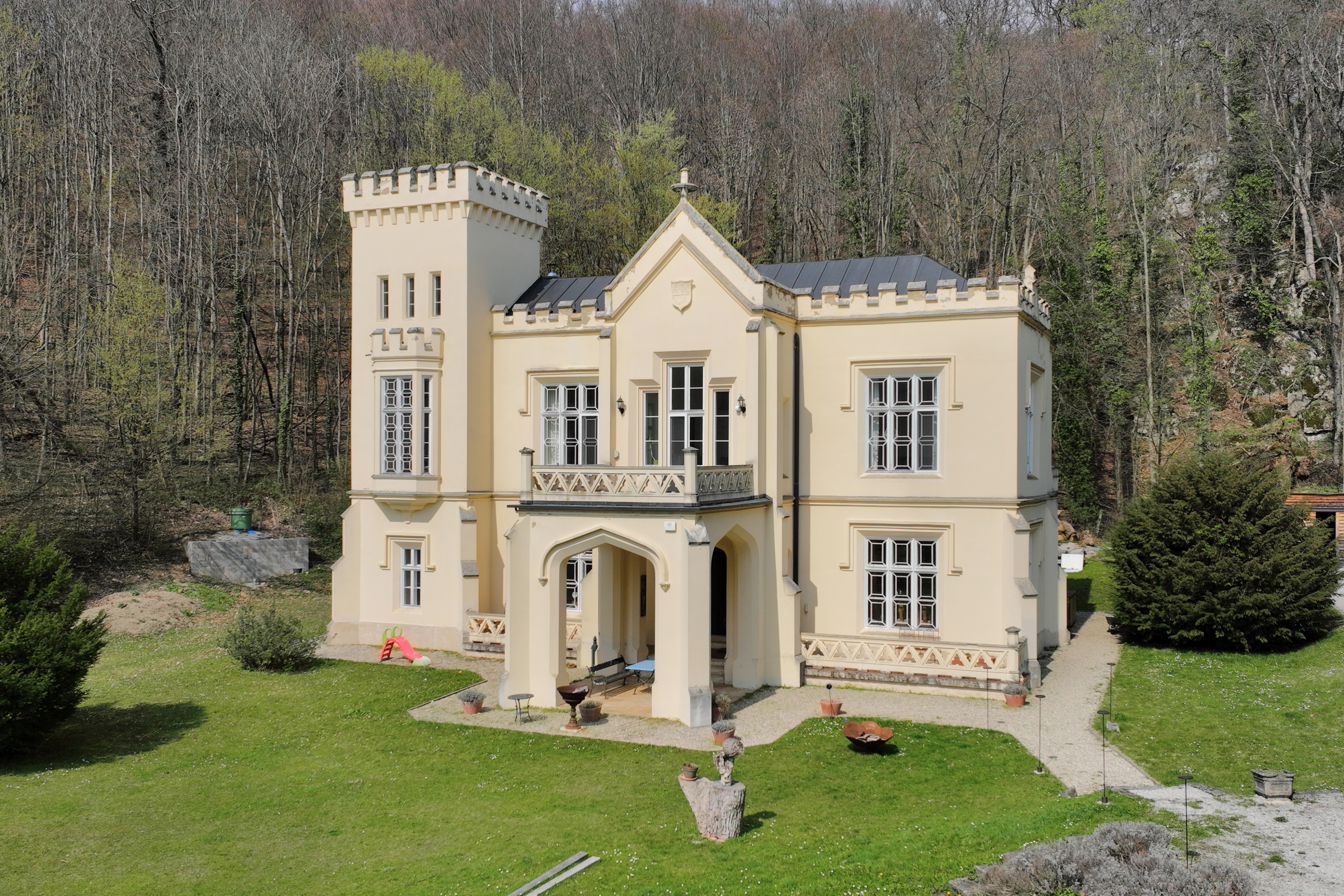
Schloss Merkenstein, Bad Vöslau

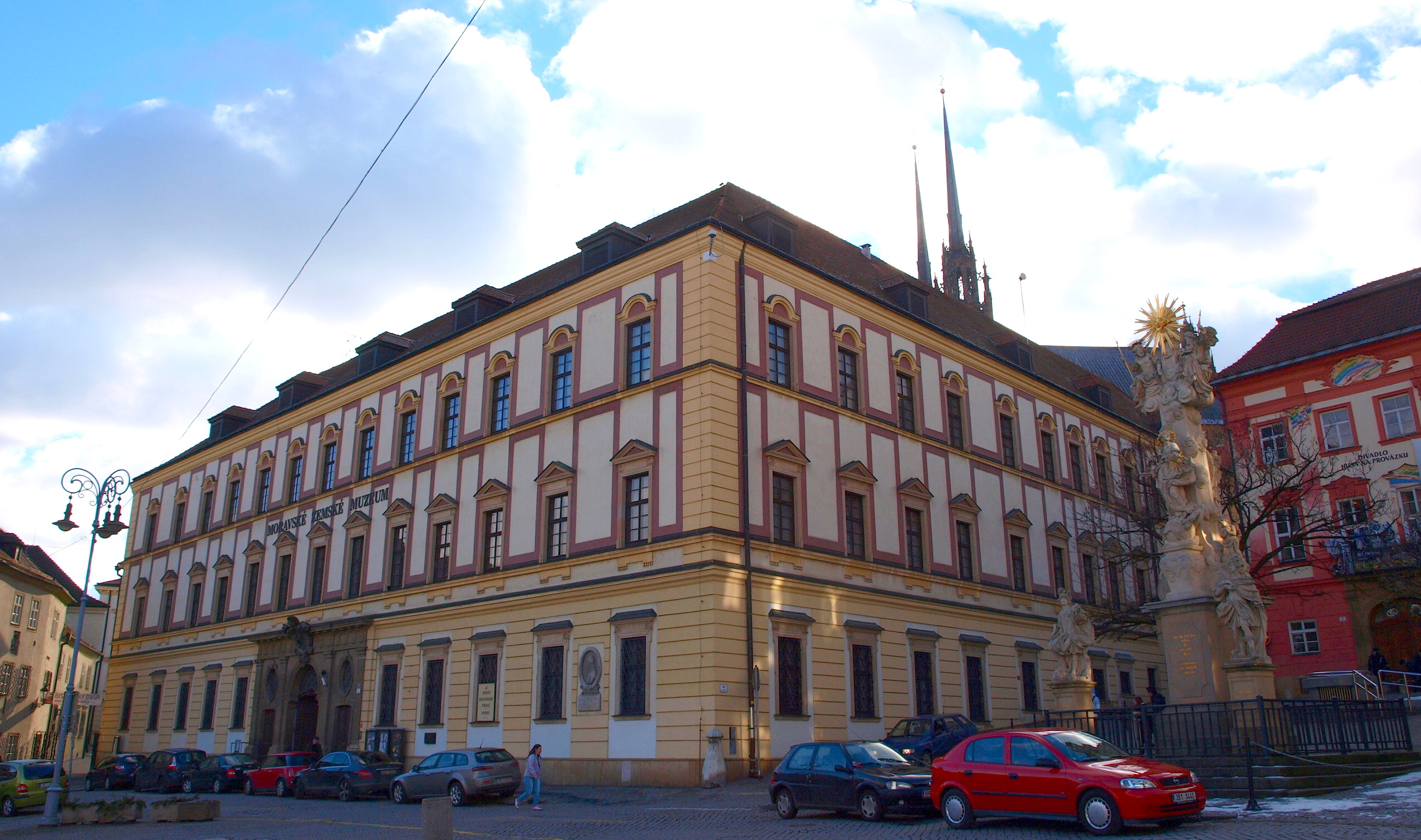
Dietrichstein Palace, residence of Franz von Dietrichstein in Brno

1. Franz Seraph (1570–1636), First Prince of Dietrichstein, Bishop of Olomouc, Cardinal and Landeshauptmann of Moravia.
2. Maximilian, Prince of Dietrichstein (1596–1655), nephew of the latter
3. Ferdinand Joseph, Prince of Dietrichstein (1636-1698), son of the latter
4. Leopold Ignaz Joseph, Prince of Dietrichstein (1660–1708), son of the latter
5. Walther Franz Xaver Anton, Prince of Dietrichstein (1664–1738), brother of the latter
6. Karl Maximilian Philipp Franz Xaver, Prince of Dietrichstein (1702–1784), son of the latter
7. Karl Johann Baptist Walther Sigismund Ernest Nepomuk Alois, Prince of Dietrichstein (1728–1808), son of the latter
8. Franz Seraph Joseph Carl Johann Nepomuc Quirin, Prince of Dietrichstein (1767–1854), son of the latter
9. Joseph Franz, Prince of Dietrichstein (1798–1858), son of the latter
10. Moritz Joseph Johann, Prince of Dietrichstein (1775–1864), son of Prince Karl Johann.

In 1857, Alexandrine, daughter of Prince Joseph Franz, married Count Alexander von Mensdorff-Pouilly. He served as Foreign Minister and Minister-President of Austria in the 1860s, and in 1868 was created Fürst von Dietrichstein zu Nikolsburg, reviving the title held by his wife's family.

1. Alexander Constantin, Prince of Dietrichstein (1813–1871)
2. Hugo Alfons Eduard Emanuel Joseph Johann Wenzeslaus, Prince of Dietrichstein (1858–1920), son of the latter
3. Alexander Albert Olivier Anton, Prince of Dietrichstein (1899–1964), son of the latter, the last holder of the title.

The diplomat Count Albert von Mensdorff-Pouilly-Dietrichstein was a younger son of Prince Alexander Constantin.

== Other notable members ==
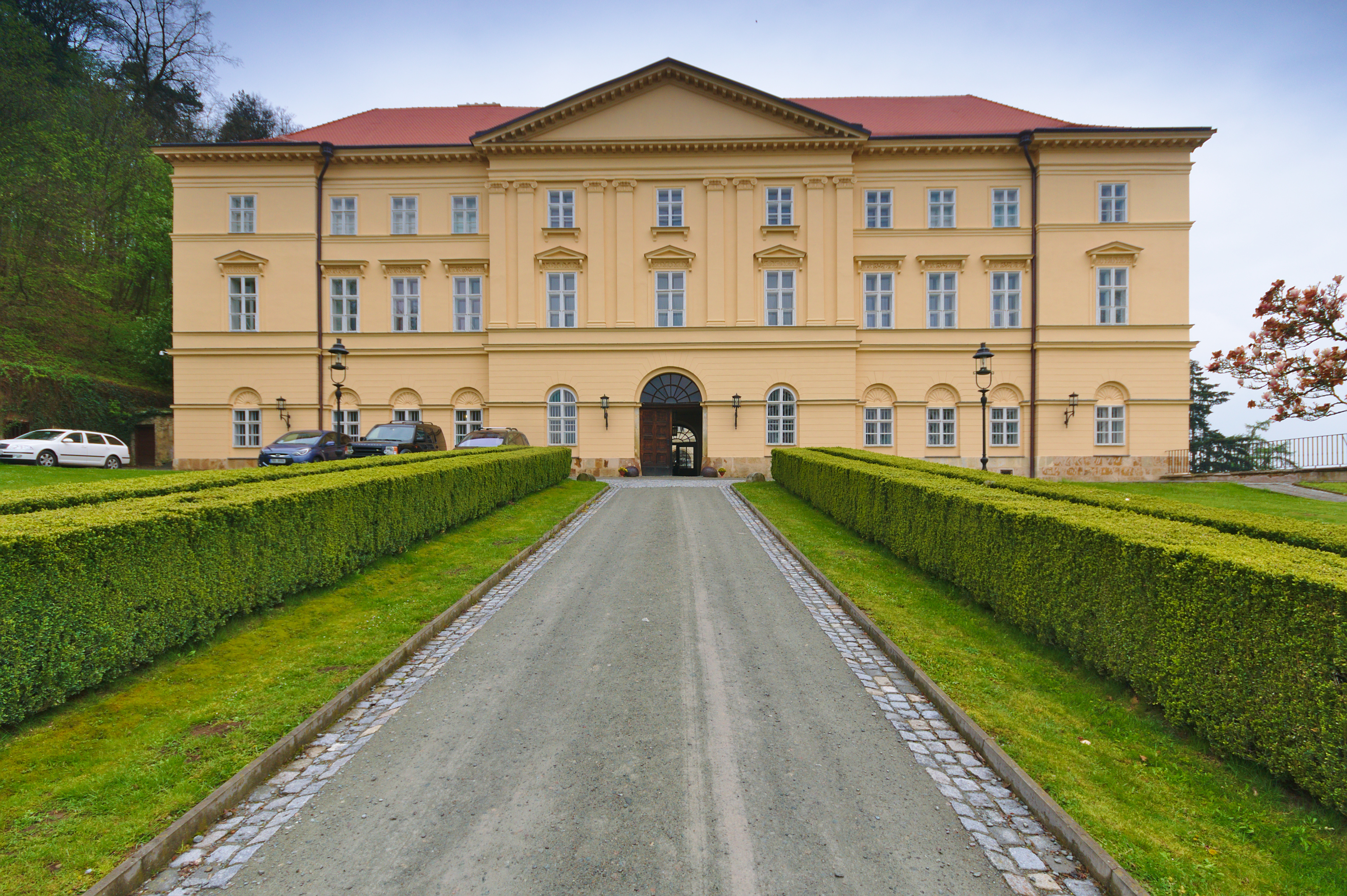
Boskovice castle, South Moravia

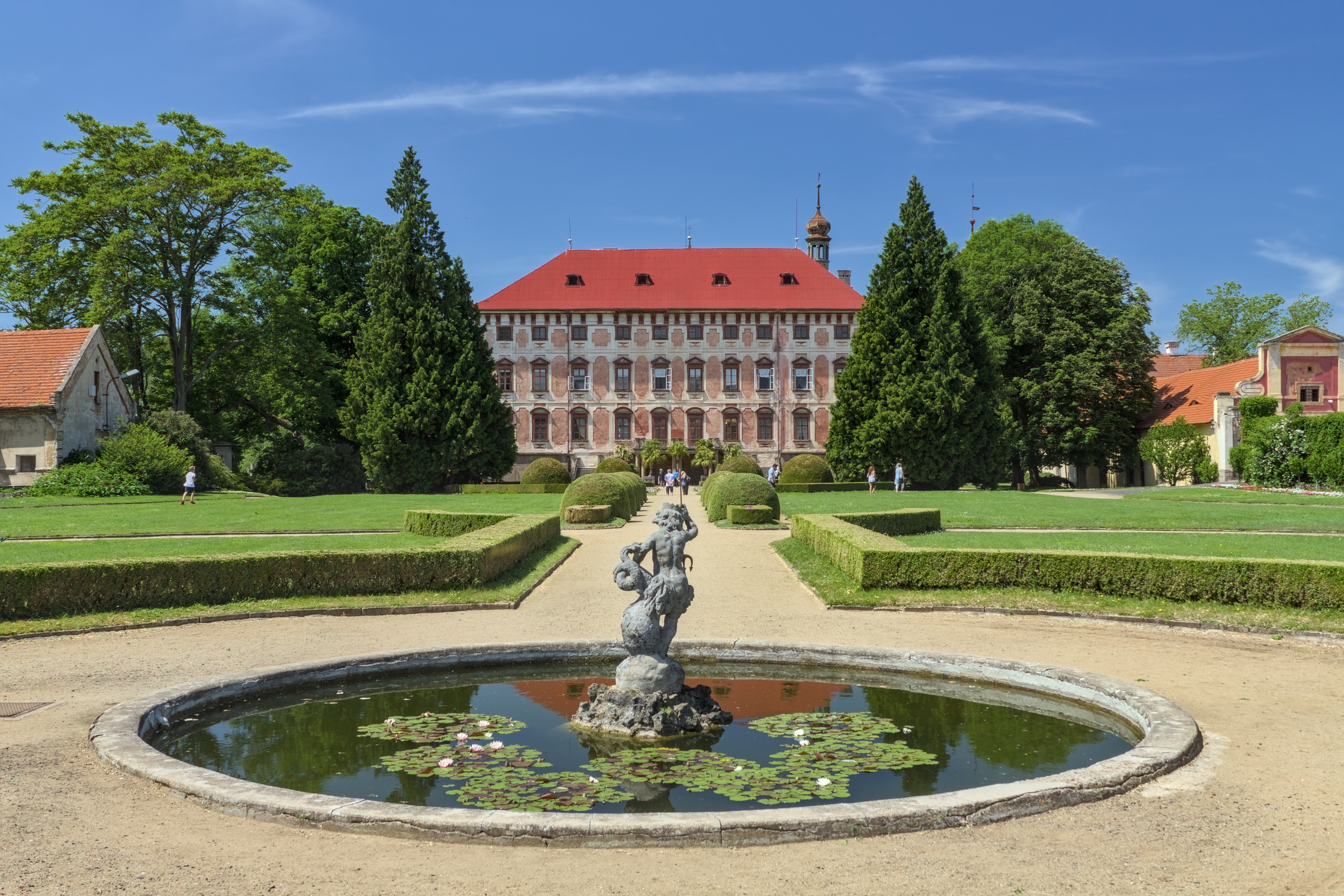
Libochovice castle, Bohemia

- Adam von Dietrichstein (1527-1590), the Holy Roman Empire's ambassador to Spain, who married Margarita Folch de Cardona, member of the powerful Spanish House of Folch-Cardona. They had thirteen children, seven of whom lived to adulthood:
  - Marie von Dietrichstein (1554 - after 1584)
  - Anton von Dietrichstein (1555-1555), died in infancy
  - Anna von Dietrichstein (1558-after 1582)
  - Sigmund von Dietrichstein, Freiherr von Hollenburg (1560-1602)
  - Anton von Dietrichstein (1563-1564), died in infancy
  - Hypolitha von Dietrichstein (1564-1595)
  - Johanna von Dietrichstein (1565-1570), died in childhood
  - Maximilian von Dietrichstein (1569 - 29 Mar 1611)
  - Franz Seraph von Dietrichstein, Prince of the Holy Roman Empire, Cardinal, Bishop of Olomouc (22 Aug 1570 - 19 Sep 1636)
  - Beatrix von Dietrichstein (1571-1631)
  - Elisabeth von Dietrichstein (1572-1580), died in childhood
  - Margaretha von Dietrichstein (1573-1582), died in childhood
  - Marianna von Dietrichstein (after 1574-after 1574), died in infancy
- Philipp Sigmund of Dietrichstein (1651–1716), Order of the Golden Fleece
- Andreas Jakob von Dietrichstein (1689–1753), Prince-Archbishop of Salzburg
- Clotilde Apponyi (1867-1942), Hungarian women's rights activist and diplomat.

== See also ==
- Mikulov Castle
- Burgruine Dietrichstein
- Dietrichstein tomb
- Schloss Hollenburg
- Libochovice Castle
- Boskovice Castle
- Dietrichstein Palace, Brno
