= Requesens =

Requesens is a Catalan surname. It may refer to:

== People ==
- Galceran de Requesens y Santa Coloma, Catalan nobleman
- Galceran de Requesens i Joan de Soler, his son, Catalan nobleman and naval commander
- Isabel de Requesens (1496-1532), his daughter, painted by Raphael
- Luis de Requesens y Zúñiga (1528—1576), Spanish politician and diplomat
- Juan Requesens (b.1989), Venezuelan politician
- Pedro III Fajardo de Zúñiga y Requesens (1602–1647), Spanish soldier and aristocrat
- Rafaela Requesens (b.1992), Venezuelan activist
- Juan de Zúñiga y Requesens (d. 1586), Spanish diplomat, viceroy of Naples

== Places ==
- Requesens Castle, Alt Empordà, Catalonia

== See also ==
- Recasens
- Spanish destroyer Cadarso, originally named Requesens
