= Mendel Medal =

Mendel Medal may refer to:

- Mendel Medal (genetics) (1958-), awarded by The Genetics Society, a UK learned society
- Mendel Medal (Villanova University) (1929-), awarded for achievement in science by scientists of religious conviction
- Mendel Medal (Germany) (1967-), awarded by the German National Academy of Sciences Leopoldina
- Gregor Johann Mendel Honorary Medal for Merit in the Biological Sciences (1965-), awarded by the Czech Academy of Sciences
- Mendel Memorial Medal (1992-), awarded by the Moravské zemské muzeum in Brno, Czech Republic
- Gregor Johann Mendel Medal, awarded by Mendel University in Brno to people and organizations involved in science and business.
