= Franz Josef Kupido =

Czech entomologist

Franz Josef Kupido sometimes Cupido (6 August 1786, Brno- 17 December 1863) was a entomologist principally interested in Lepidoptera. He was born in Bohemia and did most of his work while a resident of the Austrian Empire.

Franz Josef Kupido was a Beamter. His collection is in the Moravian Museum, Brno. In 1825 Kupido described the autumn emperor moth, Perisomena caecigena.
