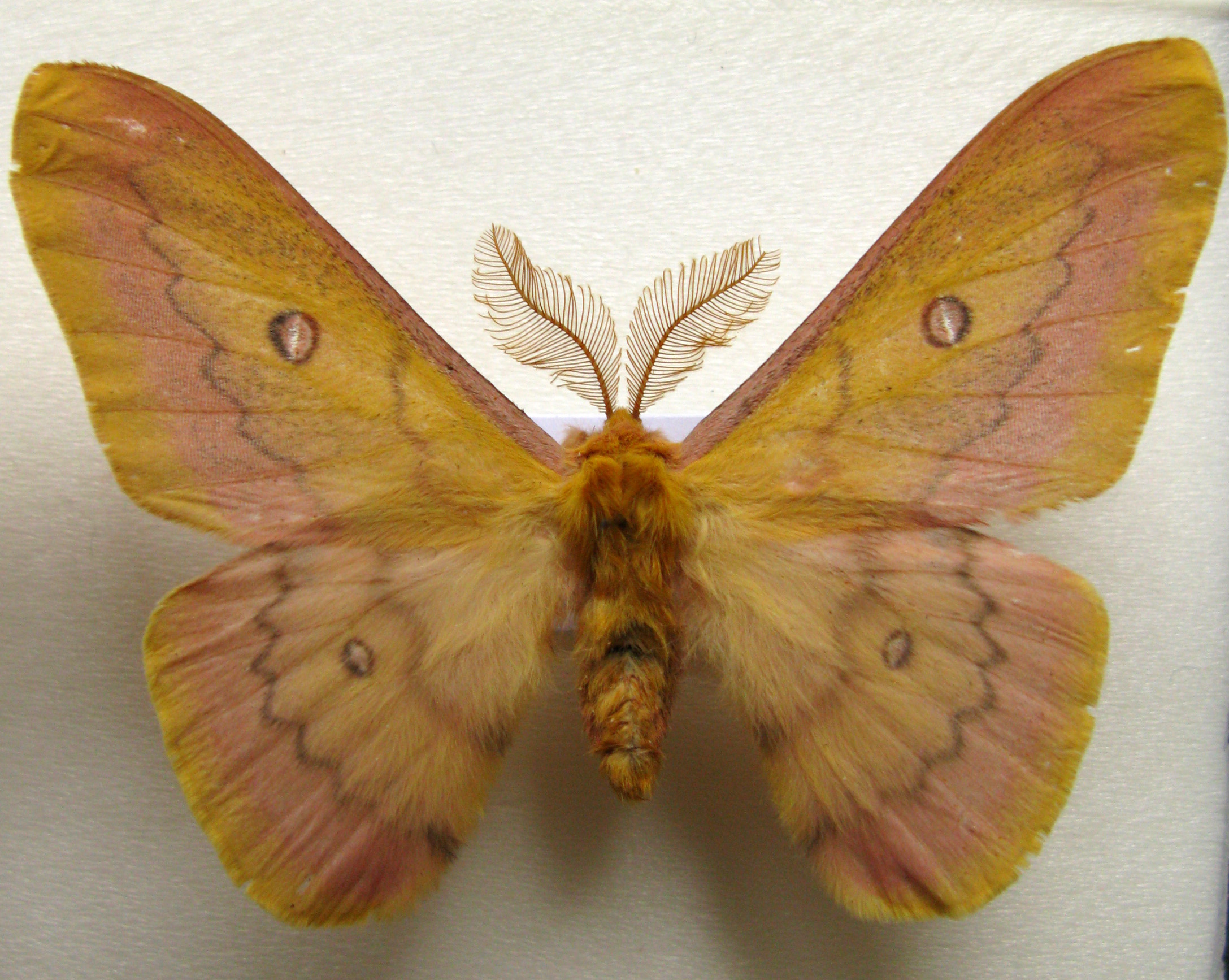

Scientific classification
- Kingdom: Animalia
- Phylum: Arthropoda
- Class: Insecta
- Order: Lepidoptera
- Family: Saturniidae
- Genus: Perisomena
- Species: P. caecigena

Binomial name
- Perisomena caecigena (Kupido, 1825)

Synonyms
- Saturnia caecigena Kupido, 1825; Perisomena unicolor Schultz, 1910; Perisomena derosata Schawerda, 1914; Perisomena wiskotti Niepelt, 1914; Perisomena transcaucasica O. Bang-Haas, 1927; Perisomena parviocellata Friedel, 1968

= Perisomena caecigena =

Species of moth

Perisomena caecigena, the autumn emperor moth, is a moth of the family Saturniidae, first described by Franz Josef Kupido in 1825. It lives in Italy (east of Venice near the Croatian border) and then from south-eastern Austria through Hungary, Slovenia, Croatia, Serbia, Albania, the western Ukraine, Romania, Bulgaria and Greece to most of Turkey and the Caucasus Mountains of the Republic of Georgia, Armenia and Azerbaijan. There is also an isolated population in the mountains of Lebanon and Israel. Subspecies stroehlei is endemic to the Troodos Mountains of Cyprus.

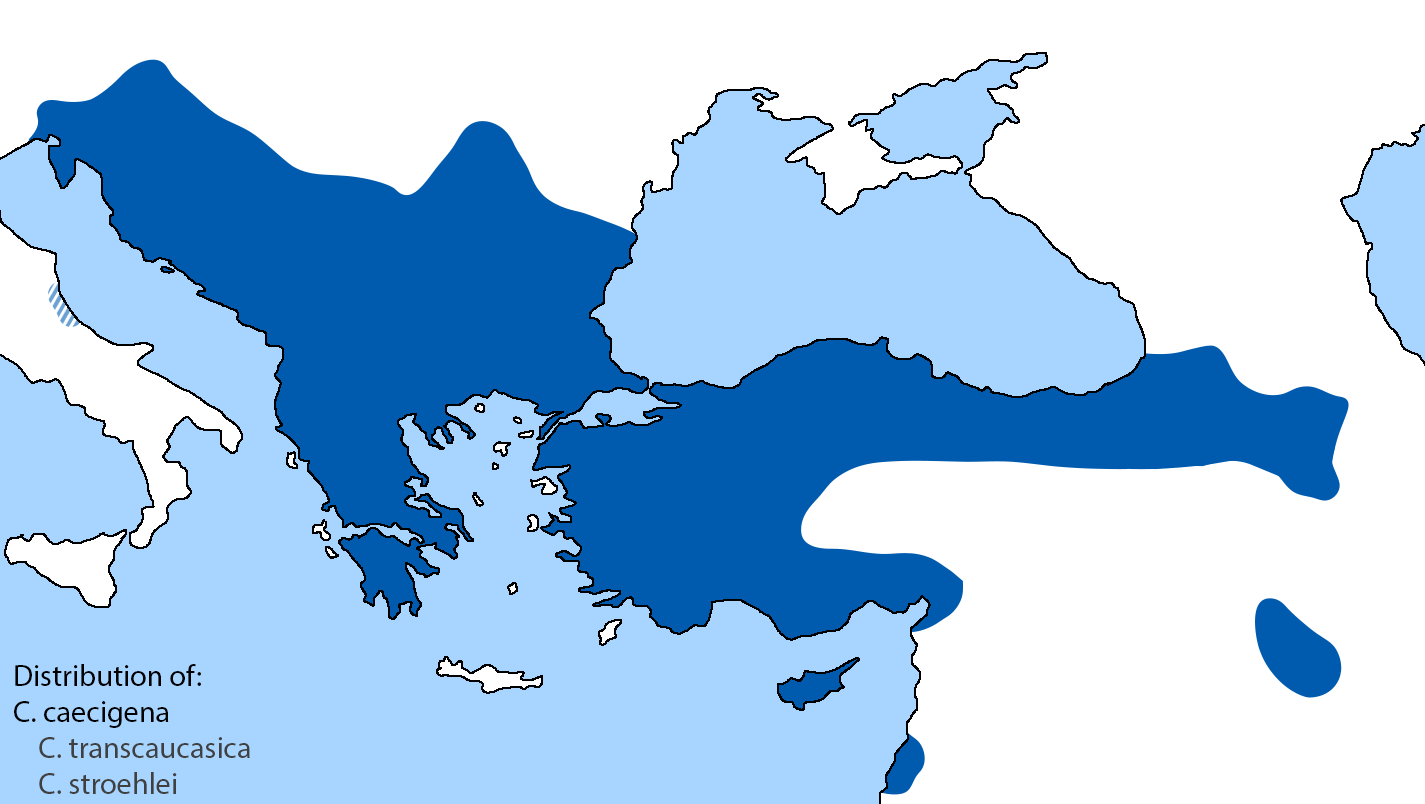
Range of P. caecigena

The wingspan is 62–88 mm for subspecies caecigena and 40–65 mm for males and 48–90 mm for females of subspecies stroehlei. Adults are on wing from late September to early November.

The larvae feed on Quercus species, including Quercus robur, Quercus petrea, Quercus pubescens, Quercus cerris and Quercus ilex, but also Populus alba, Populus nigra, Fraxinus, Pyrus and Prunus. Salix might also be a host plant, since larvae have been reared on Salix caprea in captivity.

== Subspecies ==
- Perisomena caecigena caecigena
- Perisomena caecigena stroehlei
