= Budišov =

- Market town
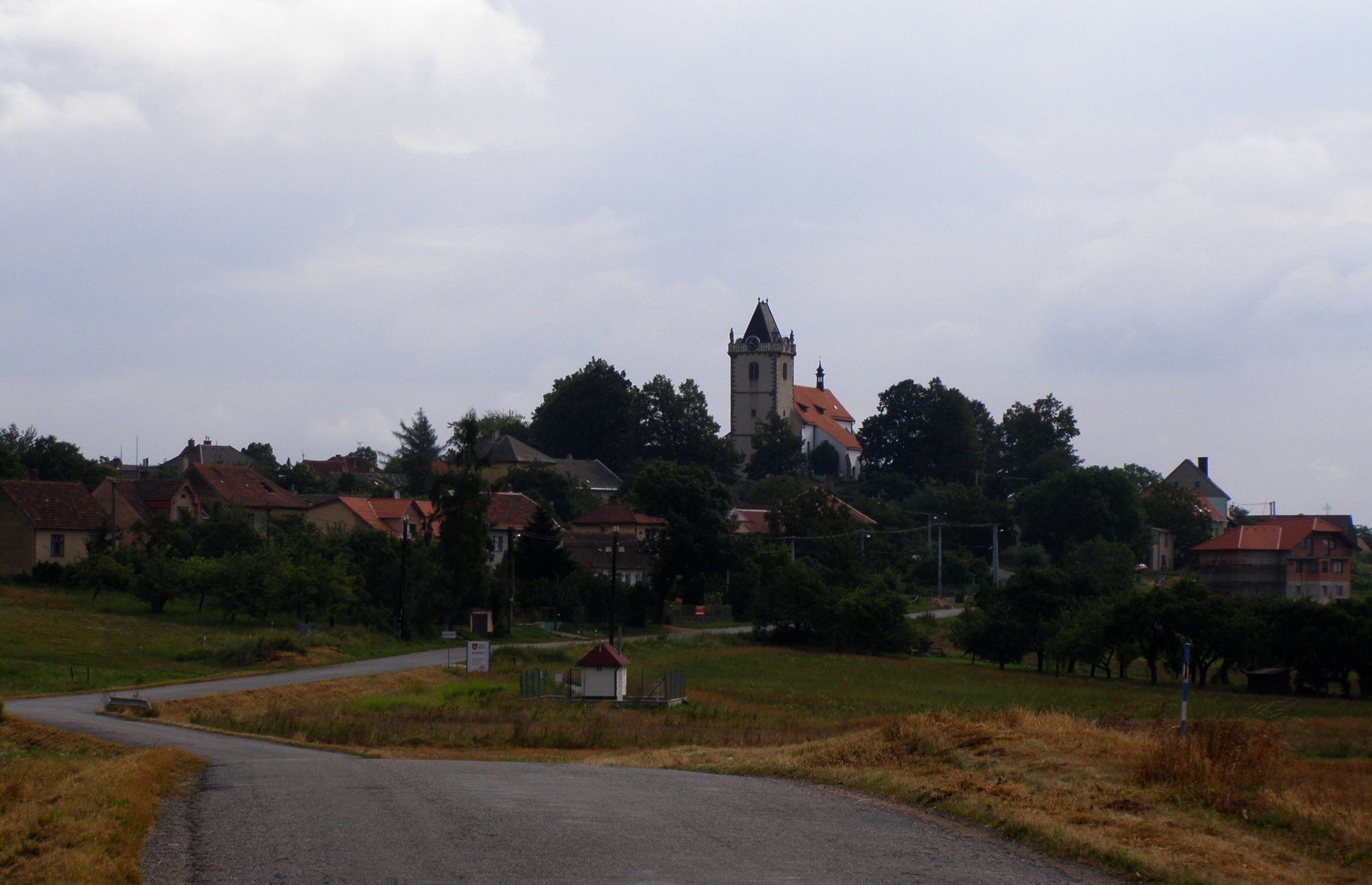
- View from the west

- Flag Coat of arms

- Location in the Czech Republic
- Coordinates: 49°16′17″N 16°0′14″E
- Country: Czech Republic
- Region: Vysočina
- District: Třebíč
- First mentioned: 1298

Area
  - Total: 13.30 km^{2} (5.14 sq mi)
- Elevation: 480 m (1,570 ft)

Population (2026-01-01)
  - Total: 1,193
  - Density: 89.70/km^{2} (232.3/sq mi)
- Time zone: UTC+1 (CET)
  - Summer (DST): UTC+2 (CEST)
- Postal code: 675 03
- Website: www.mestysbudisov.cz

Budišov (Czech pronunciation: [ˈbuɟɪʃov]; German: Budischau) is a market town in Třebíč District in the Vysočina Region of the Czech Republic. It has about 1,200 inhabitants.

== Administrative division ==
Budišov consists of two municipal parts (in brackets population according to the 2021 census):

- Budišov (1,099)
- Mihoukovice (107)

== Geography ==
Budišov is located about 10 kilometres (6 mi) northeast of Třebíč and 43 km (27 mi) west of Brno. The southwestern part of the municipal territory lies in the Jevišovice Uplands and the northeastern part lies in the Křižanov Highlands. The highest point is at 538 m (1,765 ft) above sea level. A notable body of water is the fishpond Pyšelák, but there are also several other smaller fishponds.

== History ==
The first written mention of Budišov is from 1298. The village was promoted to a market town in 1538 by Emperor Ferdinand I. Among the most notable owners of Budišov was the noble families of Berka of Dubá and Paar.

== Demographics ==
Historical population

Year	Pop.	±%
1869	1,055	—
1880	1,136	+7.7%
1890	1,202	+5.8%
1900	1,178	−2.0%
1910	1,189	+0.9%

Year	Pop.	±%
1921	1,164	−2.1%
1930	1,136	−2.4%
1950	1,078	−5.1%
1961	1,173	+8.8%
1970	1,213	+3.4%

Year	Pop.	±%
1980	1,153	−4.9%
1991	1,131	−1.9%
2001	1,163	+2.8%
2011	1,218	+4.7%
2021	1,206	−1.0%

Source: Censuses

== Transport ==
Budišov is located on the railway line Žďár nad Sázavou–Studenec.

== Sights ==
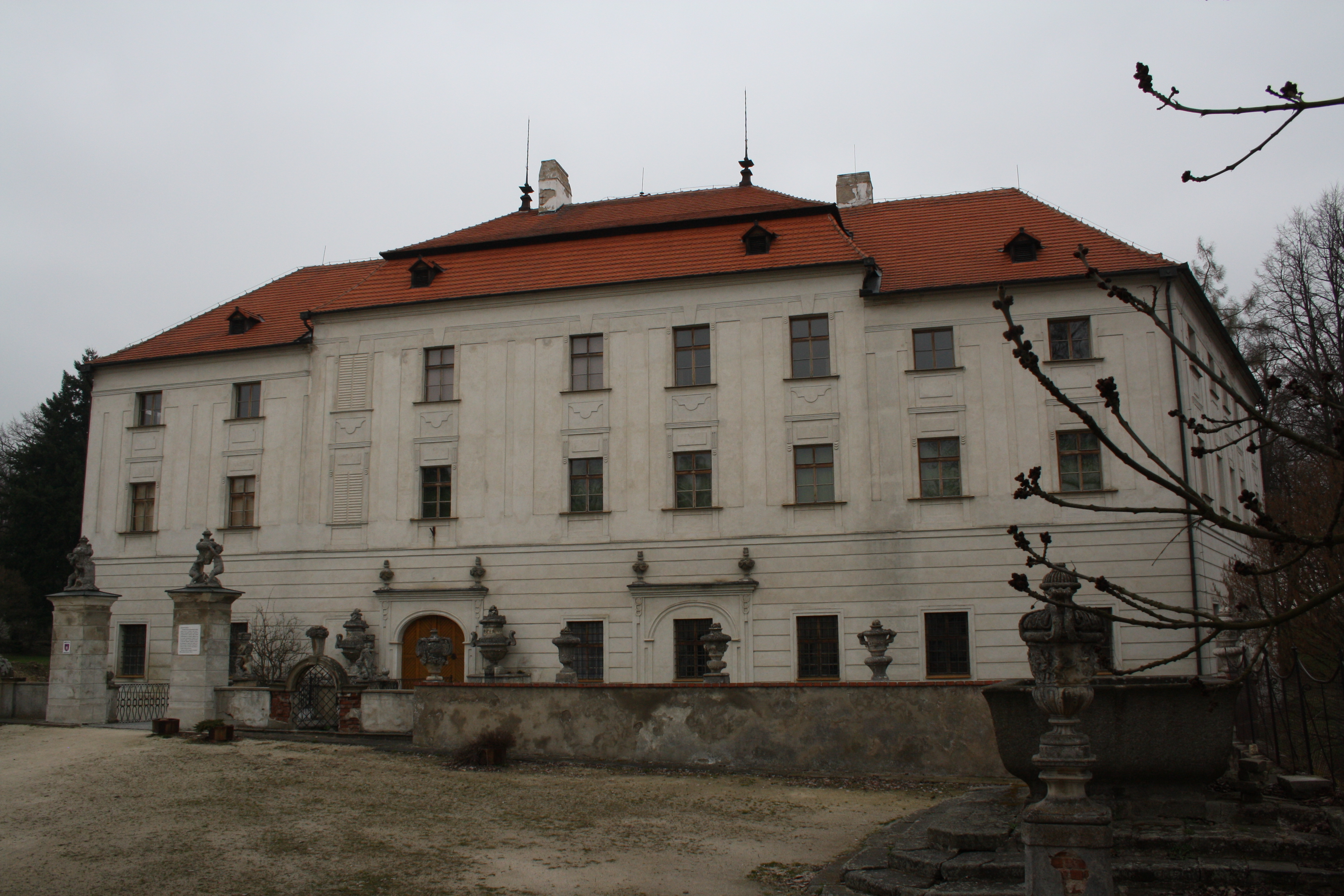
Budišov Castle

The Church of Saint Gotthard is a valuable Gothic building with a late Romanesque core and later modifications. It has a Baroque prismatic tower with a unique, over 4 metre high weather vane.

The Budišov Castle is the second notable landmark of the market town. The original water fortress from the 13th century was rebuilt into the Renaissance castle in 1573 by Václav Berka of Dubá. After 1715, the castle was rebuilt into the representative Baroque residence by the Paar family. The castle is surrounded with a large landscape park. Since 1974, the castle has been managed by the Moravské zemské muzeum. It is open to the public.
