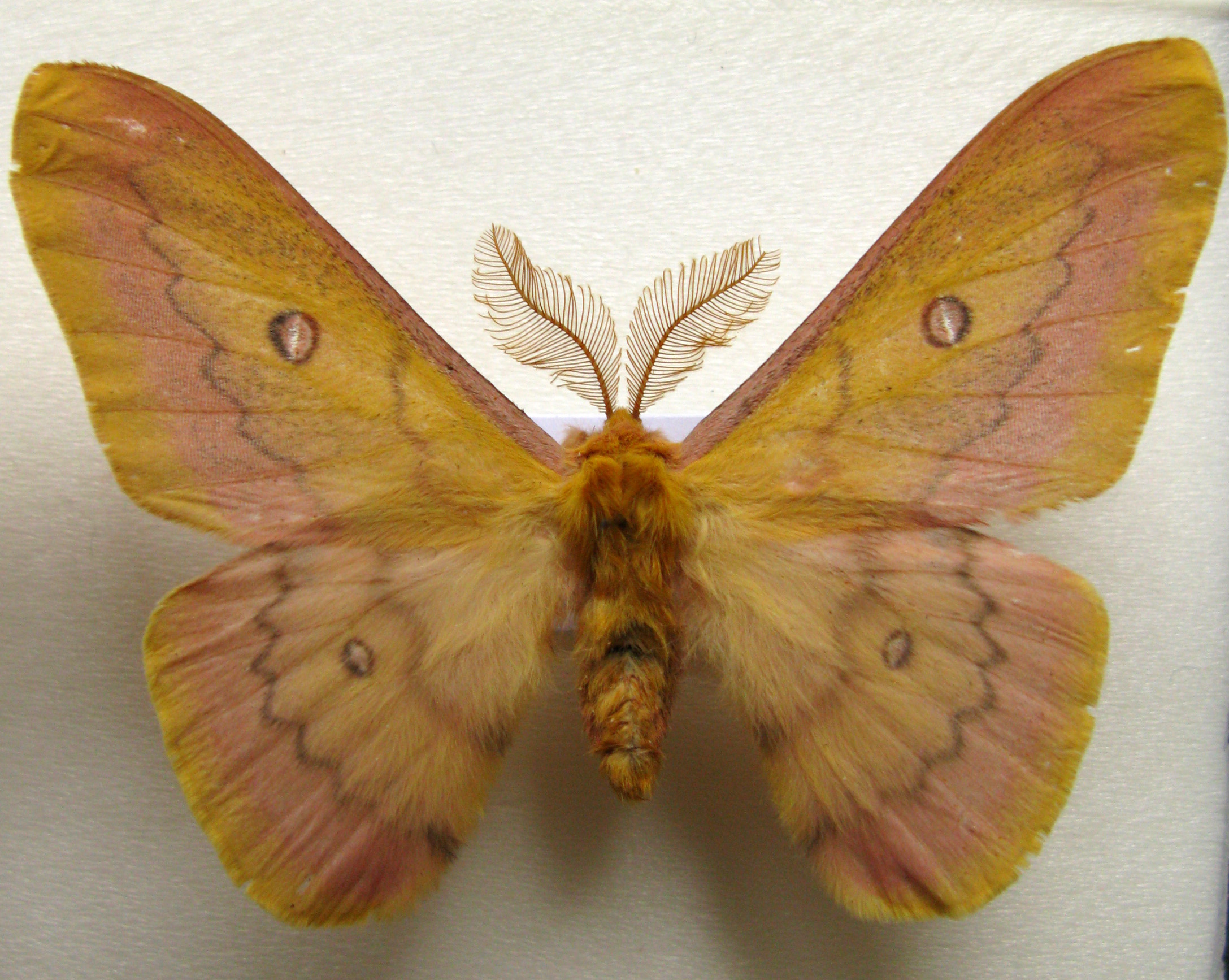
- Perisomena caecigena

Scientific classification
- Kingdom: Animalia
- Phylum: Arthropoda
- Class: Insecta
- Order: Lepidoptera
- Family: Saturniidae
- Subfamily: Saturniinae
- Genus: Perisomena; Walker, 1855

= Perisomena =

Genus of moths

Perisomena is a genus of moths in the family Saturniidae.

== Species ==
- Perisomena alatauica (Bang-Haas, 1936)
- Perisomena caecigena (Kupido, 1825)
- Perisomena codyi (Peigler, 1996)
- Perisomena haraldi (Schawerda, 1922)
- Perisomena huttoni (Moore, 1862)
- Perisomena stoliczkana (Felder & Felder, 1874)
- Perisomena svenihedini (Hering, 1936)

== See also ==
- A. R. Pittaway (2007-04-06). "Saturniidae of Europe".
- Wolfgang A. Nässig (2006-11-16). "Saturnia Homepage".
