= Margarita de Cardona =

Spanish court official

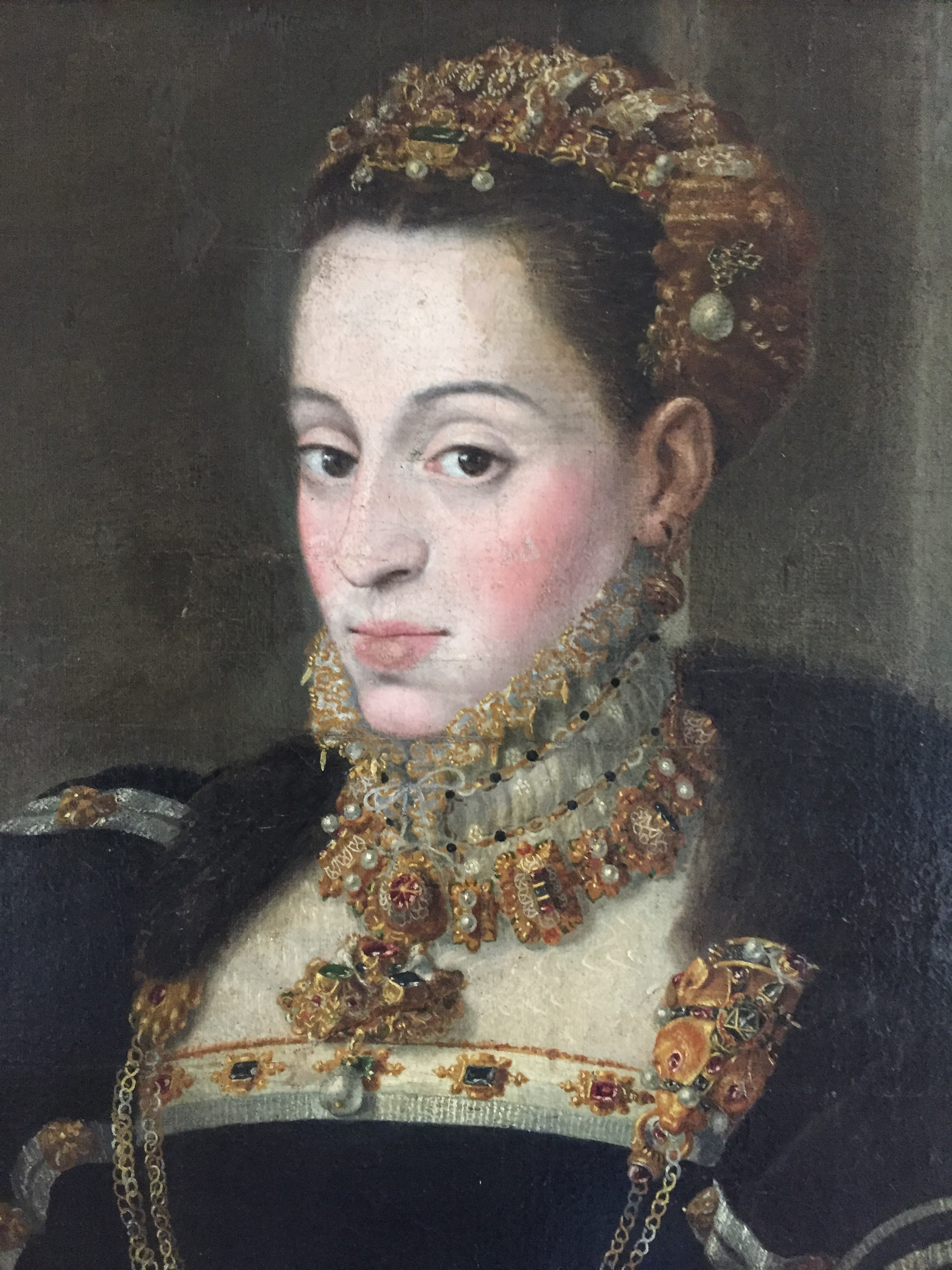
Portrait of Doña Margarita de Cardona

Margarida Folc de Cardona i Requesens (1535 – 23 February 1609) was a Spanish court official. She was a lady-in-waiting to the Holy Roman Empress Maria of Spain between 1548 and 1581. She had an influential position in the court of the Empress, and her correspondence with her spouse and daughter Anna von Dietrichstein gives valuable documentation about the politics of a royal household and its members.

== Life ==
Born as a member of the House of Cardona, Margarida was the daughter of the Catalan nobles Antonio Folc de Cardona y Enriquez and his wife, Maria de Requesens (d. 1577). Margarida de Cardona was appointed maid of honour to princess Maria prior to her marriage to Maximilian.

She accompanied Maria to Austria in 1551. In 1553, she married the German diplomat and court official Baron Adam von Dietrichstein (17 October 1527- 15 January 1590), maternal grandson of Emperor Maximilian I. They had thirteen children, seven of whom lived to adulthood.

Her mother served as chief-lady-in-waiting to Maria in 1554-77, and Margarita de Cardona herself was appointed lady-in-waiting after her marriage to the chamberlain and cousin of Maximilian II, Holy Roman Emperor. Margarita de Cardona and Adam von Dietrichstein, along with Marie Manrique de Lara y Mendoza (1538-1608) and her husband Wratislav von Pernstein, belonged to the intimate circle of strictly Catholic courtiers preferred by Maria in Austria.

In 1563, Margarita left for Spain with her spouse, who had been appointed to serve as the governor of Maria's sons Rudolf and Ernst. In 1570, she was appointed to the task of organizing the household of the new queen of Spain, Anna of Austria. Her daughters and her sisters were all ladies-in-waiting to Queen Anna of Spain and the Spanish princesses, and Margarita illustrates the influence a lady-in-waiting could have in affecting the appointments for court offices.

In 1573, she returned to Austria and resumed her post as lady-in-waiting to Maria. Margarita de Cardona accompanied Maria back to Spain when Maria was widowed and died in Spain.

== Sources ==
- Nadine Akkerman: The Politics of Female Households: Ladies-In-Waiting Across Early Modern Europe (2013)
