= Recasens =

Recasens is a surname of Catalan origin. Notable people with the surname include:

- Ángel Recasens (1938–2007), Catalan organist, teacher, composer and musicologist
- Luis Recasens (1903–1977), Spanish politician and legal philosopher

== See also ==
- Requesens (disambiguation)
