= Luis de Requesens y Relat =

Spanish politician (died 1469)

Luis de Requesens y de Relat (died 1469) was Catalan baron of Altafulla, baron of La Nou de Gaià, both in the province of Tarragona, Spain.

== Family ==
Son of baron Luis de Requesens y Montoliu, deceased after 1382. His mother, from the "de Relat" Catalan family, should be probably related to Bishop for the Christian communities living at Morocco, North Africa, Francesc de Relat, deceased in Morocco in 1327, sent in 1309 there by the king James II of Aragon, (1267 - king 1291 - 1327), a.k.a. king James I of Sicily, (1267 - king of Sicily 1285 to 1296), to negotiate the freedom of 44 Catalan warriors, and confirmed by Avignon Roman Catholic Pope Clement V, (circa 1264 - Pope 1305 - 1314), a.k.a. Raymond Bertrand de Got. This Bishop seems to have played also a role in the permission to notorious Majorcan alchemist and philosopher, Raymond Lull, (1232 - 1315), to preach Christianity in Tunisia, 1314 - 1316, based on the previous good terms settled up there, including trade, by exiled Castilian Prince Henry of Castile, "The Senator", (1230 - 1304), the cadet brother of king Alfonso X of Castile, (1221 - 1284), who had fought there with another cadet brother, Fadrique of Castile, at the service of Hafsid king of the Algeria - Tunisia- Libya region Muhammad I al-Mustansir, ( - ruler 1249 - 1277).

Luis de Requesens y de Relat came in 1396 from Sicily to help Martin, the father of king Martin I of Sicily "The younger", (circa 1374/1376 — consort king of Sicily after 1384 - Widower king of Sicily 1401 - July 25, 1409), married in 1384 to Maria of Sicily, Duchess of Athens, (1366 - Queen of Sicily 1380, aged 14 – 1401) to take the vacant Aragonese crown of his brother and uncle respectively, no male issue, John I of Aragon, (1350 - king 1387 - 1396).

Therefore, Prince Martin of Aragon, the father of this Martin I of Sicily, took the Aragonese crown as Martin I of Aragon in 1396 while his son was king consort of Sicily earlier and till 1401, whereby his wife, the Queen Maria of Sicily, Duchess of Athens, died. Then, when Martin I of Sicily died in 1409, his aging father, the king Martin I of Aragon, successor in 1396 of John I of Aragon was known in Sicily, during 1409 and 1410, when he died, as Martin II of Sicily.

In other words, oddly enough, Martin II of Sicily, was the father of Martin I of Sicily, something rather unusual as far as Monarchies go.

Luis de Requesens y de Relat went to Sardinia Island too, in 1408, both with Martin I of Sicily and with his father Martin I of Aragon to fight a revolt there in the city of Arborea.

When king Martin I of Aragon died in 1410, his son Martin I of Sicily having died in 1409, there was no valid male issue for the kingship of the Crowns of Aragon, Sicily, Sardinia and the Catalan Counties globalised by then as a unit, in Barcelona.

It was agreed that the succession crisis in the widely scattered Mediterranean Empire of the king of Aragon should be solved by political deputies representing several of the kingdoms and lands amalgamated, at Caspe, Zaragoza. The new king, a sickly Castilian Royal Prince, a cadet brother of the sickly king of Castile, Henry III of Castile, (1379 - 1406, aged 27), a.k.a. "Henry the Sufferer", a.k.a. "Henry the Infirm", a.k.a. Enrique III el Doliente in Spanish would be chosen in 1412, the elected being known aince then as Ferdinand I of Aragon "Trastamara", (1380 - elected king of the widely scattered Empire of the king of Aragon - 1312 - 1316, aged 35). He had even respected his very young (orphaned) nephew John, a.k.a. John II of Castile, rather than longing for the Castilian crown indeed.

The new elected king appointed Luis de Requesens y de Relat, Governor of Catalonia in 1515, which he occupied till his death in 1426. Married to Constanza de Santa Coloma, the chatelaine of Santa Coloma de Farners, province of Girona, got the bases for a powerful family.

== Deaths ==
One of his sons, Bernat de Requesens y Santa Coloma was financial agent for king Alfonso V of Aragon, a.k.a. king Alfonso I of Naples, (king 1416 - deceased 1458), for Alfonso V brother, king Juan II of Aragon, (king 1458 - 1479), for bastard king Ferrante I of Naples, the son of king Alfonso I of Naples by Giraldona Carlino, above mentioned, and for the unfortunate first son of king Juan II of Aragon, Prince Charles of Viana, who rather unexpectedly died in 1461.

Bernat, became Viceroy of Sicily, 1463 - 1464. He died in 1469.

Another brother of Bernat de Requesens y Santa Coloma was Galceran de Requesens y Santa Coloma, who died in exile at Valencia in 1465.
