= Mikulov Castle =

Castle in Mikulov, Czech Republic

Coordinates: 48°48′23.4″N 16°38′09.9″E

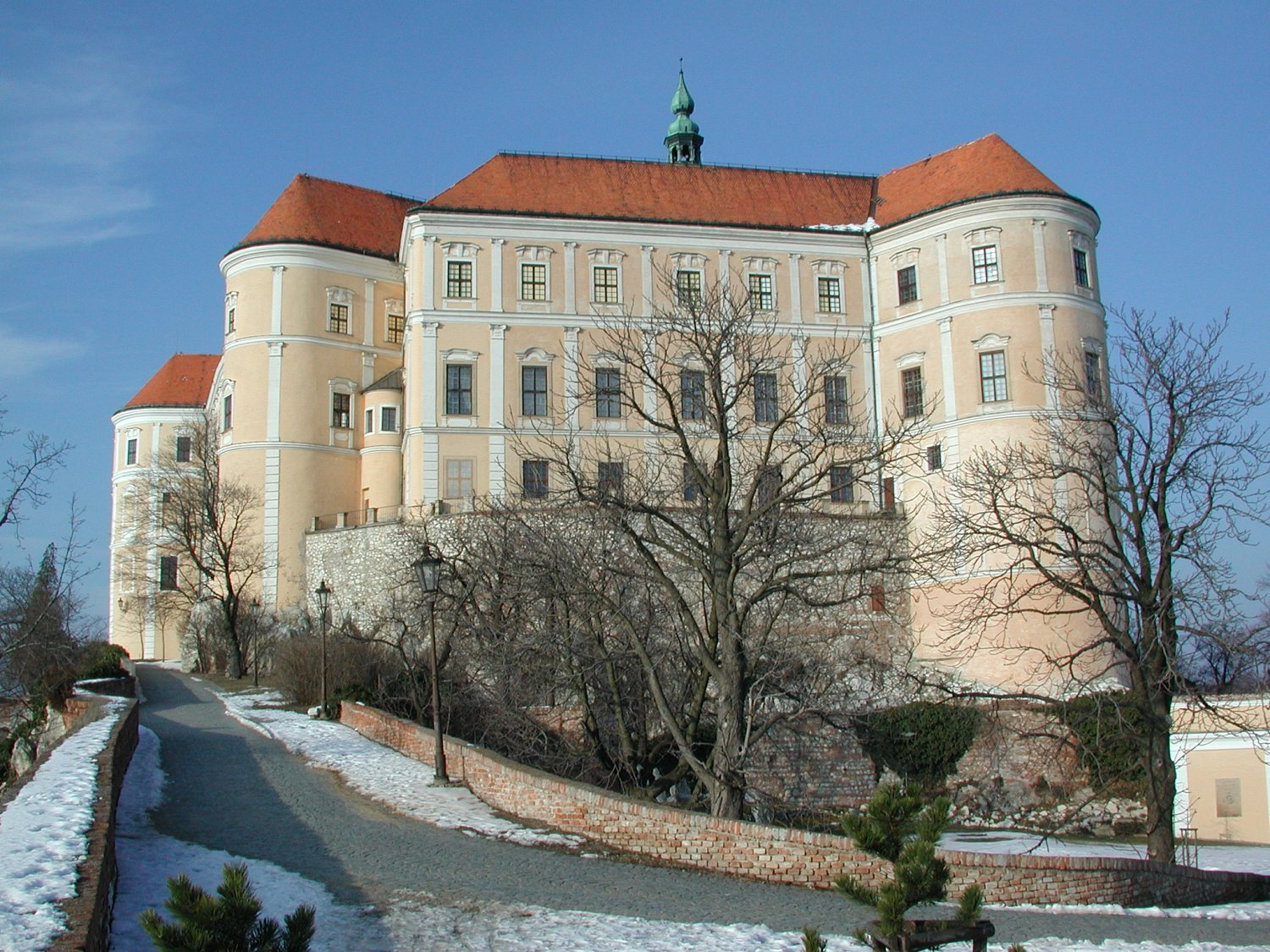
Mikulov Castle

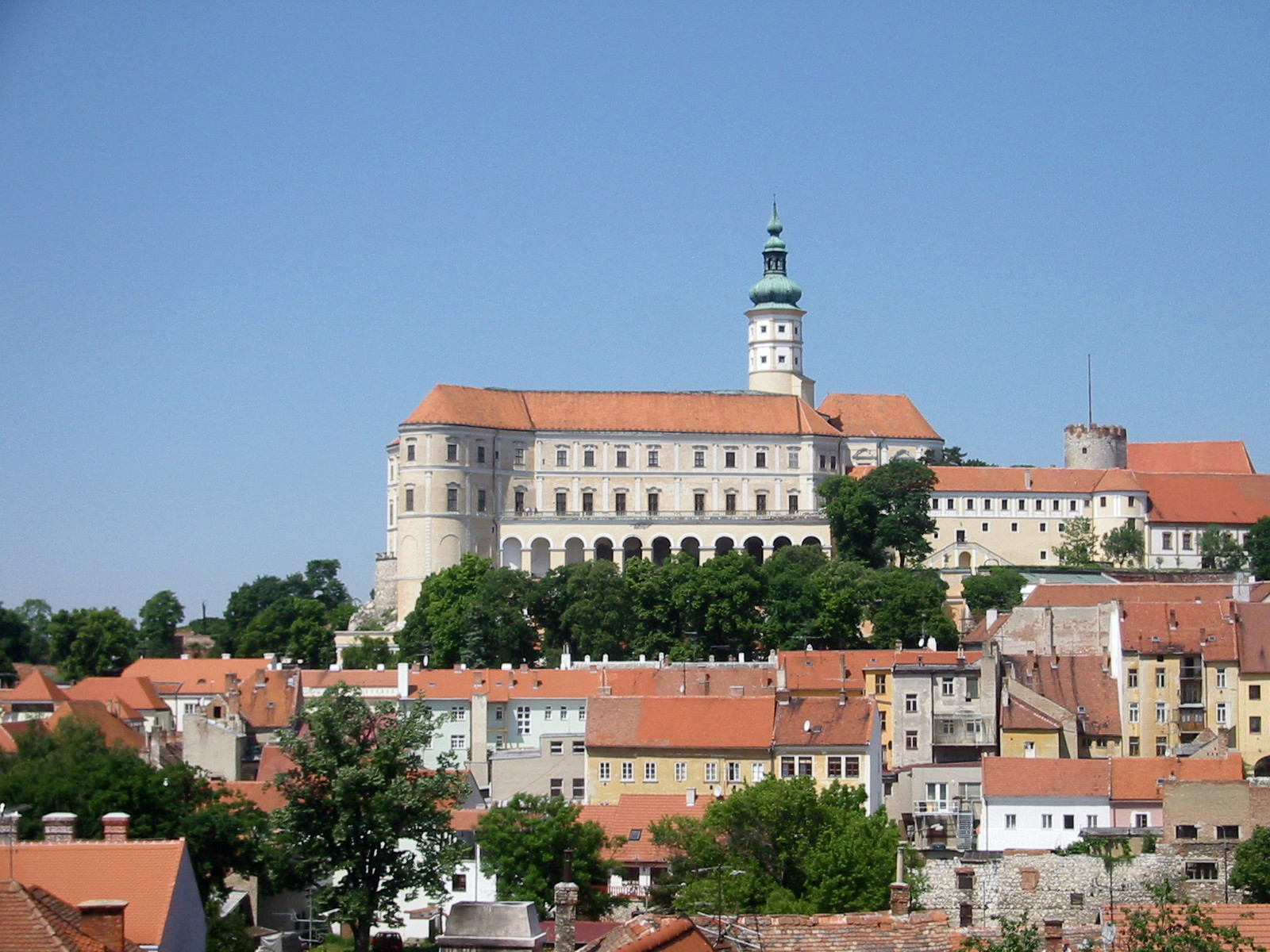
Mikulov Castle

Mikulov Castle (German: Nikolsburg) is a castle in the town of Mikulov in South Moravian Region of the Czech Republic. The castle is on a site of historic Slavonic settlement, where the original stone castle was erected at the end of the 13th century.

The end of World War II saw the castle destroyed by a fire whose origins are unclear.

During the war, the anthropological collection from the Moravské zemské muzeum had been moved to Mikulov Castle for safekeeping purposes. Many of the most important discoveries from Předmostí u Přerova, Dolní Věstonice and the Mladeč caves were destroyed by the fire.
