= House of Quiñones =

Spanish noble family

The House of Quiñones (Casa de Quiñones) is an old and noble Spanish family that emerged in Castile and León in the 12th century and became one of the most prominent dynasties of the Spanish kingdom until the 20th century. The original family gave rise to several branches, one of which became Conts of Luna from the 15th century to the 19th century, in turn giving rise to other branches including the marquesado de Alcedo.

== Origin ==
The founder of what became the House of Quiñones was an Asturian nobleman named Pedro Alvarez Quiñones, who is first seen in the mid 12th-century as tenente (Lord) of Luna and lord of the village of Quiñones del río in León. The family would come to be known by a toponymic surname indicating their derivation from the latter village. One of these traced said this man married with Violante Ponce de León, family of Kings of León with one daughter of a King Alfonso IX of León. A son named Suero and trunk of the lineage fought in the war of succession of the house of burgundy. His was son Pedro S. Quiñones de Mendoza, he was general of the border and he married Juana G. Bazan but when he had no succession, his sister Leonor inherited him, who will be the third lady of Luna's house. The Quiñones lineage continued through the Middle Ages in the reconquest of the southern peninsula against the Arabs and established itself as a first-rank noble house, fighting in the internal struggles of the House of Trastamara, playing a leading role in politics Castilian since they belonged to the royal lineage. Several current Spanish noble families derive from the House of Quiñones: the House of Count of Luna, as direct heirs of Violante Ponce de León, and its small count of Bañuelos. From the House of Luna (Counts since 1462) come the lesser noble houses of the Marquesados de Alcedo (since 1891) San Carlos o Montevirgen (created in 1796 for Charles VII of Napoles) from which There were and there are many gentlemen in Europe. In the House of Count of Luna, the marriage bonds- since its foundation has always been with families of equal or higher rank, noble descent and economy.
