= Antonio de Cardona y Enríquez =

Antonio Folc de Cardona y Enriquez (deceased 1555), was a Spanish noble and Viceroy of Sardinia (1534-1549).

== Biography ==
He was a cadet son of Joan Ramon Folc de Cardona, 1st Duke of Cardona, (1446-1513), title awarded in 1482 by Ferdinand II of Aragon and Isabel I of Castile, 5th Count of Cardona till 1482, and Marquis of Pallars since 1491, title awarded by the same Royal Couple.
His mother was "Aldonza Enriquez y Fernandez de Quiñones", Lady of Elche and Crevillente, born 1450, married 1467, 9th child from the second marriage of Fadrique Enriquez, 2nd hereditary Admiral of Castile with Teresa Fernandez de Quiñones y de Luna.

Throughout his life, he held various positions, including Commander of the Order of Santiago and Viceroy of Sardinia (1534-1549). During his governorship of the island, noteworthy events include his welcoming of Charles V on his way to the Conquest of Tunis (1535) and his enforcement of Royal justice against the Sardinian Arquer, Eimeric and Sabata clans.

=== Marriage and children ===
He married "Ana Maria de Requesens y Enriquez", daughter of seafarer and naval commander Galceran de Requesens, 1st Count of Palamós, (1439 - Barcelona, 1505).

They had 2 sons and 5 daughters :

- Juan de Cardona y Requesens, Baron of Sant Boi, Captain General of the Galleys of Sicily and Naples, Viceroy of Navarre, 1595 - 1610. With issue.
- Margarita Folch de Cardona y Requesens, deceased 23 February 1609. She married, 1553, Adam Herr zu Dietrichstein-Nikolsburg, (9 October 1527 - 5 January 1590), closely associated and family related to Rudolf II, Holy Roman Emperor. With issue.
- Francesc de Cardona.
- Anna de Cardona, Baroness of Sant Boi. Married twice. With issue in Sardinia island.
- Beatriu de Cardona. With Spanish-Calabrese nobility issue.
- Jeronima de Cardona.
- Joana de Cardona
