= Burgruine Nussberg =

Castle in Austria

- Carinthia, Austria
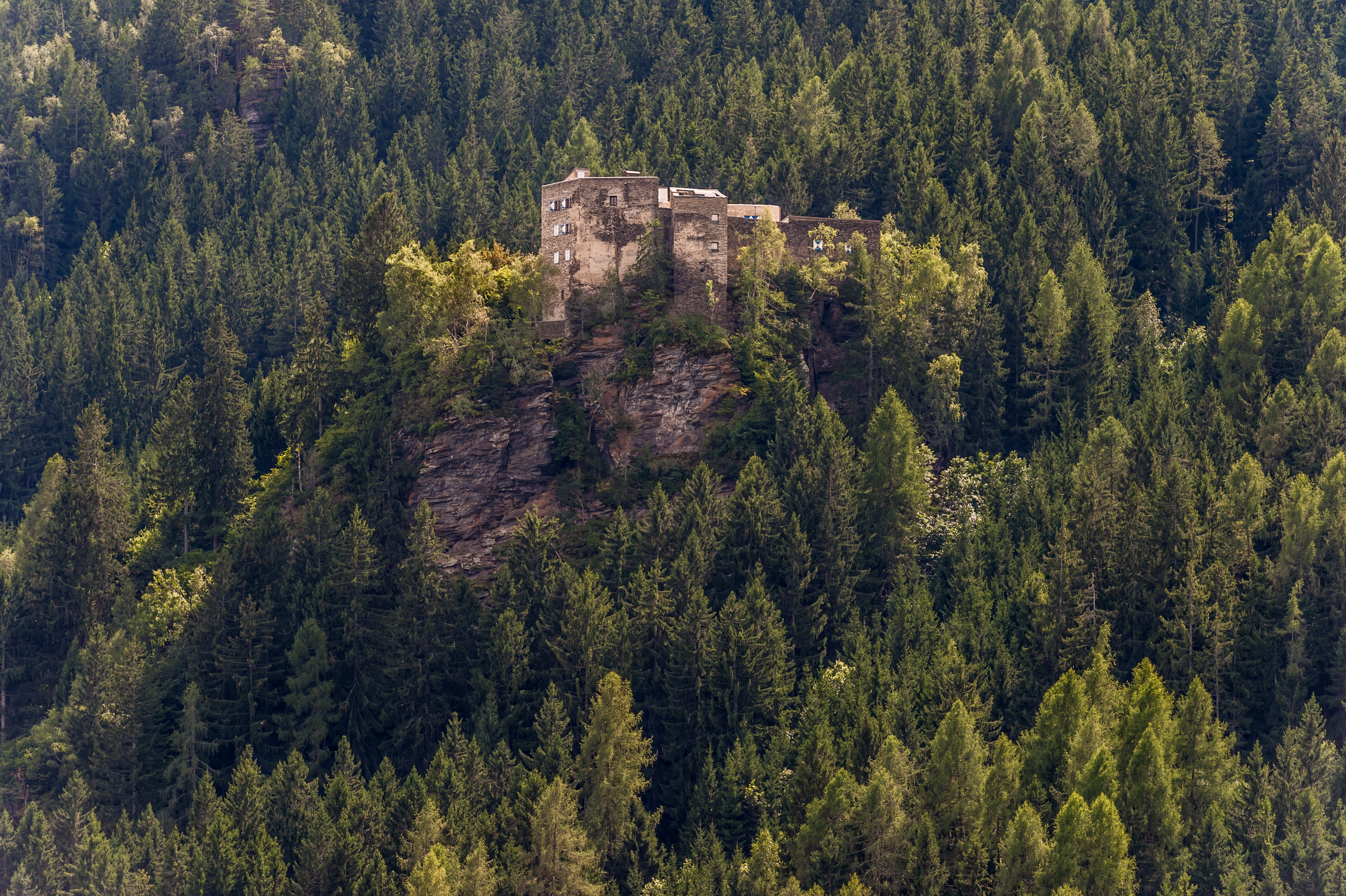

Site information
- Type: Hilltop castle

Location
- Coordinates: 46°46′48.4″N 14°18′49.3″E

Site history
- Built: early 12 century

Burgruine Nussberg is a castle in Frauenstein in Carinthia, Austria.

== See also ==
- List of castles in Austria
