= Galceran de Requesens i Joan de Soler =

Catalan noble and naval commander

Galceran de Requesens i Joan de Soler (1439 — Barcelona, 8 September 1505), First Count of Palamós (1486), of Trivento and Avellino (1456) and Baron of Calonge, was a Catalan noble and naval commander.

== Biography ==
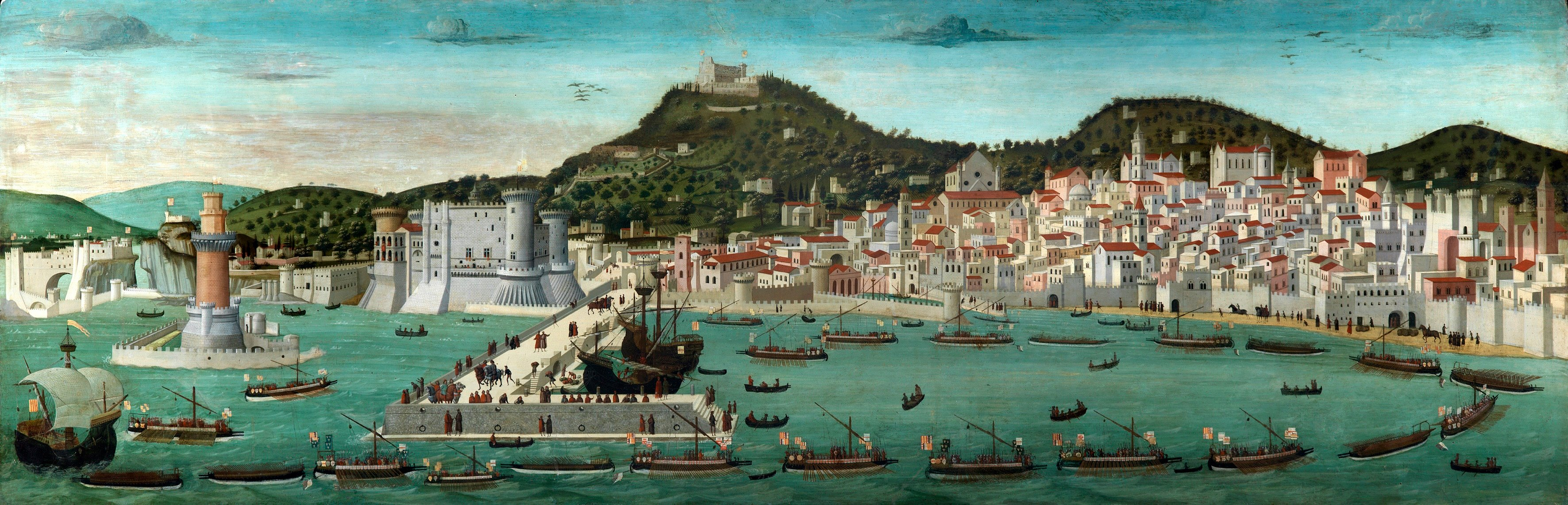
Tavola Strozzi : The Fleet of Galceran de Requesens returns to Naples after his victory at Ischia

He was the son of governor of Catalonia Galceran de Requesens i Santa Coloma and Elisabeta Joan de Soler.
He was in the service of King Ferdinand I of Naples as captain of his navy. In 1465, he managed with his navy to block the island of Ischia, where Joan de Torrelles i López de Gurrea, a supporter of René of Anjou and Count of Ischia, was in revolt, and to force him to capitulate after the Battle of Ischia.

In 1472, he became ambassador of the King of Naples in Barcelona. He acted as mediator between the King and Leonardo Alagon, who had started a rebellion in Sardinia, which led to a treaty on 12 July 1473 which confirmed Leonardo Alagon as Marquis of Oristano.

In 1480 he controlled the expedition where the young Bernat de Vilamarí conquered the port of Otranto from the Turks. In 1481 he again faced the Turks near the island of Sazan, opposite the city of Vlorë, on the current Albanian coast. On 4 November 1484, he signed an agreement with the Republic of Florence to fight the Genoese, which led to several military confrontations.

In 1484-86, he was Captain-general of the navy of King Ferdinand II of Catalonia-Aragon and participated in the Malaga campaign. In 1494 he had a pier built in Palamós.

In 1497, after French privateer ships attacked Venetian, Genoese and Catalan ships from Marseille , the councilors of Barcelona requested the King to have the royal squadron of Galceran de Requesens attack them. He actively intervened to recover the city of Naples from the hands of the French in the Italian Wars of 1499–1504, and transported the army of Gonzalo Fernández de Córdoba to Messina in his galleys. He died the next year in Barcelona.

=== Marriage and children ===
Galceran de Requesens married twice.
First to Elena del Balzo i Ursino, cousin of Queen consort of Naples Isabella del Balzo and daughter of Angilberto, Duke of Nardò. They had 2 daughters :

- Helena, married Pere Lluís d’Erill-Orcau-Anglesola;
- Joana, married Pere de Cardona i Enríquez (ca)

From his second marriage to Beatriz Enríquez, he had three daughters:

- Isabel de Requesens i Enríquez who succeeded her father in all his titles
- Joana de Requesens i Enríquez, married Pietro Antonio Sanseverino, prínce of Bisignano (it), and Petraccone Caracciolo Pisquizi, Duke of Martina
- Maria de Requesens i Enríquez who married Antonio Folc de Cardona y Enriquez, Viscount of Cardona.
