= Galceran de Requesens y Santa Coloma =

Spanish noble and politician (died 1465)

Galceran de Requesens y Santa Coloma (before 1426 - 1465), a Catalan nobleman, was an enemy of the Barcelona city council (an oligarchic power group then known as La Biga, comprising the nobility and major merchants of the city), and was Governor of Mallorca. He was a son of Luis de Requesens y Relat (d. 1426), baron of Altafulla and La Nou de Gaià, both rural lands located in the Spanish province of Tarragona.

He moved to the island of Menorca around 1439, because of disputes with the oligarchs of Catalonia since 1435, under King Alfonso V of Aragon.

In December 1439 the king invested him as a baron of Molins de Rei and the Barcelona area known as Santa Creu de Olorda. He opposed the oligarchs with a pressure group of merchants and artisans known as La Busca. Forbidden to meet in the town of Barcelona, the Busca met outside the town, in Sabadell, Terrassa, Vilafranca del Penedès and Montcada.

Acting as a royal agent, Lieutenant General of Catalonia, in November 1453 he suppressed the Barcelona Council. He had to go to clear these disputes and actions with King Alfonso V of Aragon, mainly residing near Naples, Italy since 1423, his estranged Spanish wife being till then a sort of royal representative of her husband king Alfonso, or governor of Catalonia, together with Alfonso's troublesome and restless brother, John, former prince consort of Navarre, later King John II of Aragon and the father of the later King Ferdinand II of Aragon and of the Navarrese inheritor of the kingdom, Prince Charles of Viana. In 1456 Alfonso V of Aragon, a.k.a. Alfonso I of Naples, awarded him feudal rights to the Italian towns of Trivento and Avellino.

Before dying in 1458, Alfonso granted the status of nobility to Galceran and to his brother Bernat de Requesens y de Santa Coloma, but the "Biga" group they represented disputed John II's succession to his brother Alfonso, claiming new and old laws implemented along the Catalan counties' history. The "Biga" had supported the unfortunate Prince Charles of Viana, half-brother of the later king Ferdinand II, as a candidate to inherit the Navarrese throne. John II also claimed the Navarrese throne, something unacceptable to the Navarrese, as his having been prince consort of Navarre did not confer the right to succession.

The defeat in 1461 of Charles, fighting against his father John, legal king of Aragon since 1458 on the death of his brother Alfonso V, led to the so-called capitulation of Vilafranca del Penedès and Charles's imprisonment by John, as well as to his premature death under suspicious circumstances.

Galceran and his wife Elisabeta Joan de Soler, from Valencia, had 13 children, including Galceran de Requesens, 1st Count of Palamós, many of them entrepreneurs, international merchants and members of the Aragonese nobility settled there. Galceran de Requesens was eventually made destitute and went to prison for 108 days before being exiled to Valencia, where he died in 1465.
