= Burgruine Dietrichstein =

Castle in Austria

Coordinates: 46°43′34″N 14°07′45″E

- Carinthia, Austria
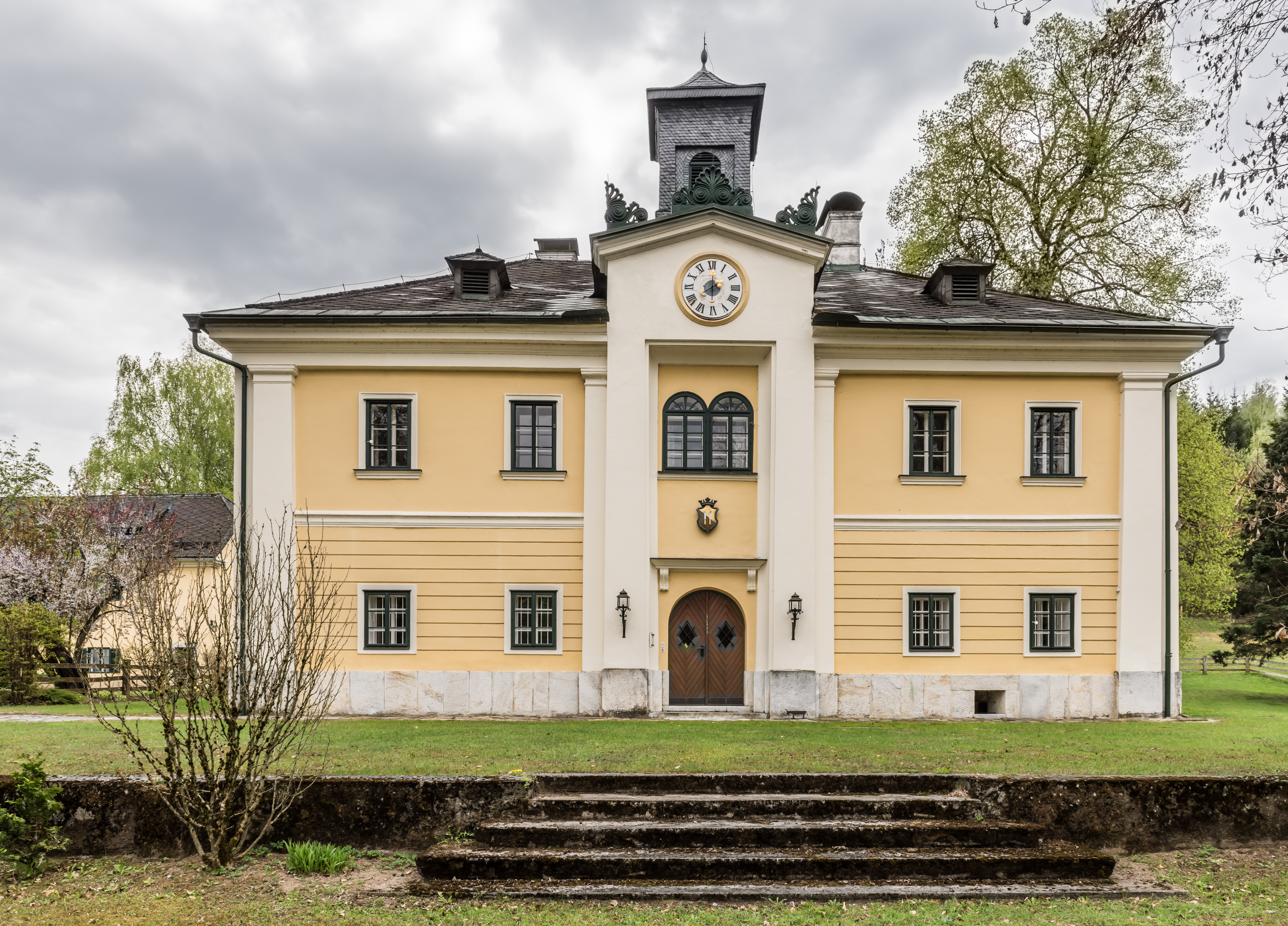

Site information
- Type: Castle

Burgruine Dietrichstein is a castle in Carinthia, Austria.

== See also ==
- List of castles in Austria
