= Folch de Cardona =

Spanish noble family of Catalan origin

- Parent family: Angiò
- Place of origin: Catalonia
- Titles: Viscount, Count and Duke of Cardona; Baron of Entença; Baron of Bellpuig; Count of Empordà; Count of Golisano; Count of Prades; Duke of Segorbe; Duke of Soma; Marquis of Comares; Marquis of Guadalest; Marquis of Pallars; Lord of Espejo and Lucena; Lord of Chillón; Lord of Guadalest; Lord of Mazara del Vallo; Viscount of Villamur

The House of Folch de Cardona (or Cardona or Incardona in Sicily) was an old and important Spanish noble family of Catalan origin. They were second only in importance to the royal family of Aragon.

== History ==
The family legend says that they directly descended from the French royal family, but the real genealogical connection was never proved. Members of the family were Dukes of Cardona, Grandees of Spain, and Viceroys of Catalonia, Sicily, Sardinia, Naples, and New Granada. They also have four cardinals, many bishops, and one blessed.
