= Moravské zemské muzeum =

Museum in Brno, Czech Republic

Moravian Museum
- Moravské zemské muzeum

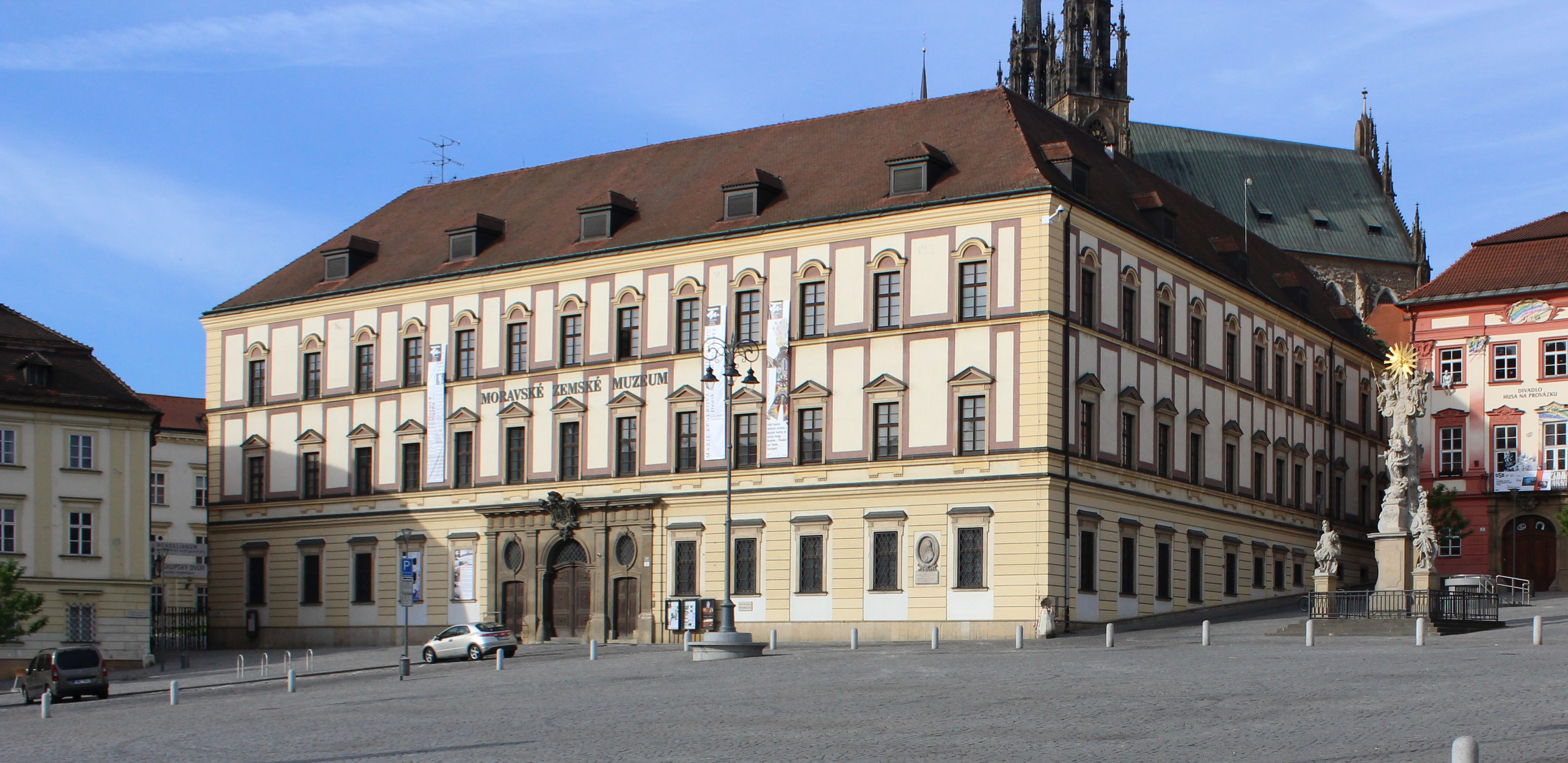
- Dietrichstein Palace, seat of the museum
- Established: July 1817
- Location: Brno, Czech Republic
- Coordinates: 49°11′29″N 16°36′30″E
- Website: www.mzm.cz/en/

Moravské zemské muzeum (English: Moravian Museum) is a museum in Brno in the Czech Republic. It is the second-largest and second-oldest museum in the country. Its collections include several million objects from many fields of science and culture.

== Location ==
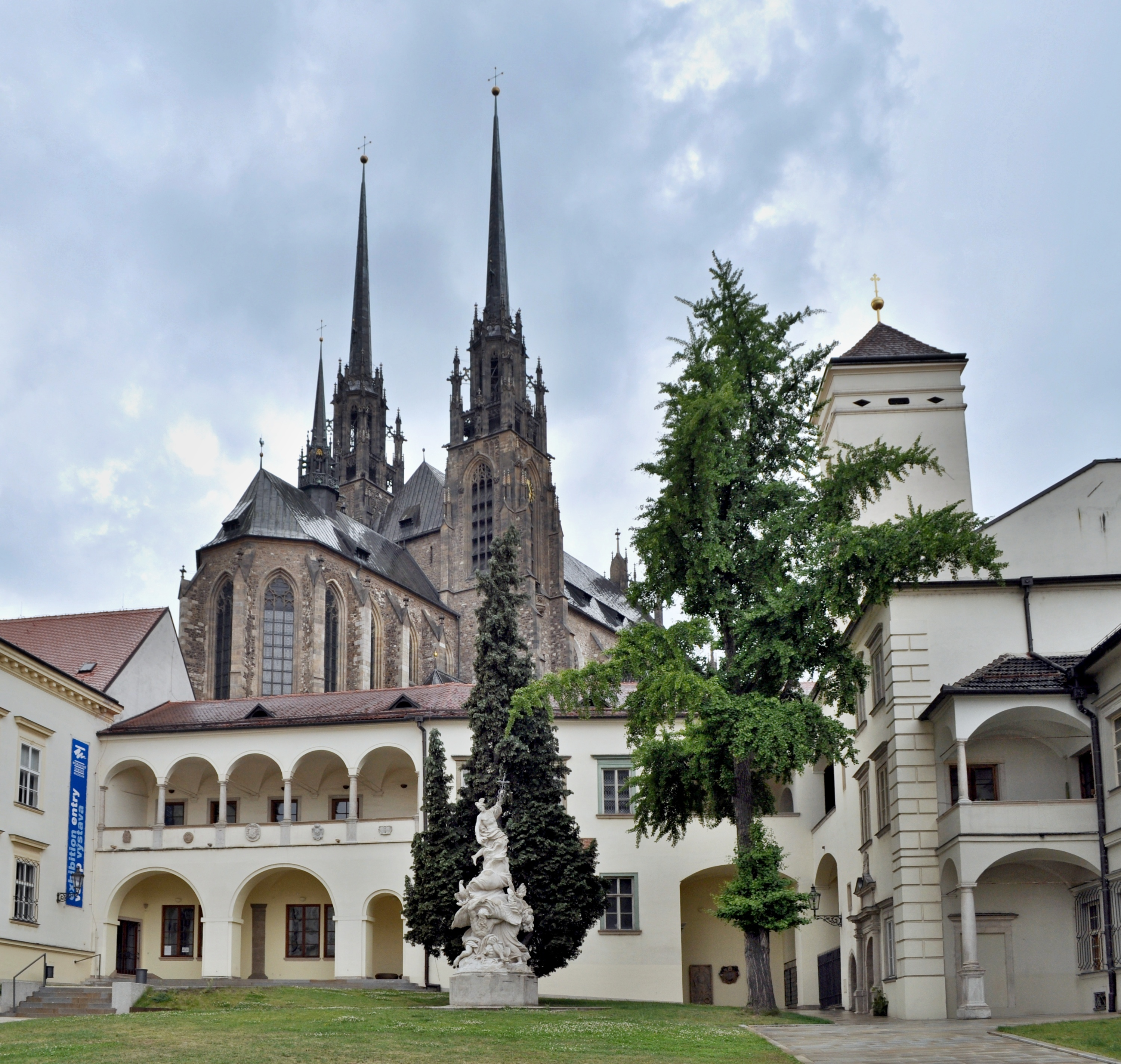
Bishop's Courtyard

The museum's seat is located in Dietrichstein Palace in Zelný trh in the historic centre of Brno. It was built as a residence of Cardinal Franz von Dietrichstein in 1613–1616. It was rebuilt in late Baroque style at the turn of the 17th and 18th centuries and become one of the largest Baroque buildings in Brno.

== History ==
The Moravian Museum was founded in July 1817 by a decree of Emperor Francis II. Science figures such as Christian Carl André, Count Josef Auersperg, Count Hugo-František Salm-Reifferscheid, or Antonín Bedřich Mitrovský were involved in the establishment of the museum.

=== Beethoven score manuscript ===
Following the Nazi invasion of Czechoslovakia, the Petschek family, a wealthy Czech Jewish family involved in banking and the mining industry, fled to the US. They attempted to send by post a prized family possession, the original score of the fourth movement of Beethoven's String Quartet No. 13. However, it was intercepted by the Gestapo. The Nazis asked an expert from the Moravian Museum to verify the authenticity of the score. The expert recognized Beethoven's handwriting, but in order to save the manuscript from being looted he lied to the Nazis and said it was not authentic. The Museum was then allowed to keep it. It remained with the Moravian Museum for more than 80 years.

The Nazis seized most of the Petschek family's assets and possessions, which Czechoslovakia's Communist regime nationalized after the war. Franz Petschek, who had run the family's mining businesses in Czechoslovakia, tried from his new home in the US to get the piece back but got scant sympathy from the Communist government.

In August 2022, the Moravian Museum di take the decision to return the manuscript to the heirs of the Petschek family, adhering to the Terezin Declaration which urged governments to make every effort to return former Jewish properties confiscated by the Nazis, fascists and their collaborators to their original owners. Before returning the Beethoven score, the museum exhibited it for five days. It had not been exhibited earlier during the museum's prolonged custody of it. The museum considered it one of the most precious items in its collections.

== Exhibitions ==
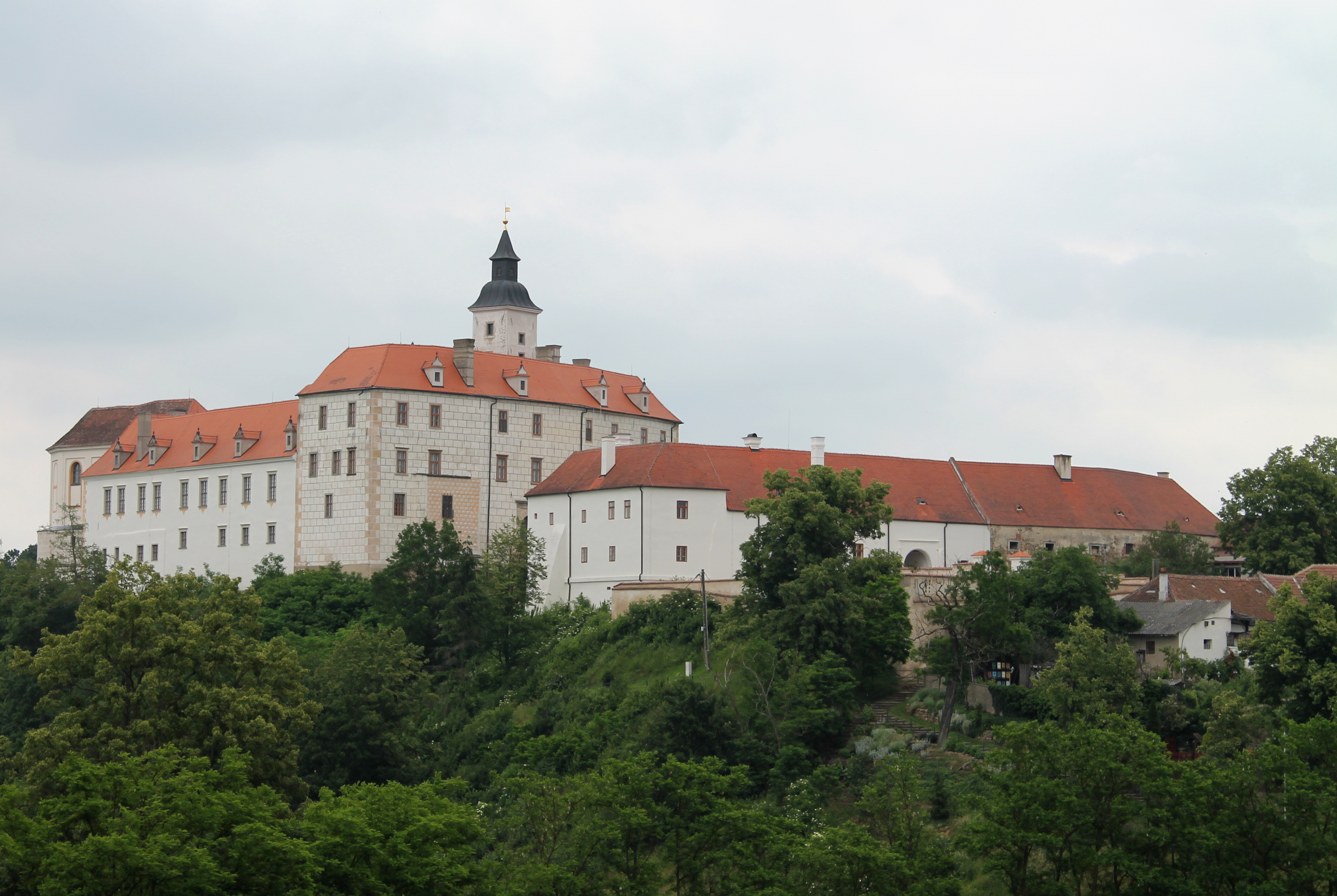
Old Jevišovice Castle

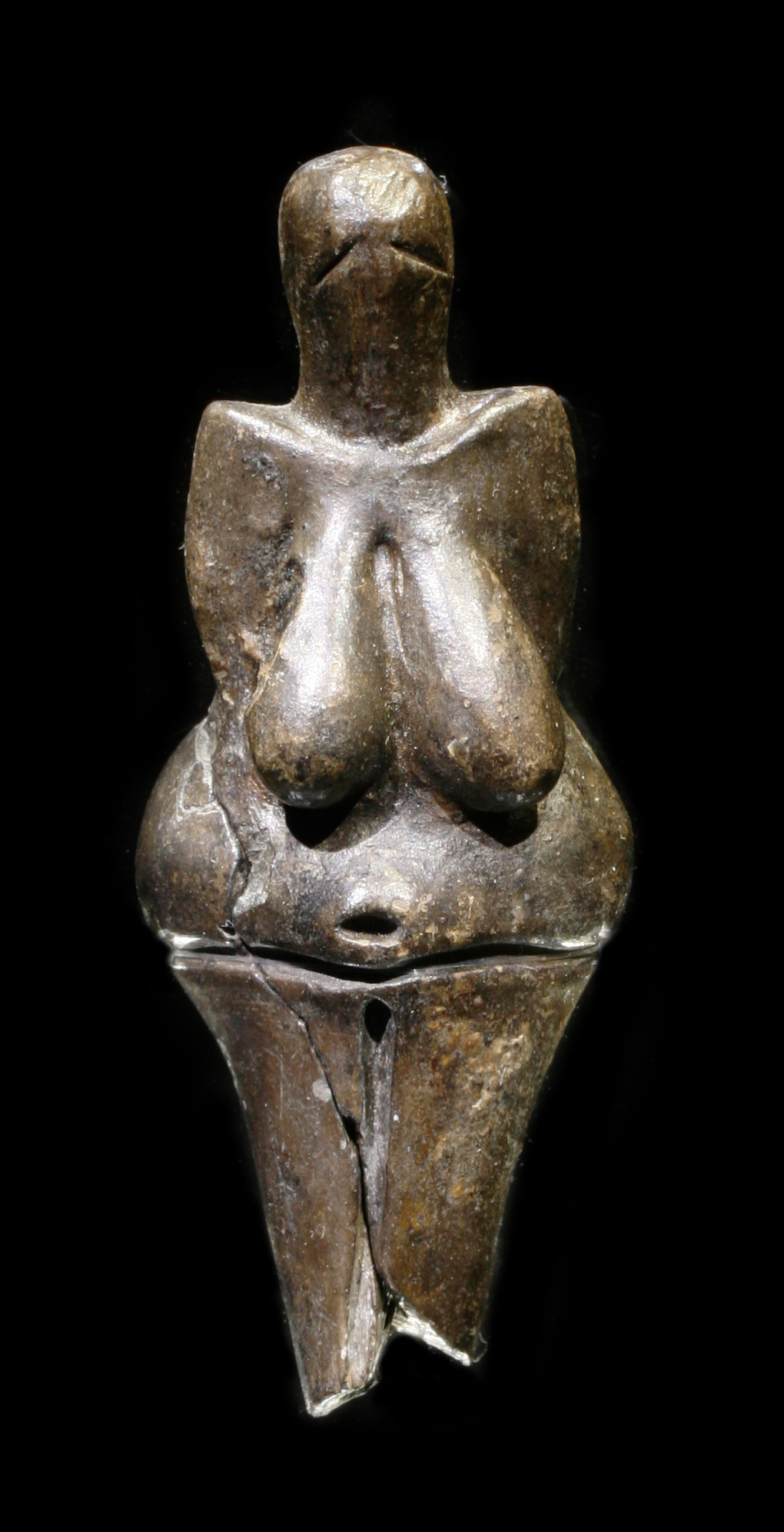
Venus of Dolní Věstonice, the most famous exhibit of the museum

The museum has several exhibition spaces in Brno:

- Dietrichstein Palace
- Bishop's Courtyard
- Mendelianum
- Palace of Noble Ladies
- Anthropos Pavilion (created by Karel Absolon)
- Mushroom Gatherers' Consultation Place
- Leoš Janáček Memorial
- Jiří Gruša House

The museum also owns and manages several monuments outside Brno:

- Old Jevišovice Castle in Jevišovice
- Budišov Castle in Budišov
- Moravec Castle in Moravec
- Memorial of Kralice Bible in Kralice nad Oslavou
- Centre for Slavonic Archaeology in Uherské Hradiště
