= Frans van Stampart =

Flemish portrait painter, printmaker and publisher (1675–1750)

- Born: 12 June 1675, Antwerp
- Died: 3 April 1750 (aged 74), Vienna
- Known for: Portrait painting, printmaking, publishing

Frans van Stampart (born in Antwerp 12 June 1675 – died 3 April 1750 in Vienna) was a Flemish portrait painter, printmaker and publisher. The artist established a reputation as a portraitist of European rulers, aristocrats and higher clergy. He had an international career, which brought him to the court in Vienna where he worked as court painter of the Imperial court. He is also known as the co-publisher of two publications which depict the Imperial art collection in Vienna and for which he also made some of the engravings.

== Life ==
Frans van Stampart was baptized in the St James Church in Antwerp on 16 January 1675. He was a pupil of the relative obscure Gislein van der Sijpen (or Gielein Peeter van der Sypen) with whom he started his training in 1689.

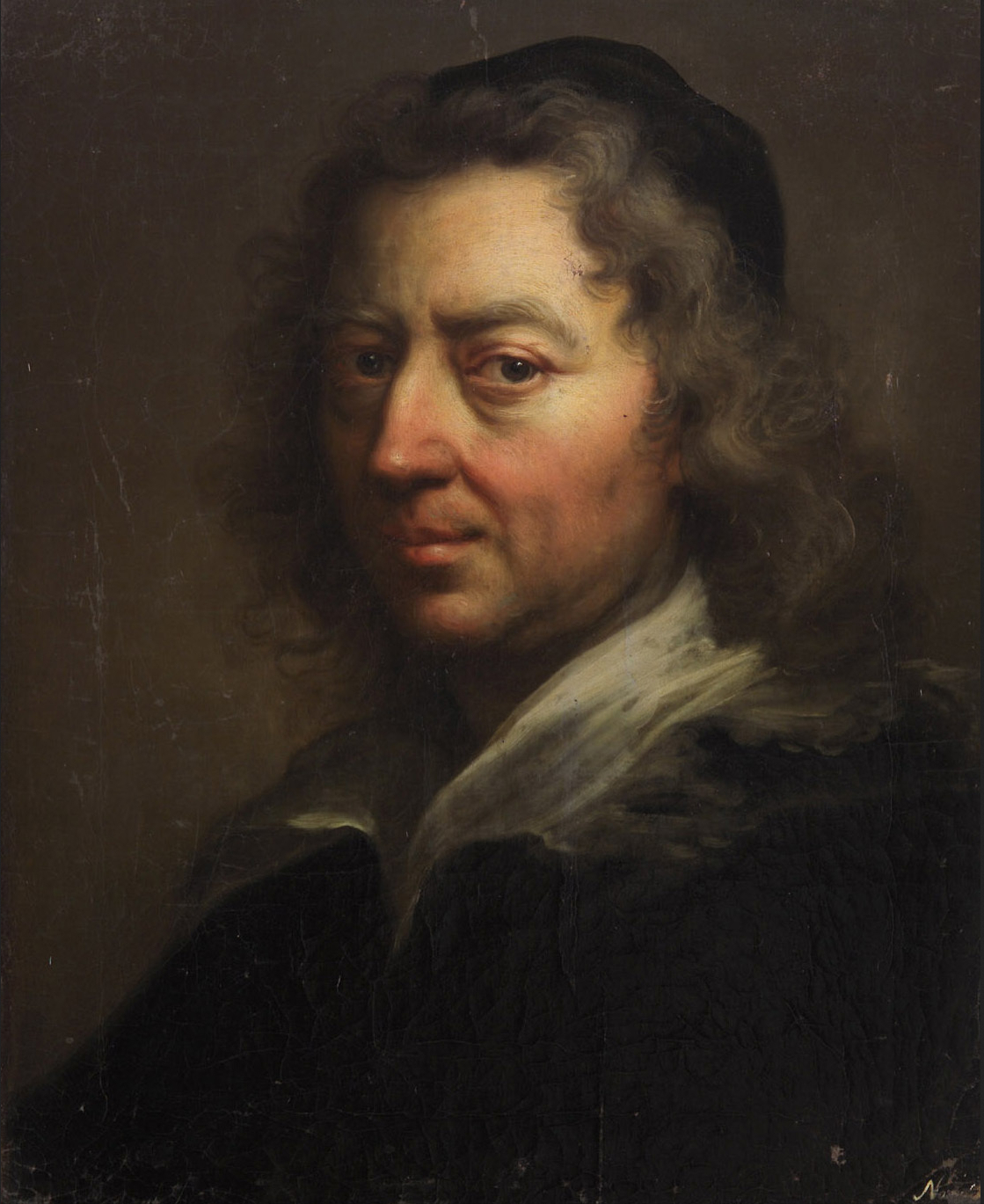
Portrait of a man

He became master of the Antwerp Guild of Saint Luke in the guild year 1693-94 and remained active in Antwerp for five more years. He painted portraits in the style of fellow Antwerp artist Pieter Thijs, a leading portrait painter in the Southern Netherlands. These appear to have pleased Emperor Leopold I who called him to Vienna and appointed him his court painter in 1698. In this role he painted portraits of the Emperor, his consort and the princes of the realm.

After the Emperor's death, he retained his court appointment under the successive emperors Joseph I and Charles VI and to Empress Maria Theresa. He also portrayed many Austrian and German nobles. Van Stampart was active as an engraver and collaborated with court painter and engraver Anton Joseph von Prenner on a volume of prints entitled Theatrum artis pictoriae (1728–1733). The two artists collaborated again in 1735 on another volume of prints entitled Prodromus, which depicts the Imperial art collection in prints.

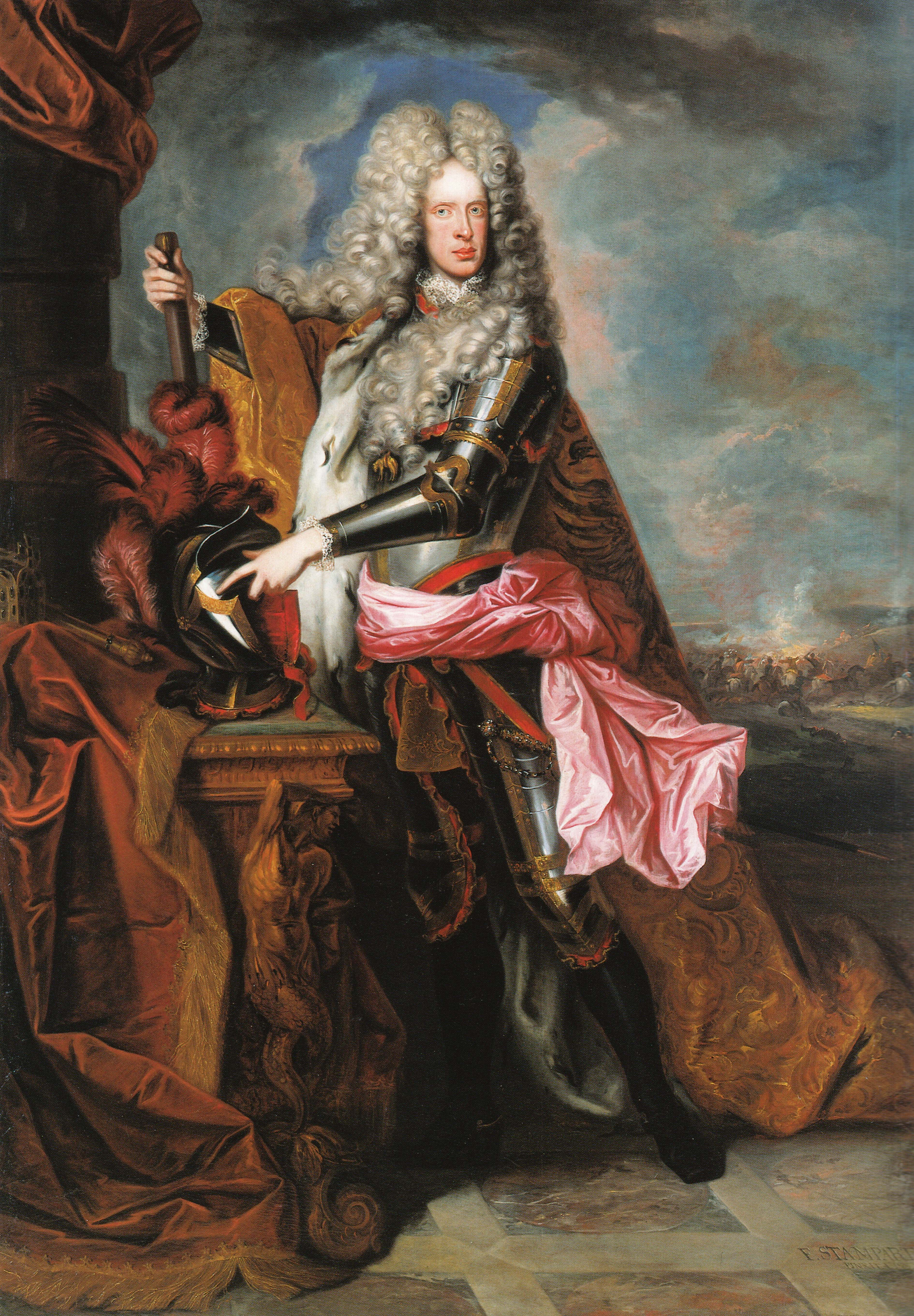
Emperor Joseph I with armor and general's staff in front of a battle scene

He remained active in Vienna where he died in 1750.

== Work ==
=== Portrait painter ===
Frans van Stampart was known mainly as a portrait painter to the elite. His sitters were members of the Imperial family in Vienna and other royal families, German, Austrian and English nobles and higher clergy. His style was initially close to that of Pieter Thijs. His work can be found in museums in the Royal Museums of Fine Arts of Belgium, Brussels, Kunsthistorisches Museum, Musée des Beaux-Arts d'Orléans as well as in German and Austrian castles including in Drosendorf, Greillenstein, Pommersfelden and Schloss Rastatt.

=== Publisher of the Imperial art collection ===
Frans van Stampart and Anton Joseph von Prenner started collaborating on a publication project that was entitled Theatrum artis pictoriae. The publication was likely inspired by the new display of the Imperial art collection in the Stallburg gallery. The plan was to publish 30 volumes of prints representing the entire Imperial art collection in Stallburg. Only four volumes were printed between 1728 and 1733. Each of the four volumes contains 40 full page copper engravings depicting the paintings in the Stallburg gallery in a laterally inverted way. The first two plates of volume I offer plans of the galleries with views of six rooms. The rendering of the paintings is not always very detailed and sometimes parts of paintings are distorted in the prints. According to which criteria the selection of the paintings was made is not clear and the publication does not offer any art historical explanation. The important achievement of von Prenner and van Stampart was to be the first to include in a publication works from the old German school.

Due to the difficult preparatory work and prolonged publication history of the Theatrum, von Prenner and van Stampart published the Prodromus (full title: Prodromus, seu Praeambulare lumen reserati portentosae magnificentiae theatri, quo omnia ad aulam caesaream in Augustissimae suae caesareae) in Vienna in 1735. It was intended to give a preview of the volumes of the Theatrum that had yet to appear ('prodromus' means a preliminary publication or introductory work). The Prodromus offers an overview of the works already published in the Theatrum and a preview of what the next volumes would offer. It reprises the plans of the galleries with views of six rooms of the Theatrum. These are followed by plates showing the walls of the galleries, completely covered by framed paintings. Each of the 24 plates reproduce 960 paintings by 230 painters with fast strokes. Four pages show 228 sculptures, reliefs, gems and medals in the collection. One of the important improvements in the Prodromus in comparison to the Theatrum is that the paintings are rendered not in mirror view starting from plate 8. This publication enjoyed support in high places as is shown by the fact that prominent aristocrats engraved some of the plates: Count Leopold Windischgraetz (plate 9), the counts Anton and Johann Nepomuk Csáky (plates 11 and 13) and Maria Barbara Lemperg (plate 12).

== Gallery ==
Selected prints from the Prodromus

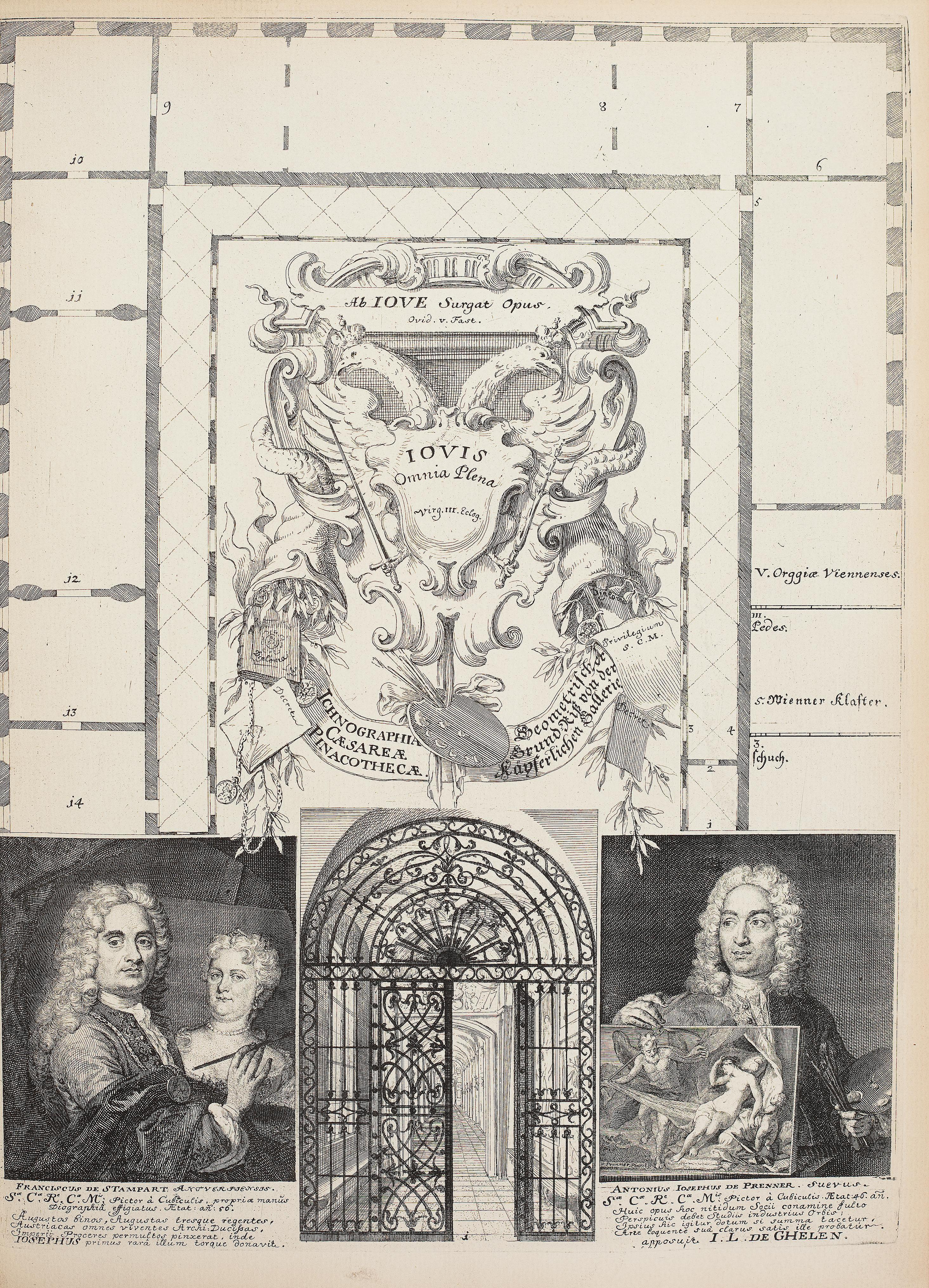
Plan of the Stallburg collection with portraits of Frans van Stampart (on left) and Anton Joseph von Prenner (on right)

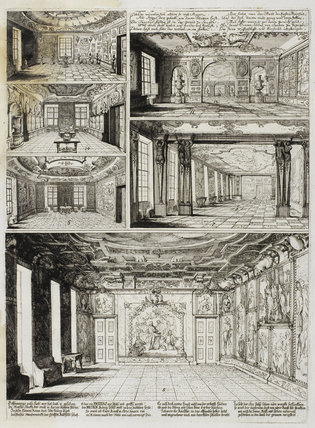
Prodromus: View of the galleries

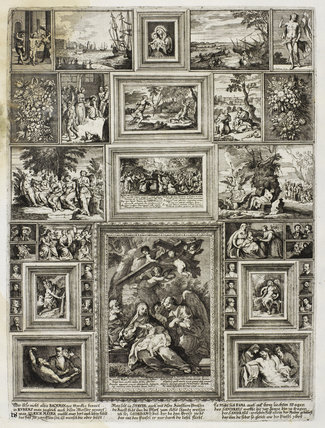
Prodromus: Plate 18
