= Joseph Melling =

French painter

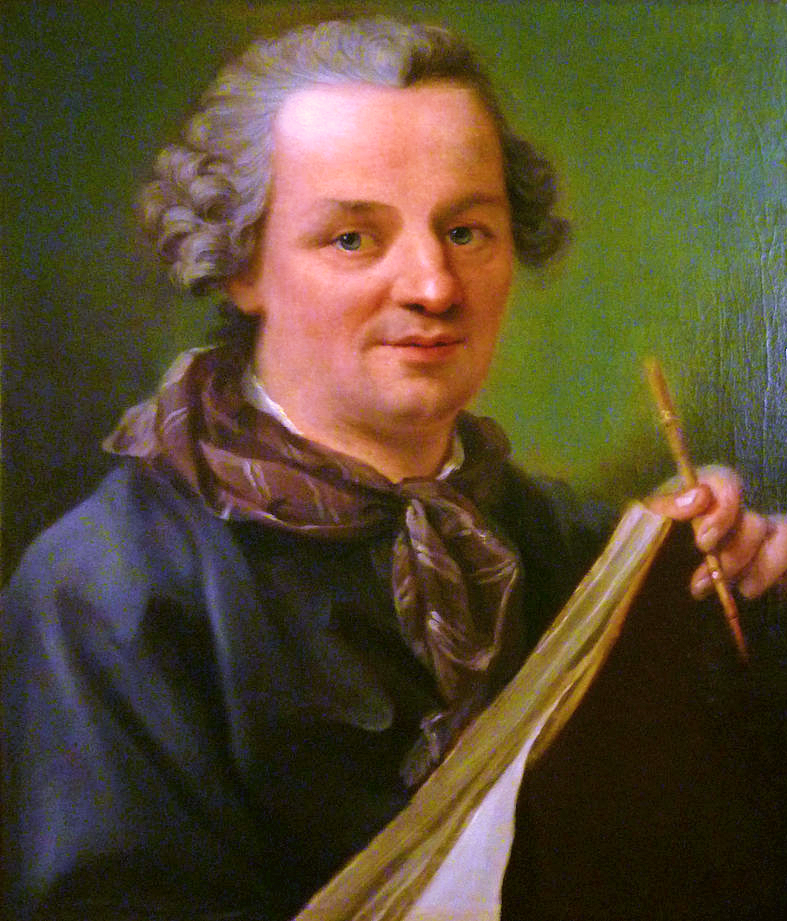
Self-portrait (date unknown)

Joseph Melling (27 December 1724 – 23 December 1796) was an Alsatian artist who served as court painter for the Margraviate of Baden at Karlsruhe Palace.

== Biography ==
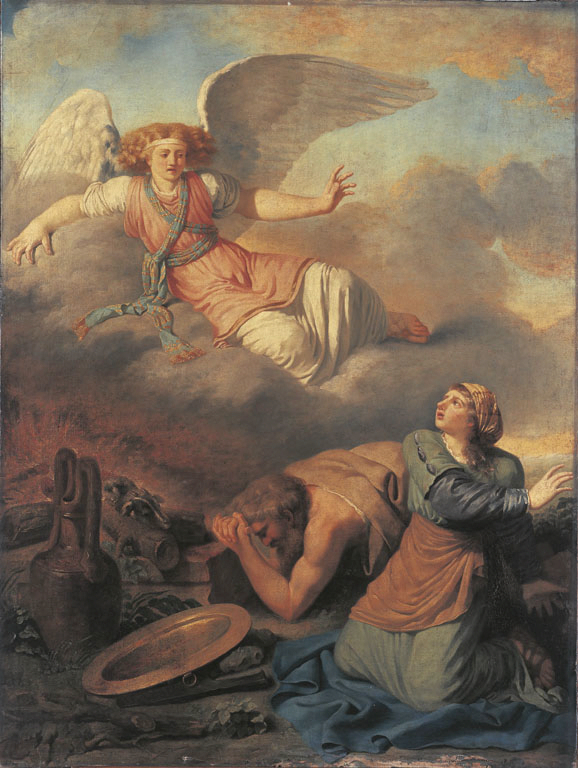
Laban Giving his Daughter to Jacob (1750)

He came from a long-established line of painters, etchers, architects and woodcarvers. He was born in Saint-Avold, where his father had come to participate in the rebuilding of a monastery and its church. He attended the Lateinschule in Saarlouis and went to Paris to complete an apprenticeship in carpentry. After that, he studied with Carle van Loo and François Boucher. In 1750, he was awarded the Prix de Rome in painting for his version of Laban giving his daughter to Jacob. It is not clear if he went to Rome, but it is probable that he did some church painting with his uncle Valentin Metzinger in Laibach (Ljubljana).

In 1758, he joined his brother, the sculptor Christoph Melling (1716–1778), as a court painter in Karlsruhe. The following year, he married Josepha Lengelacher, the daughter of his brother's supervisor, the sculptor Ignaz Lengelacher. In 1760, he completed a ceiling painting in the large marble hall of the Palace and, in 1764, decorated the altar at the Stadtkirche in Rastatt. He also served as an advisor to Countess Karoline Luise, helping her to acquire an art collection that later became the basis of the Staatliche Kunsthalle Karlsruhe.

In later years, he travelled throughout the area. In 1769, he painted a ceiling fresco and altarpieces for the monastery church in Schuttern. The same year, he did decorations at the Capuchin monastery in Baden-Baden. The year 1770 found him in Hechingen, creating altarpieces for the Stiftskirche. Two years later, he was in Freiburg doing a large mural for the Grand Ducal Palace.

For many years, he operated a drawing school in what was once the palace's menagerie. His daughter Marie Luise (1762–1799) was one of his first students. Later, she took the name "Maria Rosa" and entered Lichtenthal Abbey, where she helped him paint murals in the meeting hall.

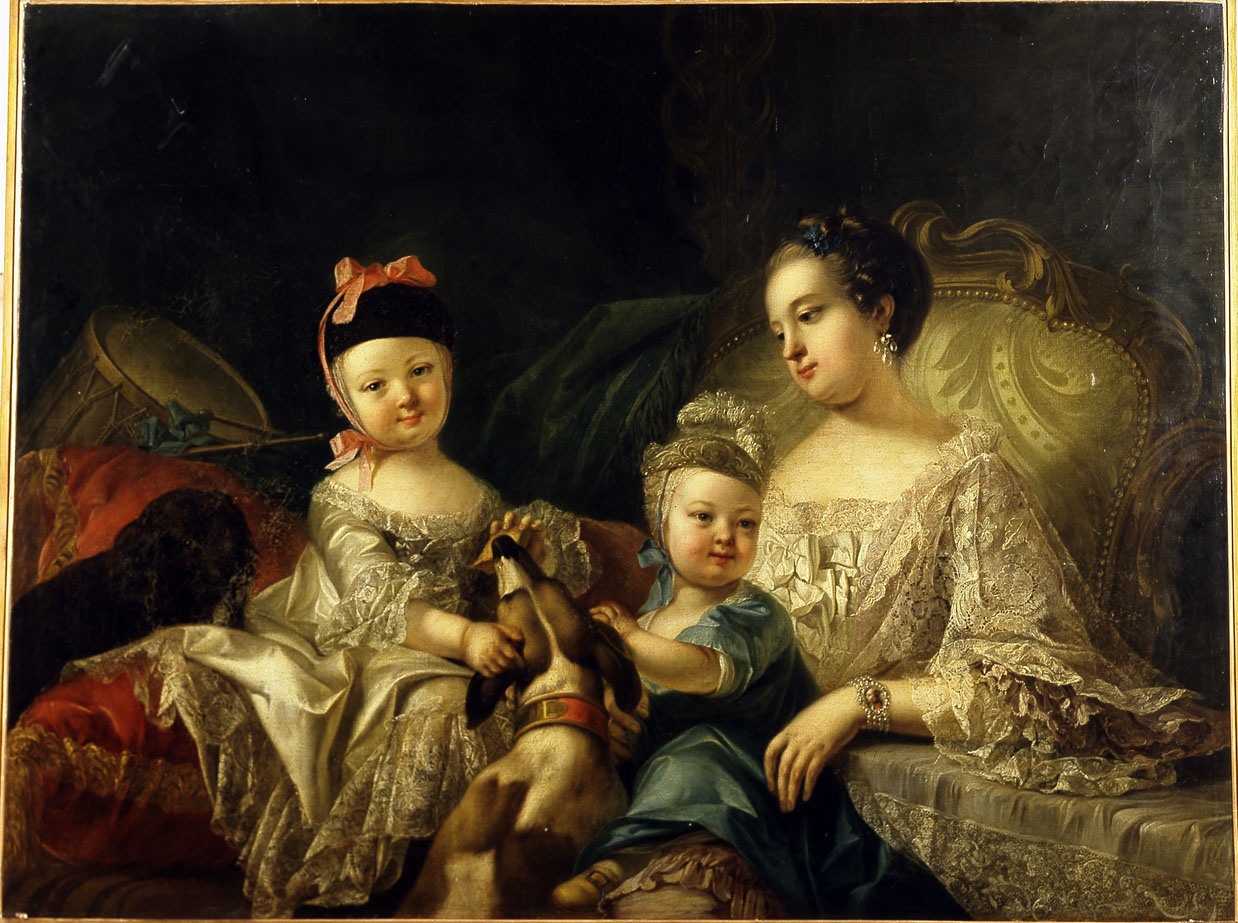
Karoline Luise and her sons; Karl Ludwig and Friedrich (1757)

In 1774, for financial reasons, he left Karlsruhe for Strasbourg, where he founded an art school; the "Academie de déssin d’après nature". He retained his contacts with the court, however and, after the death of Karoline Luise in 1783, created a catalog and directory of her collection.

In 1789, during the French Revolution, his school was superseded by a system of centrally-controlled state schools. Six years later, he was able to open a private school, supported by his son, the painter Joseph Ignaz Melling (1764–1817), who later operated his own art school in Rastatt.

Melling died on 23 December 1796 in Strasbourg.
