= John Lewin =

English-born artist

John William Lewin (1770 – 27 August 1819) was an English-born artist active in Australia from 1800. The first professional artist of the colony of New South Wales, he illustrated the earliest volumes of Australian natural history. Many of his illustrations were of native Australian birds on native Australian plants.

== Early life ==
Lewin was the son of a professional scientific artist, William Lewin, who was the author of an eight-volume work The Birds of Great Britain (1789–94). William Lewin's two sons, John William and Thomas, worked with him preparing work. William acknowledges their work in the preface to his book. Around 1797, John Lewin was keen to visit New South Wales.

== To New South Wales ==
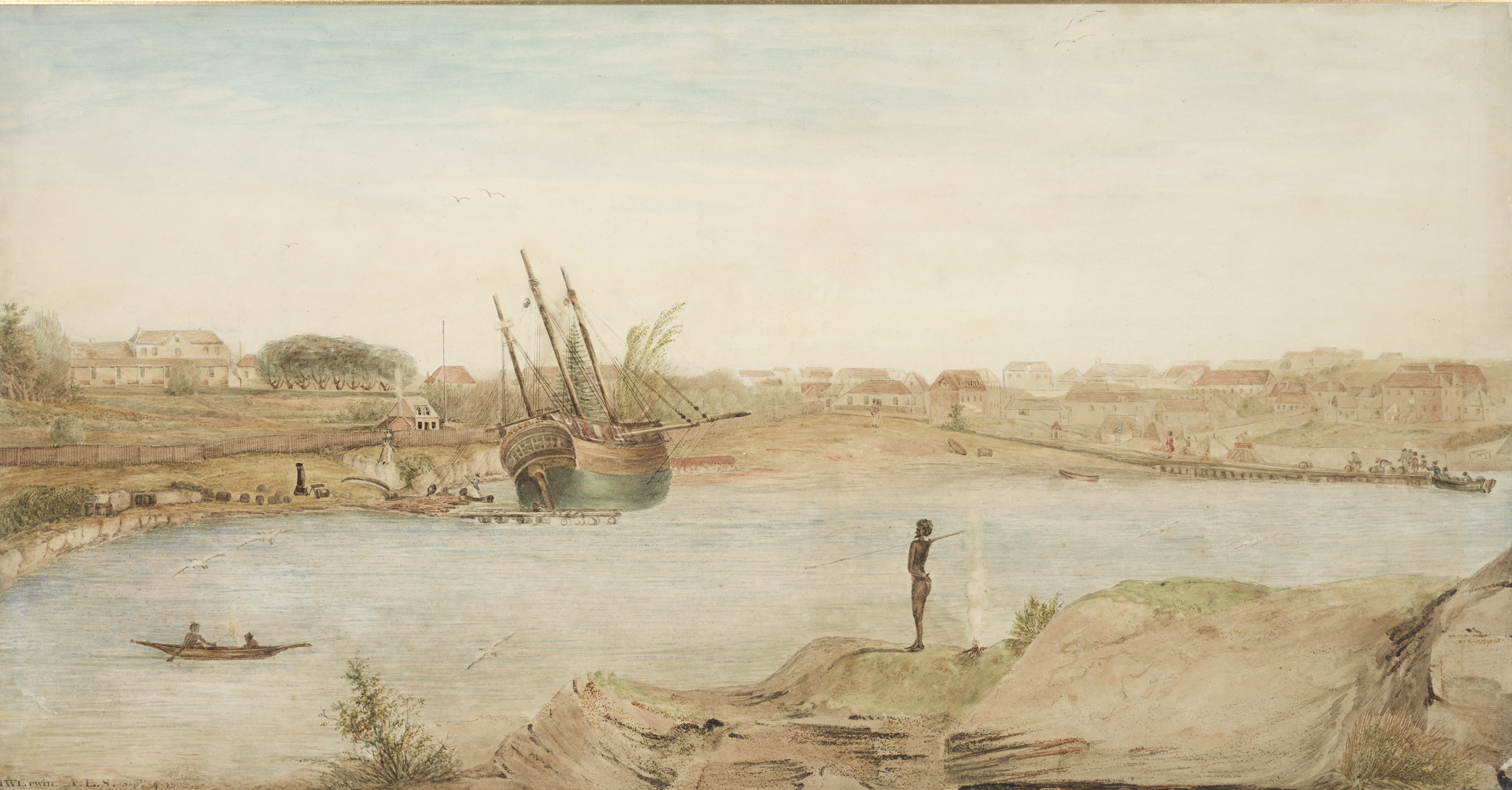
Sydney cove 1808

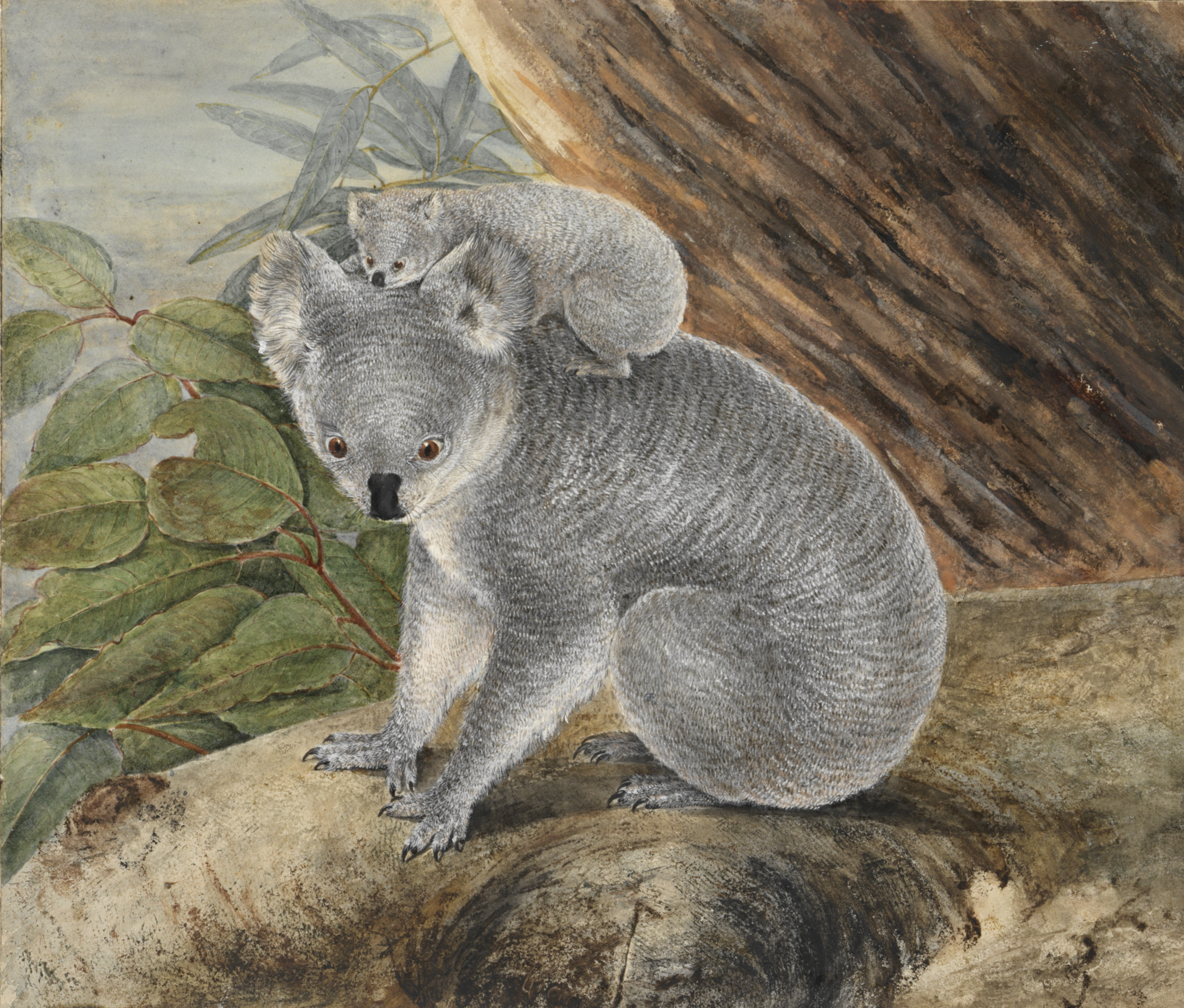
Koala and young, 1803, by John William Lewin

John Lewin planned to travel on HMS Buffalo for New South Wales in 1798 to record ornithological and entomological life for a British patron, Dru Drury. Somehow he missed this voyage but his wife travelled on it and arrived 3 May 1799. Lewin did travel on the Minerva, arriving 11 January 1800, becoming the first resident professional artist in the colony. The resulting books were intended to fund his passage home, but the fashion for Australian natural wonders was already fading by the time he published Prodromus Entomology, Natural History of Lepidopterous Insects of New South Wales, in 1805. Only six copies of his next book, Birds of New Holland with their Natural History, published in 1808 in London, have survived, which suggests that the remaining copies were somehow lost. An 1813 edition of the latter, made up from cast-off prints and pulls, was the first illustrated book to be engraved and printed in Australia. Birds of New South Wales, of which thirteen copies have survived, is considered one of the great Australian bibliographic rarities. Lewin's own, very basic, text was printed by the Government Printer George Howe.

Lewin and his wife Maria Ann were granted a small farm near Parramatta, but by 1808 they were living in Sydney where the artist advertised his services as a portrait miniaturist. Governors Philip Gidley King and William Bligh were early patrons. Governor Macquarie, recognising the usefulness of a professional artist to his schemes for the colony, and to guarantee him an income, appointed him city coroner in 1810, and included him in the 1815 official inspection party of new lands discovered beyond the Blue Mountains. Lewin's watercolours of this expedition are now held by the State Library of New South Wales. Macquarie also commissioned illustrations of plants collected by the surveyor-general, John Oxley, in his explorations of the country beyond Bathurst, the Liverpool Plains and New England.

Lewin died in Sydney on 27 August 1819 leaving a widow and a son. His tombstone can be found at Botany Bay Cemetery. He is commemorated in the names of two birds, Lewin's rail (Lewinia pectoralis) and Lewin's honeyeater (Meliphaga lewinii), and probably a butterfly, Lewin's euploea (Euploea lewinii).

== Legacy ==
His background as a natural history artist made Lewin an acute observer of the reality of the Australian landscape and its fauna and flora: critic Robert Hughes comments that he was the first to record the distinct "look" of Australia without being blinded by European art conventions, and according to art historian Bernard Smith, "Lewin grasped the nature of the eucalyptus, its light translucent foliage through which the horizon may be seen, and the nature of the slender and feathery grasses of the interior. He succeeded, too, in portraying an authentic bush atmosphere."

Walter Wilson Froggatt stated in his memoir of Lewin: "he collected the insects in all stages of development, studied their life histories, noted their food plants, and made accurate coloured drawings from the living insects".

Although Lewin was made an Associate of the Linnean Society, he was not part of the scientific milieu which surround significant naturalists such as Robert Brown, Sir Joseph Banks, or Alan Cunningham. Rather his training was that of a practical collector and artisan. He found it difficult to write about science – indeed his own text for Birds of New South Wales is naive and simple. Rather he excelled as an observer, and although never a great natural history artist, brought to his own work a keen sense of observation and design. Indeed, his interaction with Australian flora and fauna sharpened his eye and art: he moved from producing very conventional natural history illustrations in England to strongly composed images set in local context in Australia. While he did not succeed as a publisher or printmaker, his large-scale natural history watercolours of exotic Australian plants and animals appear to have found a steady market. He also seems to have had ambitions to be considered a professional artist, as opposed to simply an illustrator: he noted in 1812 that he had painted a 15 x 18 foot image of a corroboree. Lewin appears to have permanently settled in Australia, where he was one of the few professional artists, a fact from which he gained socially and professionally.

== Gallery ==
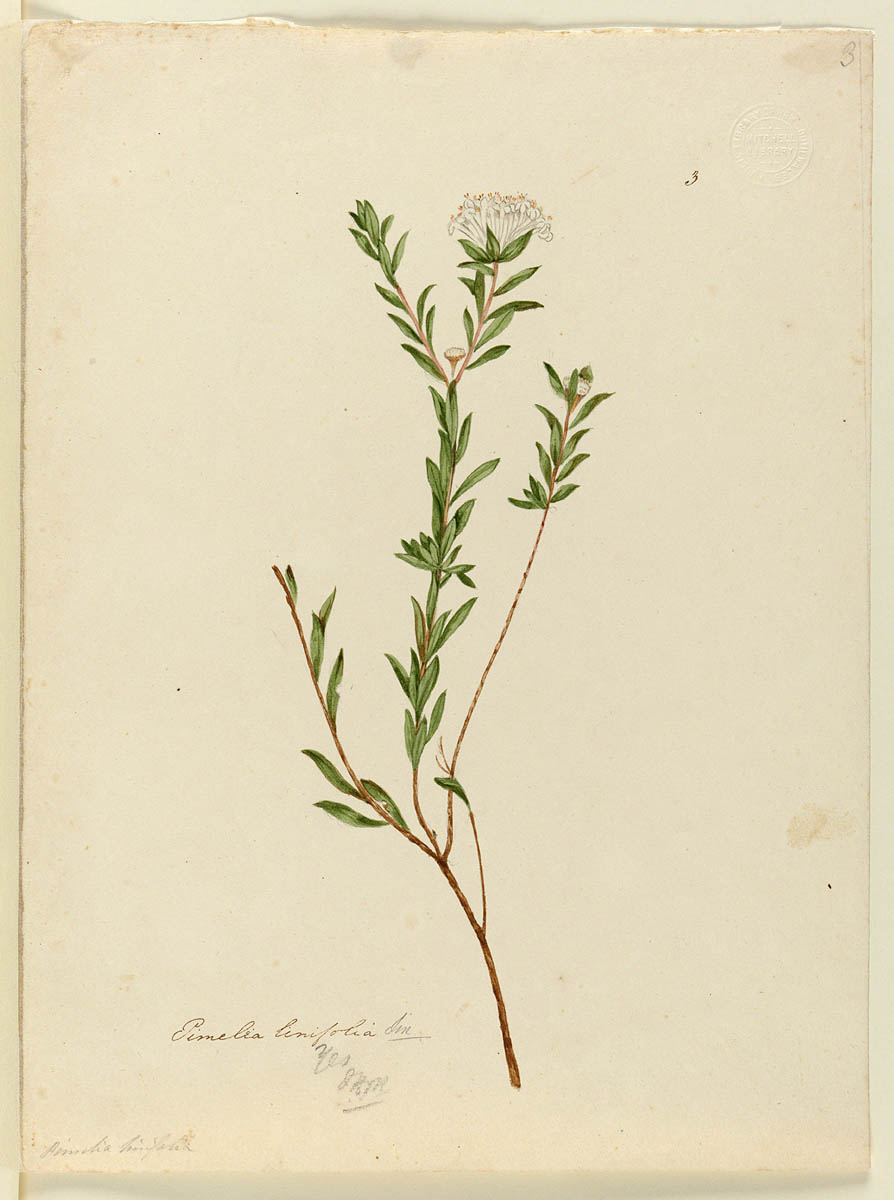
Pimelea linifolia from a botanical series in watercolour by the artist.

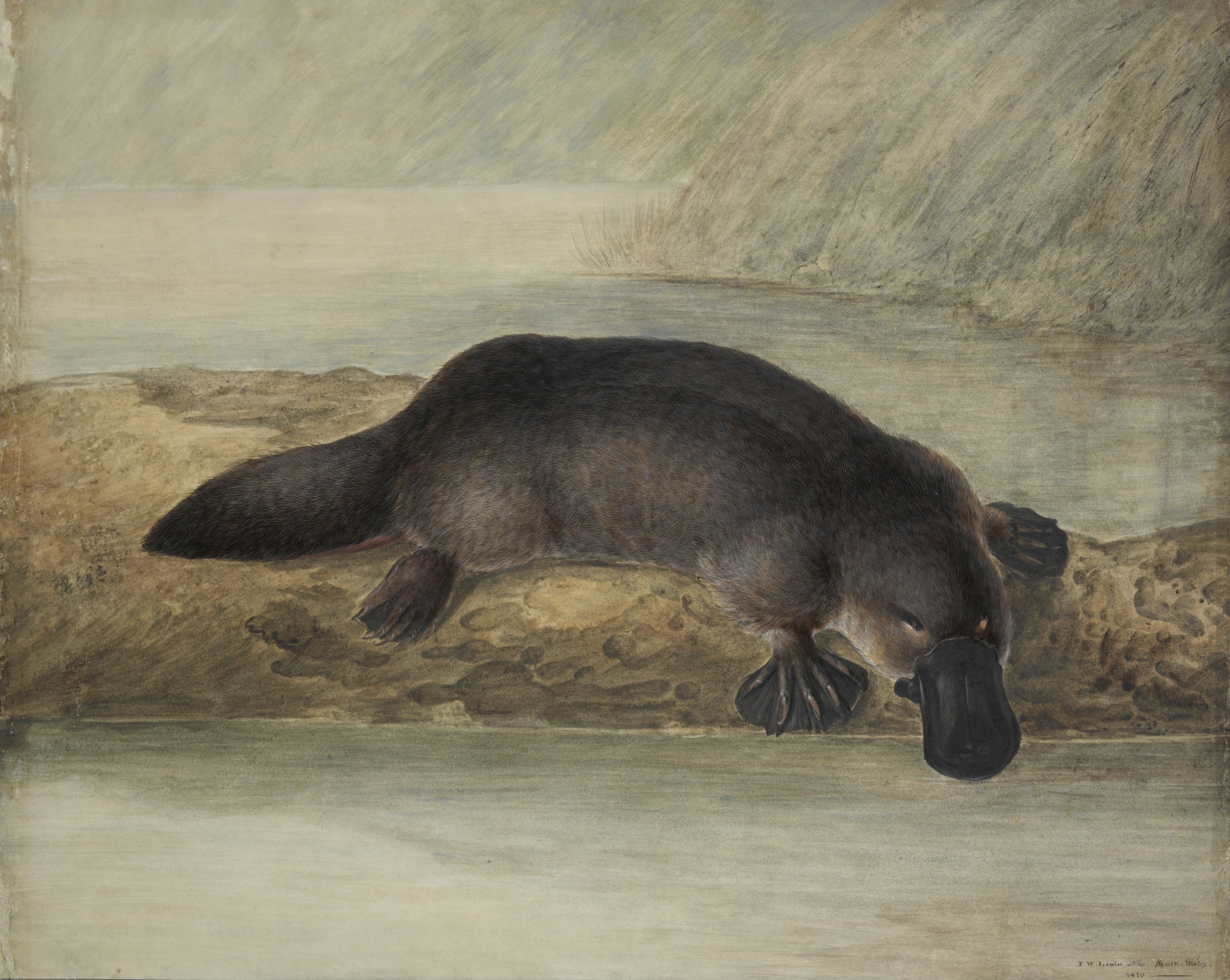
Ornithorhynchus anatinus Painting by John Lewin of a platypus, painted in 1808 or 1810.

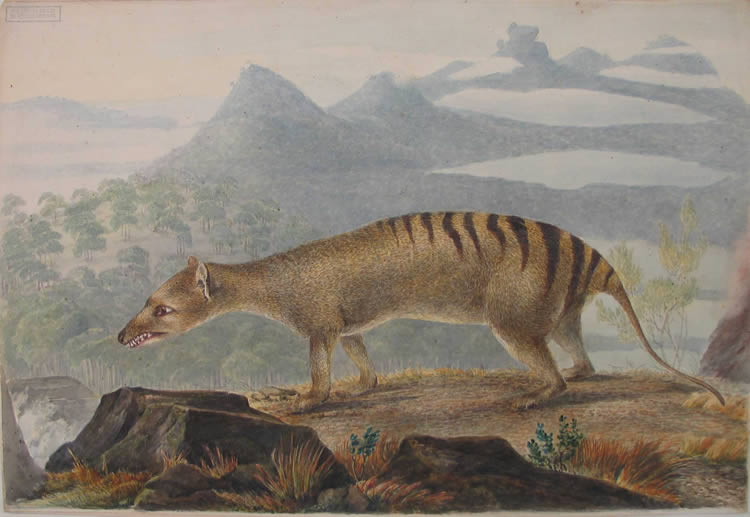
Thylacinus cynocephalus Painting by John Lewin of a thylacine (Tasmanian tiger), painted in 1817.

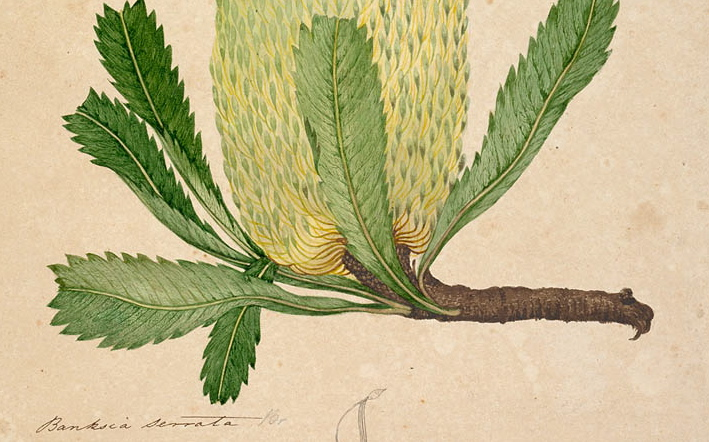
Banksia serrata [Detail] C. 1803-1808?

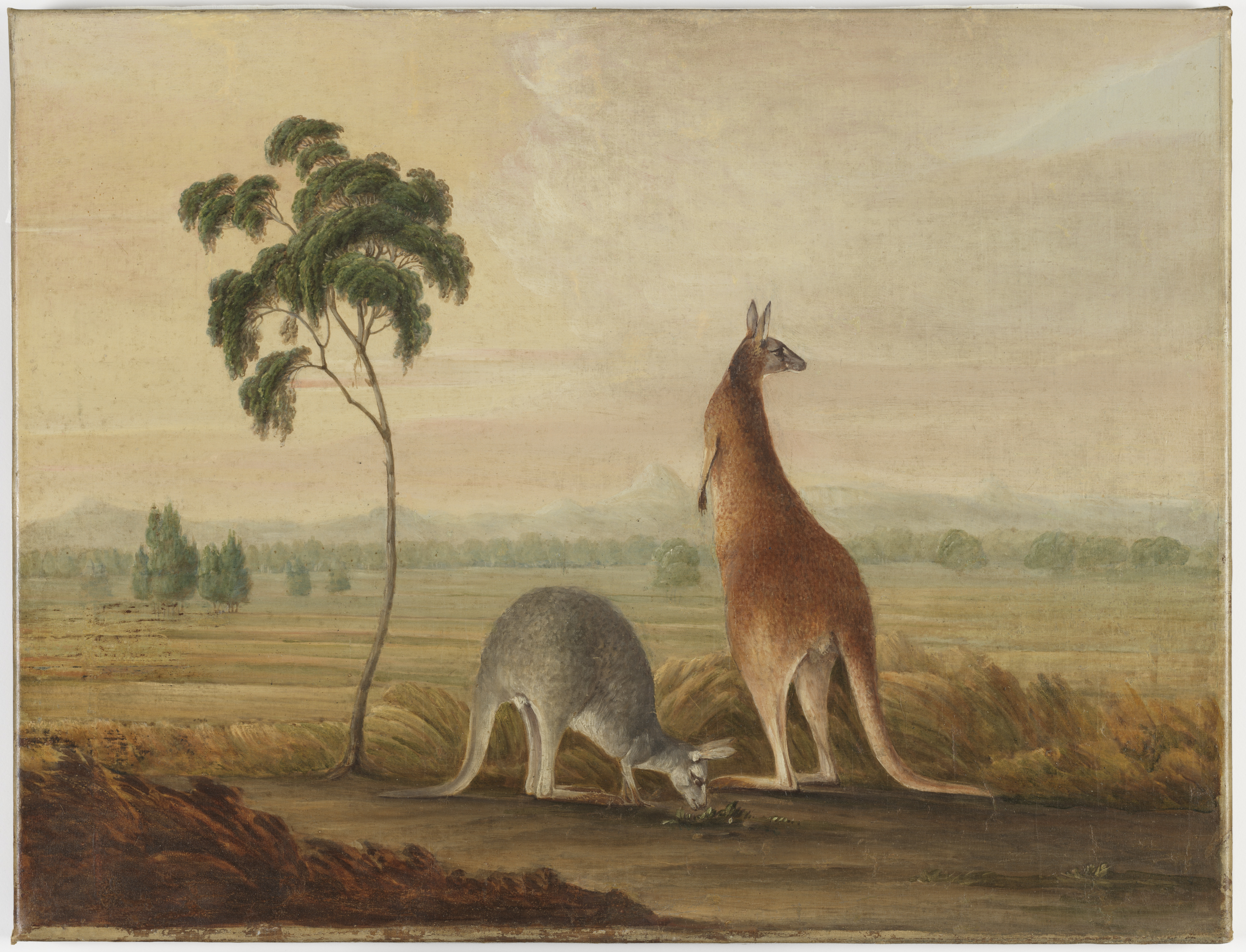
Red kangaroos, Liverpool Plains, Sydney, ca. 1819

== See also ==
- Art of Australia
- List of Australian botanical illustrators
