= Maria Josepha of Dietrichstein =

German noblewoman

Maria Josepha of Dietrichstein (Maria Josepha Antonia; 29 June 1694 – 3 September 1758), was a German noblewoman member of the House of Dietrichstein and by marriage Countess and later Princess Kinsky of Wchinitz und Tettau.

She was the eldest child and daughter of Walther Franz Xaver Anton, 5th Prince of Dietrichstein and his second wife Karolina Maximiliana, a daughter of Count George Christoph of Proskau.

== Life ==
In Vienna on 25 February 1717, Maria Josepha married with Štěpán Vilém (26 December 1679 – 12 March 1749), Count and since 1746 Prince Kinsky of Wchinitz und Tettau. They had five children:

- Evžen František (1719 – 1726).
- Františka Josefa (born and died 1720).
- Maria Theresia Josepha Maximiliana (13 September 1721 – 13 August 1751), married on 18 August 1743 to Georg Olivier, Count Wallis of Carighmain.
- Charlotte (1723 – 1728).
- František Josef (11 October 1726 – 23 September 1752), 2nd Prince Kinsky of Wchinitz und Tettau; married on 28 August 1748 to Countess Maria Leopoldina Pálffy.
