= Walther Franz Xaver Anton, Prince of Dietrichstein =

German prince (1664–1738)

Walther Franz Xaver Anton, Prince of Dietrichstein. Lithograph by Robert Theer.

Walther Franz Xaver Anton, Prince of Dietrichstein (18 September 1664 – 3 November 1738), was a German prince member of the House of Dietrichstein, 5th Prince (Fürst) of Dietrichstein zu Nikolsburg, Princely Count (gefürsteter Graf) of Tarasp, Baron (Freiherr) of Hollenburg, Finkenstein and Thalberg.

== Early life ==
He was born as the sixth child and fourth (but third surviving) son of Ferdinand Joseph, 3rd Prince of Dietrichstein, and his wife, Princess Marie Elisabeth of Eggenberg, daughter of Johann Anton I, Prince of Eggenberg, Duke of Český Krumlov and Princely Count (gefürsteter Graf) of Gradisca d'Isonzo.

== Biography ==
As the third son of his family, since early childhood Walther Franz was destined to a Church career; in consequence, he studied theology and law in Salzburg and later became a Canon in Olomouc and Passau. After some time, however, he renounced his ecclesiastical offices.

The death of his brother Karl Joseph (29 September 1693) without offspring left Walther Franz as the heir of the titles and lands of the Nikolsburg branch of the House of Dietrichstein, because his eldest brother Leopold Ignaz Joseph was unable to produce male offspring.

Walther Franz inherited the title of Prince of Dietrichstein after the death of his brother on 13 July 1708. Because Leopold Ignaz exhausted the family fortune with his wasteful and extravagant lifestyle, the new prince was forced to stabilize the financial situation of his domains, which brought him in later years frequent allegations of frugality.

For many years, Walther Franz was devoted to a military career. He participated in many successful battles under the leadership of one of the greatest generals of that time, Prince Eugene of Savoy. In 1697 he fought against the Turks in the Battle of Zenta, during 1704-1706 he participated in the War of the Spanish Succession against the French in the Battles of Blenheim and Turin. In 1717 he participated in the siege and conquest of Belgrade.

In the Imperial court, Walther Franz only held the functions of Privy Councillor and Kämmerer of Emperors Joseph I and Charles VI. He focused more on a provincial official career: during 1701-1702 he was named High Moravian Judge (nejvyšším moravským sudím), during 1702-1714 he held the position of Moravian Valet (moravským zemským komorníkem), and also was a deputy governor and president of some provincial commissions.

In 1717 a great fire broke out in Nikolsburg, which destroyed part of the city. Two years later (1719) another fire broke out; this time, Nikolsburg Castle was significantly affected and Walther Franz was forced to finance an extensive redevelopment to his residence. The architectural plans where formulated by Christian Alexander Oedtl, who worked for many years for the princely family. Originally a complex of three main buildings, Oedtl changed the main structure of the castle but maintained the historic facade. When repairing the castle, a new terrace and pavilion were built. The author of the rich sculptural interior decoration on the newly created castle was the young sculptor Ignaz Lengelacher. The reconstruction of the ancestral entrance hall was decorated with frescoes newly painted by Jan George Werle, while the author of the frescoes in the Hall of the Ancestors was the painter Anton Joseph von Prenner, who was also the art advisor of Walther Franz and his late brother Leopold Ignaz. Of these undoubtedly representative paintings today exist only the decoration in the sala terrena; the rest disappeared during a fire in 1945.

In 1731 he was entered in Austrian branch of the Order of the Golden Fleece as the 661 Knight since his foundation.

Walther Franz died aged 74. Despite the expensive reconstruction of Nikolsburg Castle and his charitable foundations, he managed to stabilize the financial situation of the family. Before he died, he gave to his second surviving son Johann Baptist Leopold the districts of Boskovice (inherited from his first wife in 1691) and Sokolnice (which he purchased in 1705) as an appanage.

== Marriages and Issue ==
On 12 July 1687, Walther Franz married firstly with Zuzana Liborie Katerina Praksická ze Zástrizl (1637 – 9 April 1691), heiress of Boskovice. They had no children.

In Brno on 30 August 1693, Walter Franz married secondly with Countess Karolina Maximiliana of Proskau (2 September 1674 – 9 September 1734), daughter of Count George Christoph of Proskau and Countess Maria Rosalia of Thurn-Valsassina-Como-Vercelli. They had ten children, of whom only five survive adulthood:

- Maria Josepha Antonia (29 June 1694 – 3 September 1758), married on 25 February 1717 to Štěpán Vilém, Count and later Prince Kinsky of Wchinitz und Tettau.
- Maria Rosalia Theresia (29 July 1695 – 14 June 1708).
- Maria Anna Eleonore (14 July 1696 – 1697).
- Karl Franz Xaver Ferdinand Dominik (4 August 1697 – 2 November 1703).
- Maria Eleonore Franziska (10 June 1698 – 20 November 1698).
- Johann Joseph Adam (10 September 1699 – 25 April 1709).
- Maria Aloysia Franziska (21 April 1700 – 13/17 December 1783), married on 19 December 1729 to Count Michael Wenzel of Althann.
- Karl Maximilian Philipp Franz Xaver (28 April 1702 – 24 October 1784), 6th Prince of Dietrichstein.
- Johann Baptist Leopold (24 June 1703 – 11 March 1773).
- Johann Adam Ambrosius (7 December 1704 – 30 December 1728).

== Ancestry ==
Ancestors of Walther Franz Xaver Anton, Prince of Dietrichstein

16. Baron Adam von Dietrichstein
8. Count Sigismund of Dietrichstein
17. Margareta Folch de Cardona y Requesens
4. Maximilian, 2nd Prince of Dietrichstein
18. Baron Hans Warmund von der Leiter
9. Baroness Johanna von der Leiter
19. Baroness Elisabeth von Thurn
2. Ferdinand Joseph, 3rd Prince of Dietrichstein
20. Baron Hartmann von und zu Liechtenstein
10. Karl I, Prince of Liechtenstein
21. Countess Anna Maria von Ortenburg
5. Princess Anna Maria von und zu Liechtenstein
22. Baron Jan Šembera von Boskowitz and Černá Hora
11. Baroness Anna Maria Šemberová of Boskovice and Černá Hora
23. Baroness Anna Krajířová von Krajk
1. Walther Franz Xaver Anton, 5th Prince of Dietrichstein
24. Baron Seyfried von Eggenberg
12. Prince Hans Ulrich von Eggenberg
25. Anna Benigna Galler von Schwanberg
6. Prince Johann Anton I. of Eggenberg
26. Baron Konrad von Thannhausen
13. Baroness Maria Sidonia von Thannhausen
27. Dorothea von Teuffenbach
3. Maria Elisabeth of Eggenberg
28. John George, Elector of Brandenburg
14. Christian, Margrave of Brandenburg-Bayreuth
29. Princess Elisabeth of Anhalt-Zerbst
7. Anna Maria von Brandenburg-Bayreuth
30. Albert Frederick, Duke of Prussia
15. Marie of Prussia
31. Marie Eleonore of Cleves
