= Maria Aloysia of Dietrichstein =

German noblewoman and countess

Maria Aloysia of Dietrichstein (Maria Aloysia Franziska; 21 April 1700 – 13/17 December 1783), was a German noblewoman member of the House of Dietrichstein and by marriage Countess of Althann.

She was the seventh child and fifth (but second surviving) daughter of Walther Franz Xaver Anton, 5th Prince of Dietrichstein and his second wife Karolina Maximiliana, a daughter of Count George Christoph of Proskau.

== Life ==
On 19 December 1729 Maria Aloysia married with Michael Wenzel (29 July 1668 – 25 July 1738), Count of Althann and Baron of Goldpurg zu Murstetten. They had four children:

- Michael Joseph (1730 – 1754).
- Karoline (1731 – 1739).
- Michael Franz Xaver (born and died 1732).
- Maria Wilhelmine (1733 – 5 July 1773), married on 17 February 1754 to Count Leopold Joseph of Neipperg.

Maria Aloysia died in Brno aged 83.
