= Ignaz Lengelacher =

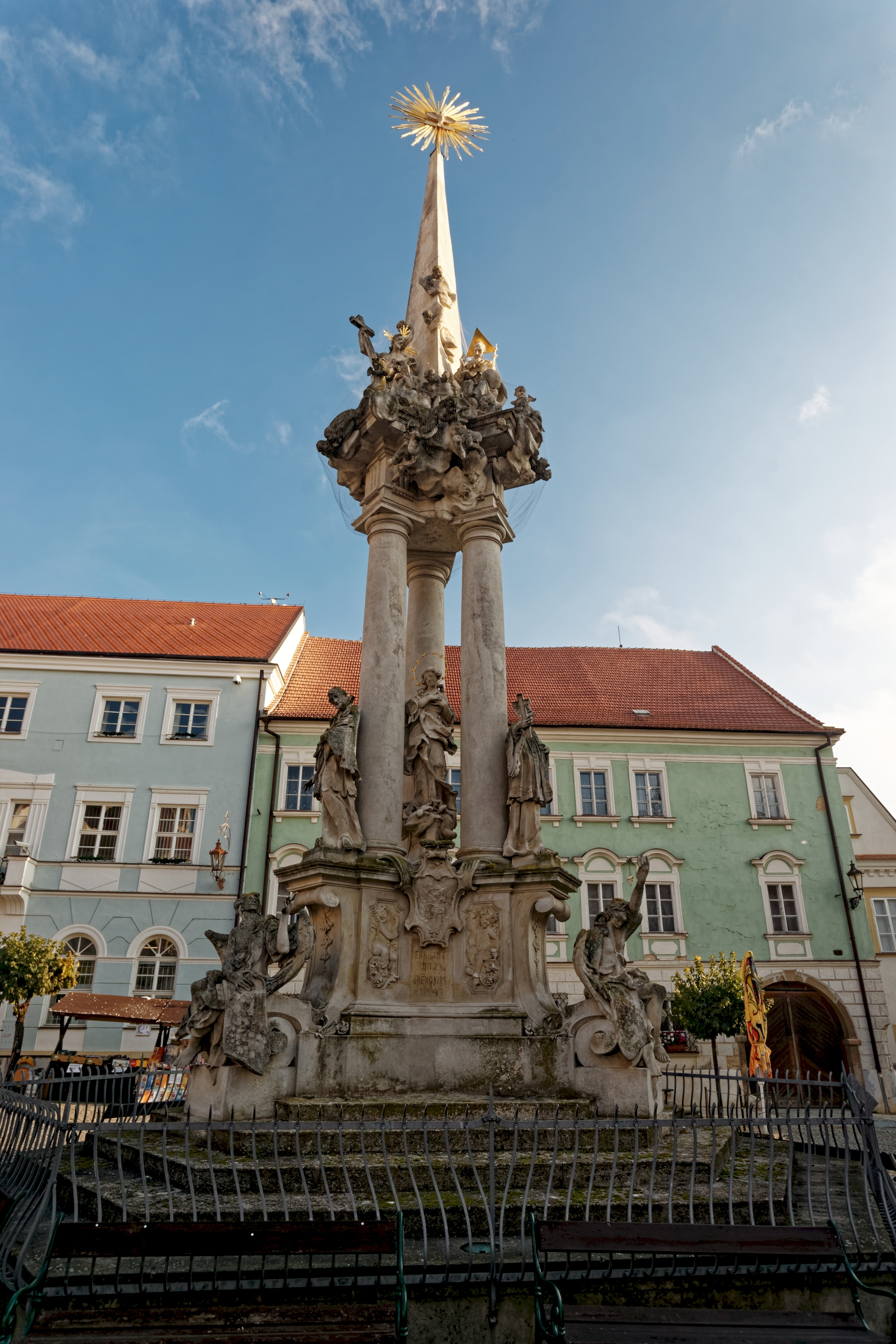
The Holy Trinity Column, Mikulov

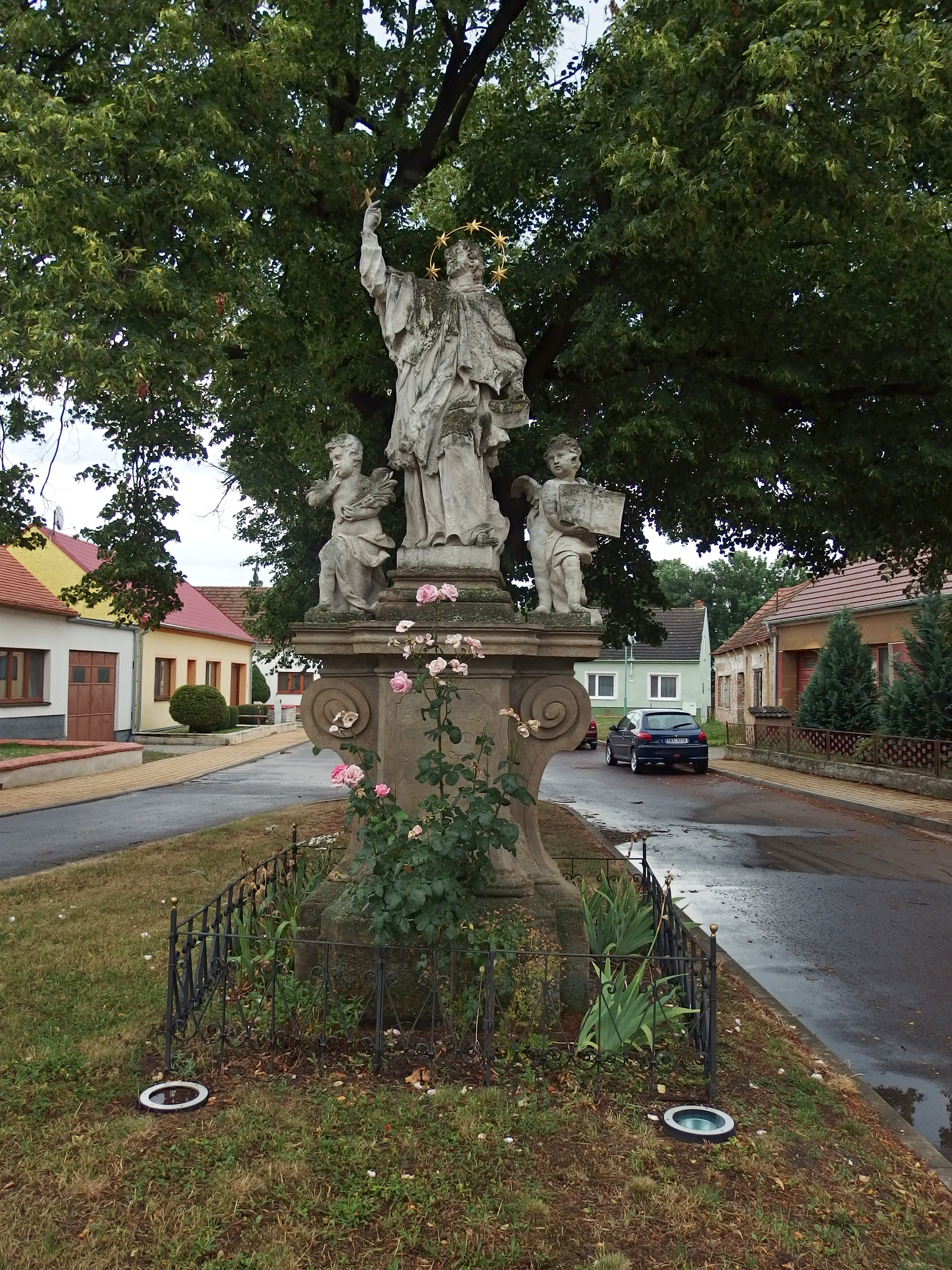
Saint John of Nepomuk, Olbramovice

Ignaz Lengelacher (25 July 1698, near Peißenberg - c. 1780, Baden) was a German-born Baroque sculptor; primarily active in south Moravia which was then part of Bohemia.

== Life and work ==
Little is known of him before 1717, when he was an assistant in the workshops of Giovanni Stanetti, Lorenzo Mattielli, and Giovanni Giuliani; helping to create sculptures for the gardens at the Belvedere Palaces in Vienna. Around 1723, he entered the service of Walther Franz Xaver Anton, Prince of Dietrichstein; providing decorations and statues for Nikolsburg Castle. His decorations are very diverse, including amphorae, putti, reliefs, busts, and animal figures. He also created a "Holy Trinity Column" for the former St. Anne's Church, site of the Dietrichstein family tomb, from designs by the painter, Anton Joseph von Prenner. The Torah ark at the Nikolsburg Synagogue has been credited to him as well.

He favored certain religious figures; notably Saint John of Nepomuk, with statues in Wolframitz (Olbramovice), 1728), Neumühl (Nové Mlýny, 1731) and Kanitz (Dolní Kounice, 1735). A wooden statue (1740), originally in Nikolsburg, is now at the Moravian Gallery in Brno. He always changed the composition and expression, to match the statue's specific settings. Another favorite iconographic motif was Saint Florian.

In the early 1730s, he worked at the church in Unterwisternitz (Dolní Věstonice), creating side altars, decorating the pulpit, and designing the main altar, with a figure of Saint Michael. This was followed by work at the Benedictine Church of Saints Peter and Paul in Groß Raigern (Rajhrad), a project that involved the main altar, pulpit, and organ choir. He worked on numerous smaller commissions throughout the region, until the 1750s.

In 1754, for unknown reasons, he sold the inventory of his workshop at a public auction, and moved back to Germany. There, he established himself in Karlsruhe and became a Court Sculptor for the Margraviate of Baden. One of his major projects was creating decorations for Rastatt Castle. His death is believed to have occurred sometime around 1780.
