= Anton Joseph von Prenner =

Austrian painter, engraver and publisher (1683–1761)

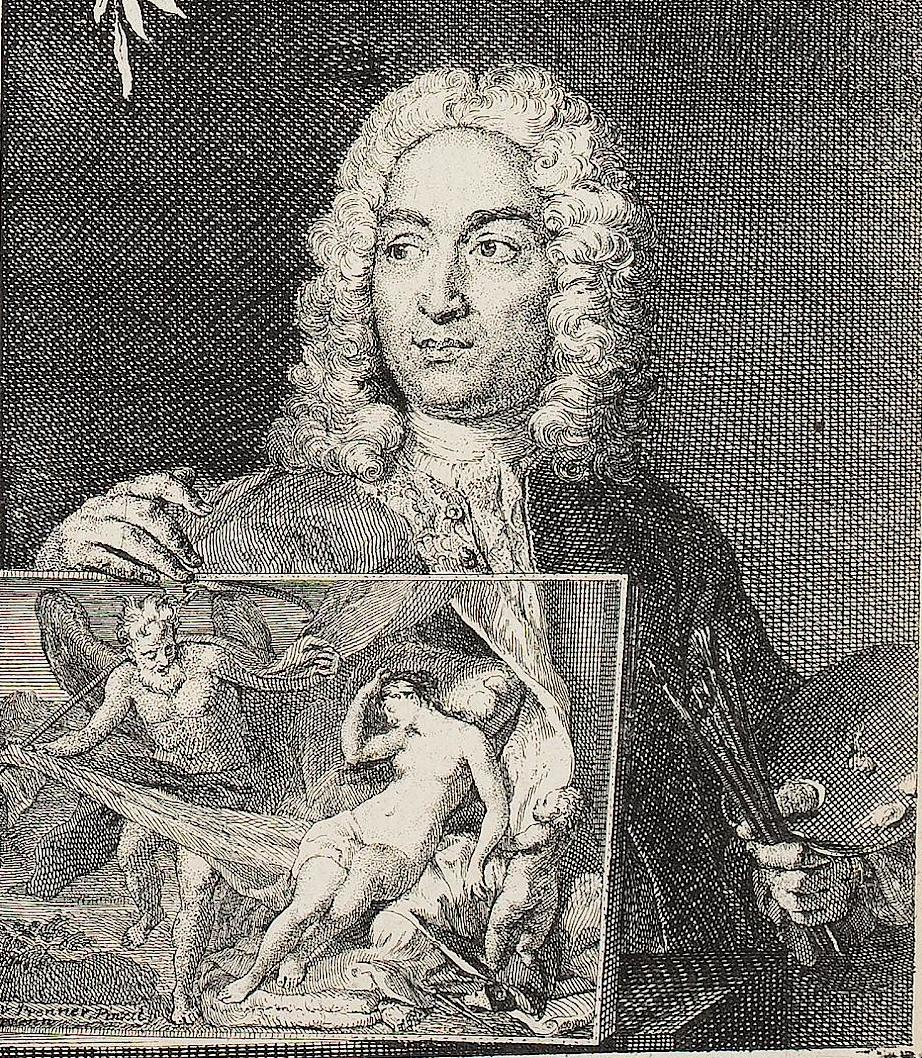
- Born: 7 March 1683; Wallerstein
- Died: 1761 (aged 77–78); Vienna

Anton Joseph von Prenner or von Brenner (7 March 1683 – 1761) was an Austrian painter, engraver and publisher. He is mainly known for his publications recording the Imperial art collections kept in the Stallburg gallery.

== Life and work ==
Details about the life of the artist are very scarce. It is believed von Prenner was born in Wallerstein, County of Oettingen on 7 March 1683. It is not clear with whom he trained. He initially embarked on a career as a painter of religious scenes. He was active in Augsburg. In Budišov (formerly Budischau in the Iglauer Kreis) he painted altarpieces for the local parish church. He was active in Mikulov (formerly (Nikolsburg in Südmähren) in the 1720s where he painted frescoes for Walther Franz Xaver Anton, Prince of Dietrichstein in his renovated castle (destroyed in World War II).

He moved to Vienna in 1728 where he is recorded until 1735. He became a court engraver to the emperor in Vienna.

He worked together with the Flemish court painter and printmaker Frans van Stampart on various publication projects. He is recorded in Augsburg in 1740.

He was an uncle of the painter and engraver Georg Kaspar von Prenner He died in Vienna in 1761.

== Work ==
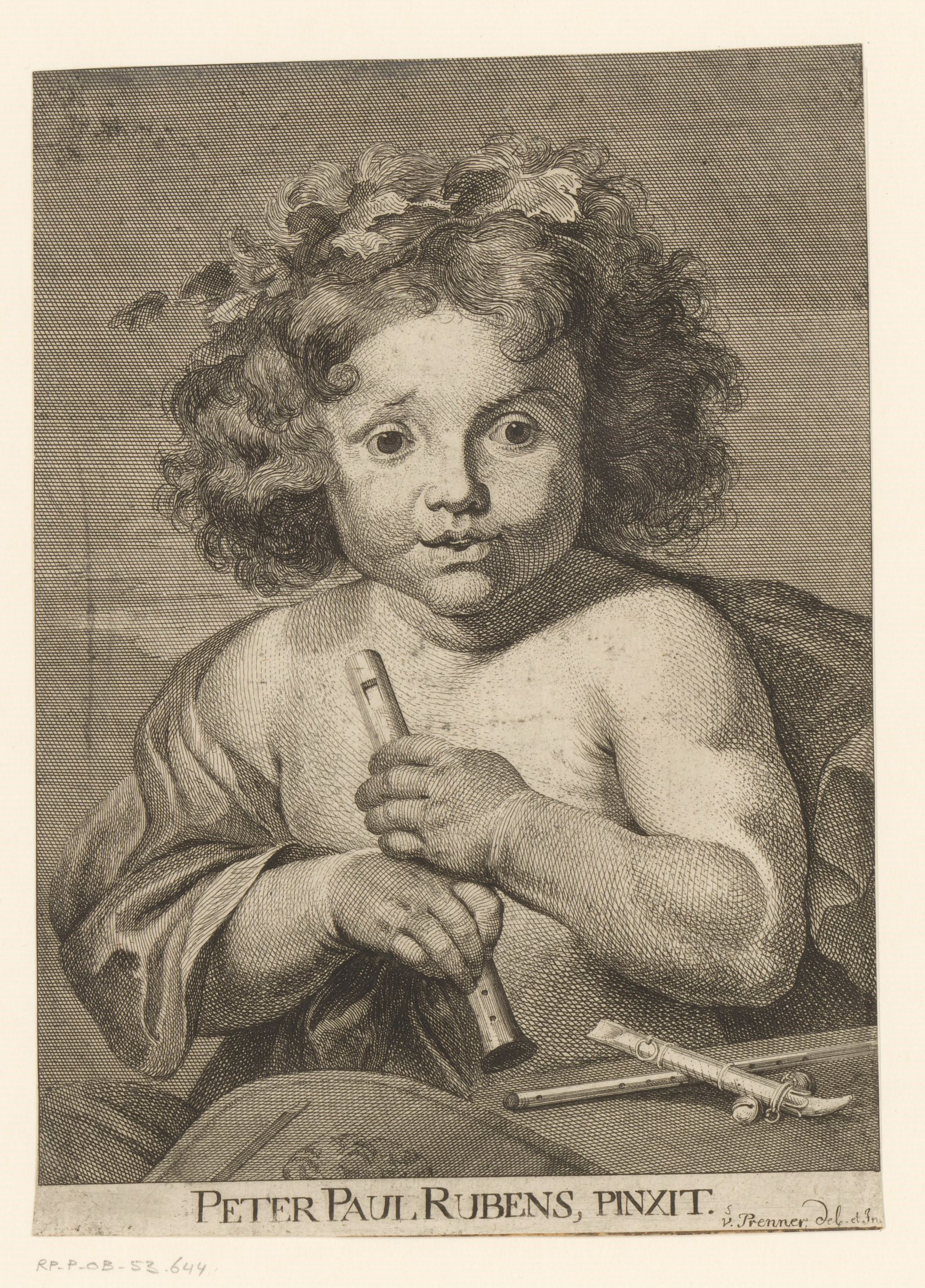
Child with a flute after Rubens, from the 'Theatrum artis pictoriae'

Von Prenner initially worked as a painter. He painted altarpieces for the local parish church in Budišov and the Dominican Church in Augsburg. One of the latter paintings depicting the Ascension of Christ is in the collection of the Bavarian State Painting Collections.

He later changed to making prints. He started collaborating with Frans van Stampart on a publication project that was entitled Theatrum artis pictoriae. The publication was likely inspired by the new display of the Imperial art collection in the Stallburg gallery. The plan was to publish 30 volumes of prints representing the entire Imperial art collection in Stallburg. Only four volumes were printed between 1728 and 1733. Each of the four volumes contains 40 full page copper engravings depicting the paintings in the Stallburg gallery in a laterally inverted way. The first two plates of volume I offer plans of the galleries with views of six rooms. The rendering of the paintings is not always very detailed and sometimes parts of paintings are distorted in the prints. According to which criteria the selection of the paintings was made is not clear and the publication does not offer any art historical explanation. The important achievement of von Prenner and van Stampart was to be the first to include in a publication works from the old German school.

Due to the difficult preparatory work and prolonged publication history of the Theatrum, von Prenner and van Stampart published the Prodromus (full title: Prodromus, seu Praeambulare lumen reserati portentosae magnificentiae theatri, quo omnia ad aulam caesaream in Augustissimae suae caesareae) in Vienna in 1735. It was intended to give a preview of the volumes of the Theatrum that had yet to appear ('prodromus' means a preliminary publication or introductory work). The Prodromus offers an overview of the works already published in the Theatrum and a preview of what the next volumes would offer. It reprises the plans of the galleries with views of six rooms of the Theatrum. These are followed by plates showing the walls of the galleries, completely covered by framed paintings. Each of the 24 plates reproduce 960 paintings by 230 painters with fast strokes. Four pages show 228 sculptures, reliefs, gems and medals in the collection. One of the important improvements in the Prodromus in comparison to the Theatrum is that the paintings are rendered not in mirror view starting from plate 8. This publication enjoyed support in high places as is shown by the fact that prominent aristocrats engraved some of the plates: Count Leopold Windischgraetz (plate 9), the counts Anton and Johann Nepomuk Csáky (plates 11 and 13) and Maria Barbara Lemperg (plate 12).

== Gallery ==
Selected prints from the Prodromus

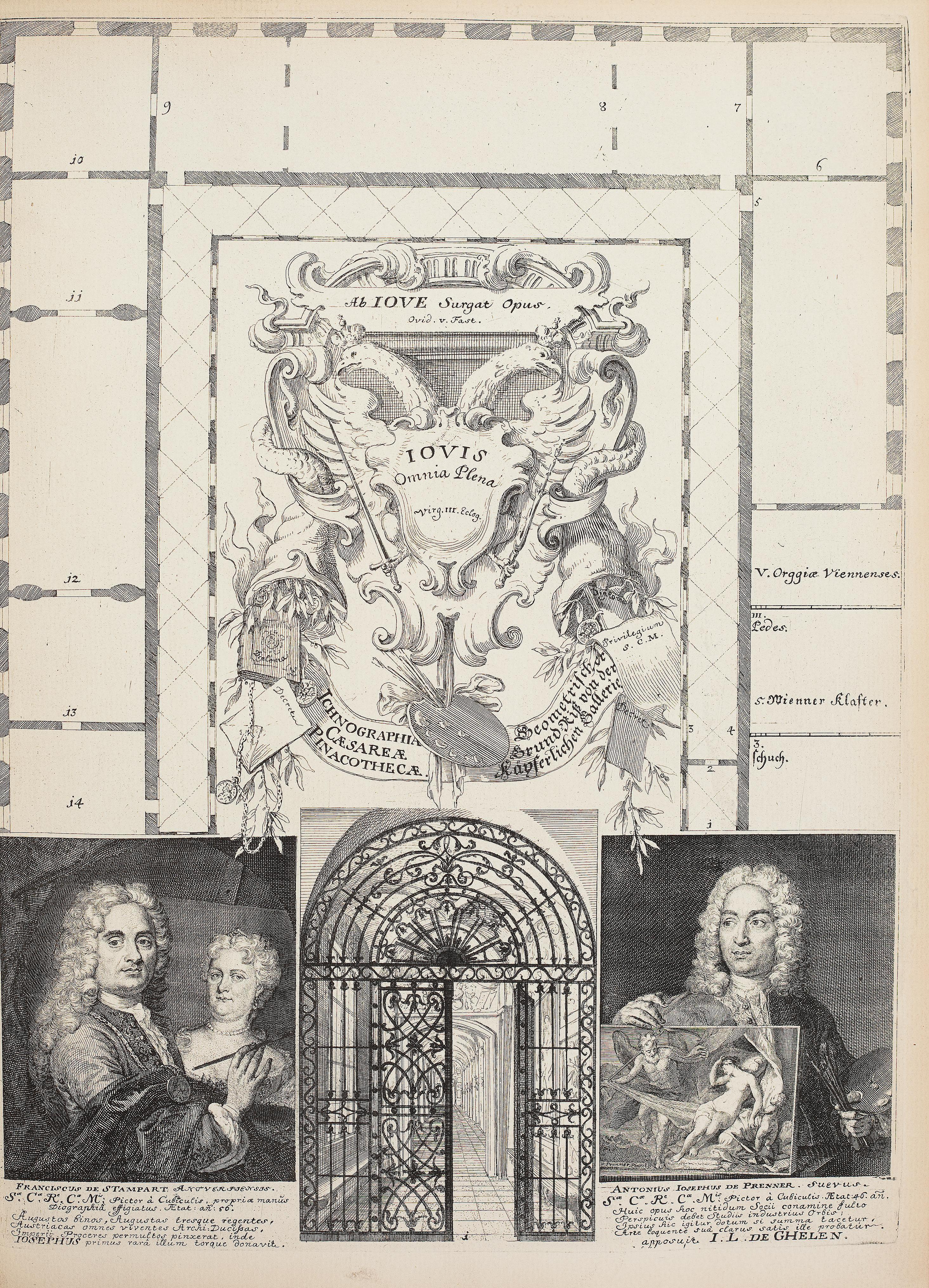
Plan of the Stallburg collection with portraits of Frans van Stampart (on left) and Anton Joseph von Prenner (on right)

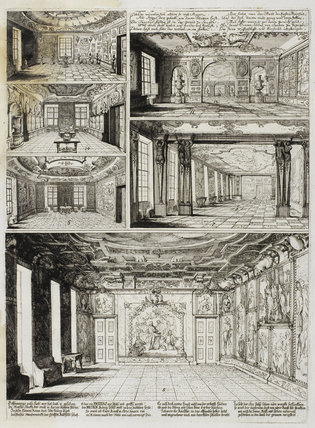
Prodromus: View of the galleries

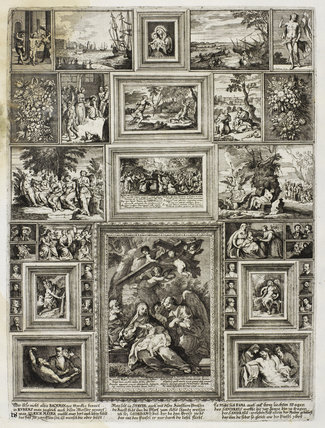
Prodromus: Plate 18
