= Prodromus =

A prodromus ('forerunner' or 'precursor') a.k.a. prodrome is a term used in the natural sciences to describe a preliminary publication intended as the basis for a later, more comprehensive work.

It is also a medical term used for a premonitory symptom, that is, a symptom indicating the onset of a disease.

The origin of the word is from the 19th century: via French from New Latin prodromus, from Greek prodromos, meaning forerunner.

Nicolas Steno's De solido intra solidum naturaliter contento dissertationis prodromus, one of the early treatises attempting to explain the occurrence of fossils in solid rock.

Ludovico Marracci's Arabic edition and Latin translation of the Qur’an was published in 1698. His ‘Introduction’ (Prodromus) had been published seven years earlier.

Other notable prodromi include Prodromus Entomology, Prodromus Florae Novae Hollandiae et Insulae Van Diemen, Prodromus Systematis Naturalis Regni Vegetabilis.

== See also ==
- White paper
