= Maria Ann Lewin =

English artist of Australian natural history (1765–1850)

Maria created some of the artwork for The Birds of New Holland.

Maria Ann Lewin (1765–1850), also known as Anna Maria or by either name separately, (Note: She is called Maria Ann in her death certificate and in her own writing. Neville (2012), p. 258.) was an English artist and businesswoman who contributed to some of Australia’s early works of scientific illustration.

== Life ==
Maria was the wife of her fellow natural history artist John Lewin. In 1799, they planned to travel to Australia aboard the HMS Buffalo, but when John missed the boat, Maria made the journey alone. Accused of misconduct with the Buffalo’s second mate, she initiated a court case to defend herself and was acquitted in February 1800.

John and Maria had a son, William, in about 1808. They were granted land near Parramatta, but, finding no success in farming it, John and Maria moved to Sydney, where they offered drawing classes and Maria ran several businesses including a pub, the Bunch of Grapes, and a general store.

Maria contributed drawings of plants to John’s work on natural history, including The Birds of New Holland, which was published in London in 1804–8. She also coloured the plates once they had been engraved.

After John’s death in 1819, Maria returned to England with their son and arranged for further publication of their books, which she continued promoting. She oversaw the production an edition of The Birds in 1822. From 1825 she received an annual grant of £50 from the government of New South Wales.
