= Stallburg =

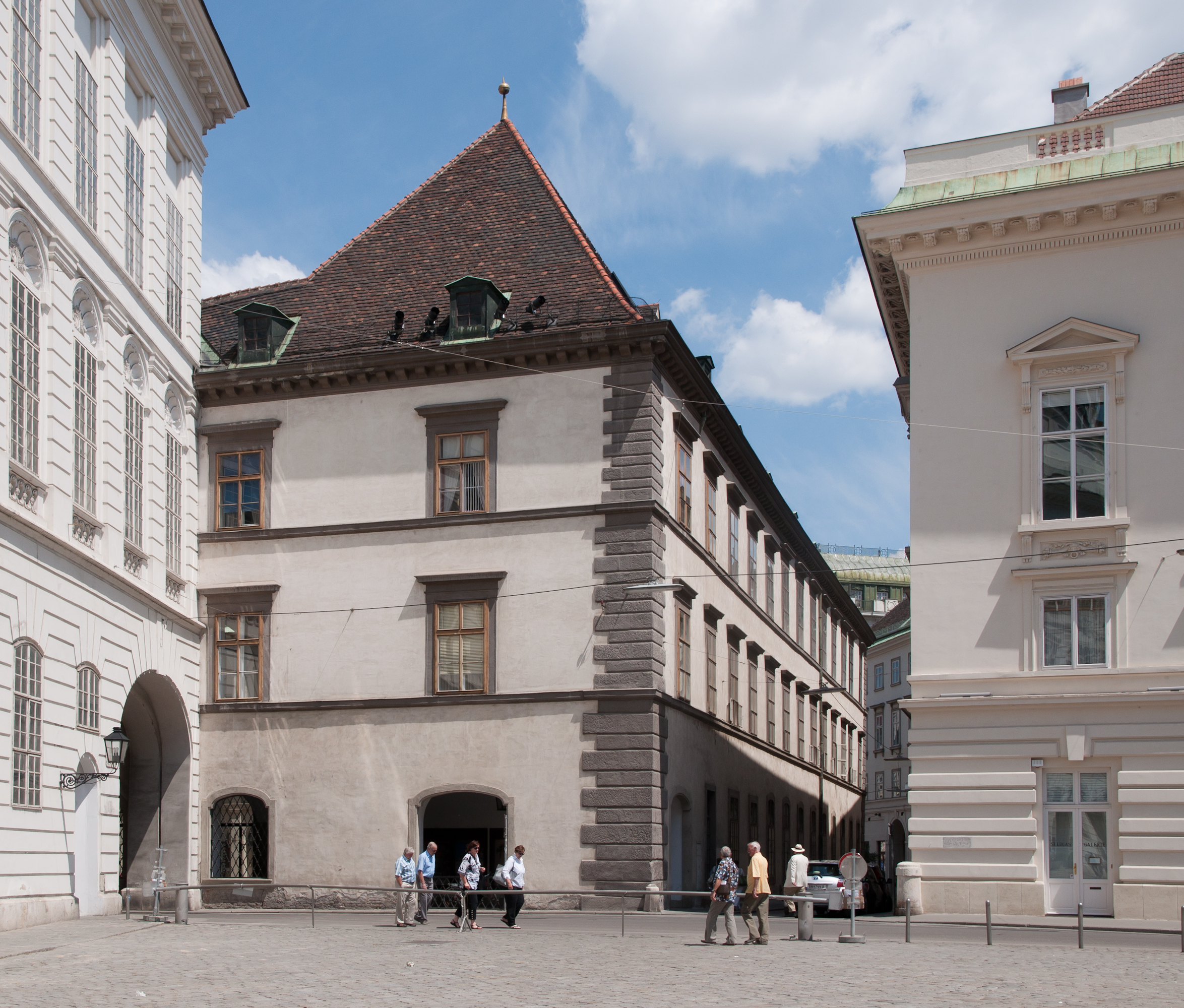

- Location within Vienna
- 48°12′25.92″N 16°22′1.92″E

History
- Built: c. 1558–1565

Site notes
- Architectural style: Renaissance

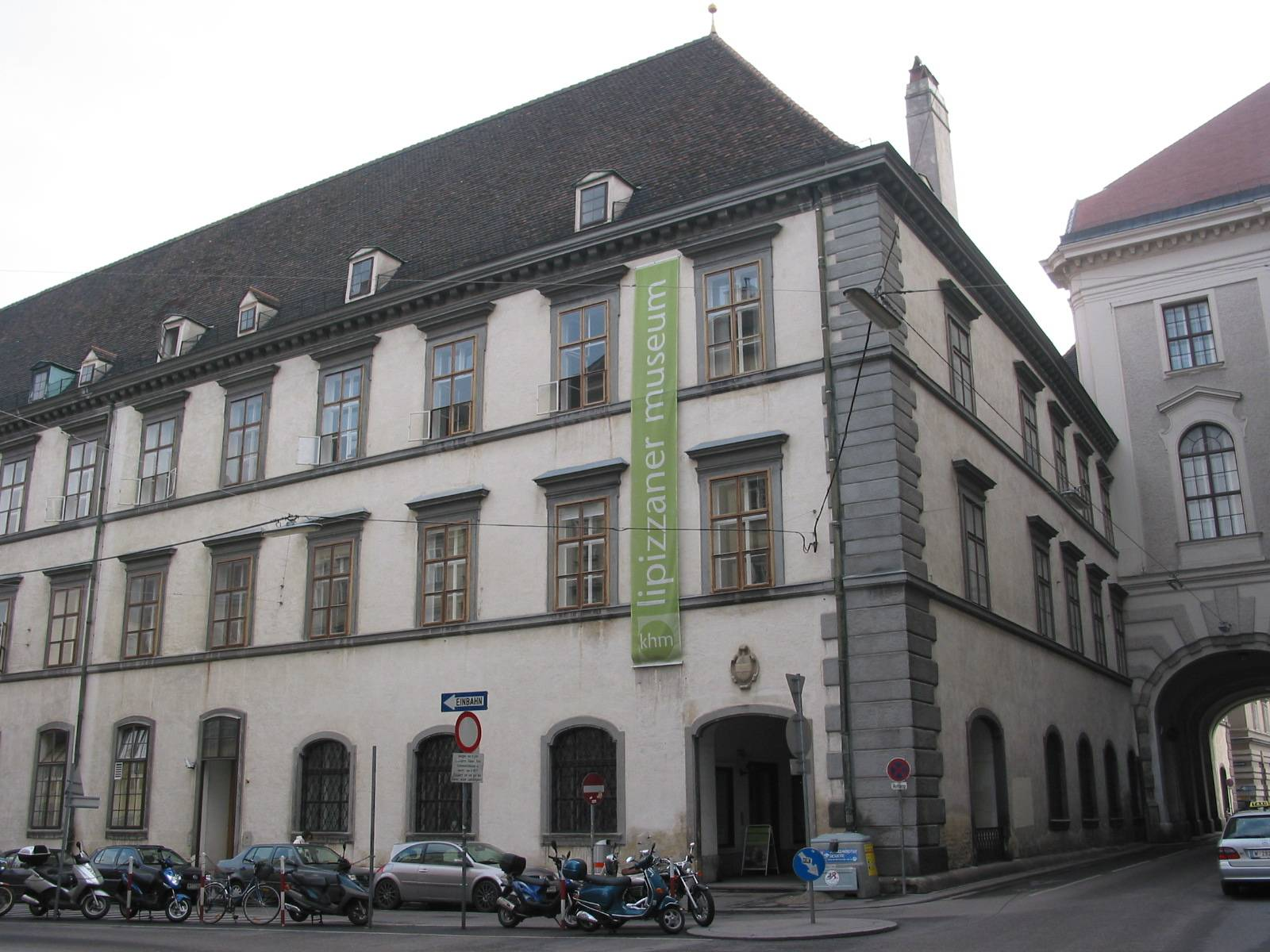
Stallburg, North facade

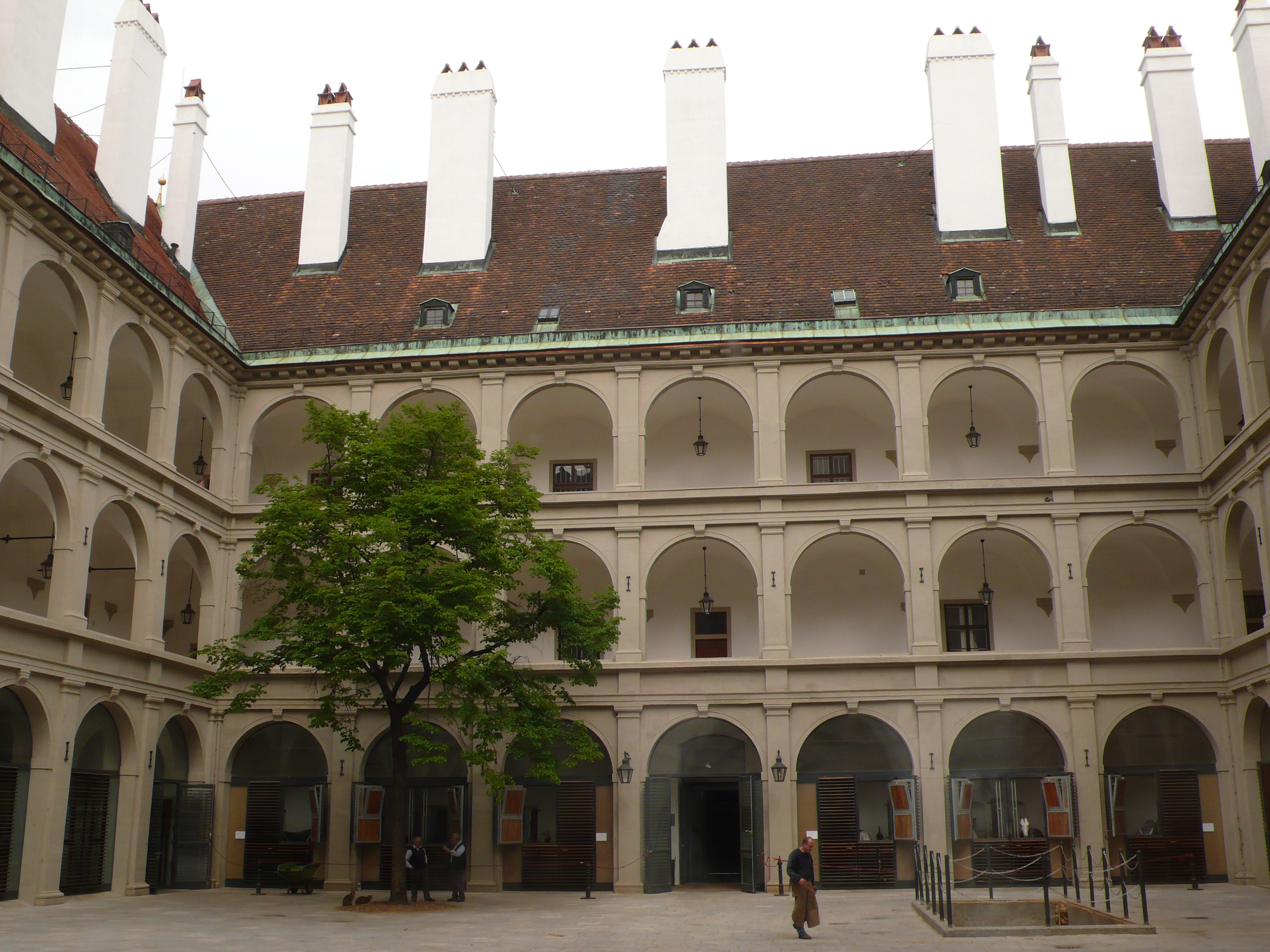
Stallburg, arcade

The Stallburg is a renaissance-style building in the Vienna city center located between Josefsplatz and Michaelerplatz. It is part of the Hofburg Palace.

Formerly the living quarters of Archduke Maximilian, later Emperor Maximilian II, it was built around 1558–1565 as a residence. From 1659 to 1776 it housed the art collection of Archduke Leopold Wilhelm, called the Stallburg gallery. This collection forms the core of the later Kunsthistorisches Museum from 1889. Later the building became the Imperial Stables used to house the imperial horses, and even today it is still used by the Spanish Riding School (Spanische Hofreitschule).

Before moving to Vienna in 1659, Archduke Leopold Wilhelm formed his art collection of 1400 paintings in Brussels, where David Teniers the Younger painted views of his Brussels gallery, which are now spread among various collections. He made many miniatures of the paintings for use as models by engravers and published a catalog of the Italian paintings in the 1660s called Theatrum Pictorium.

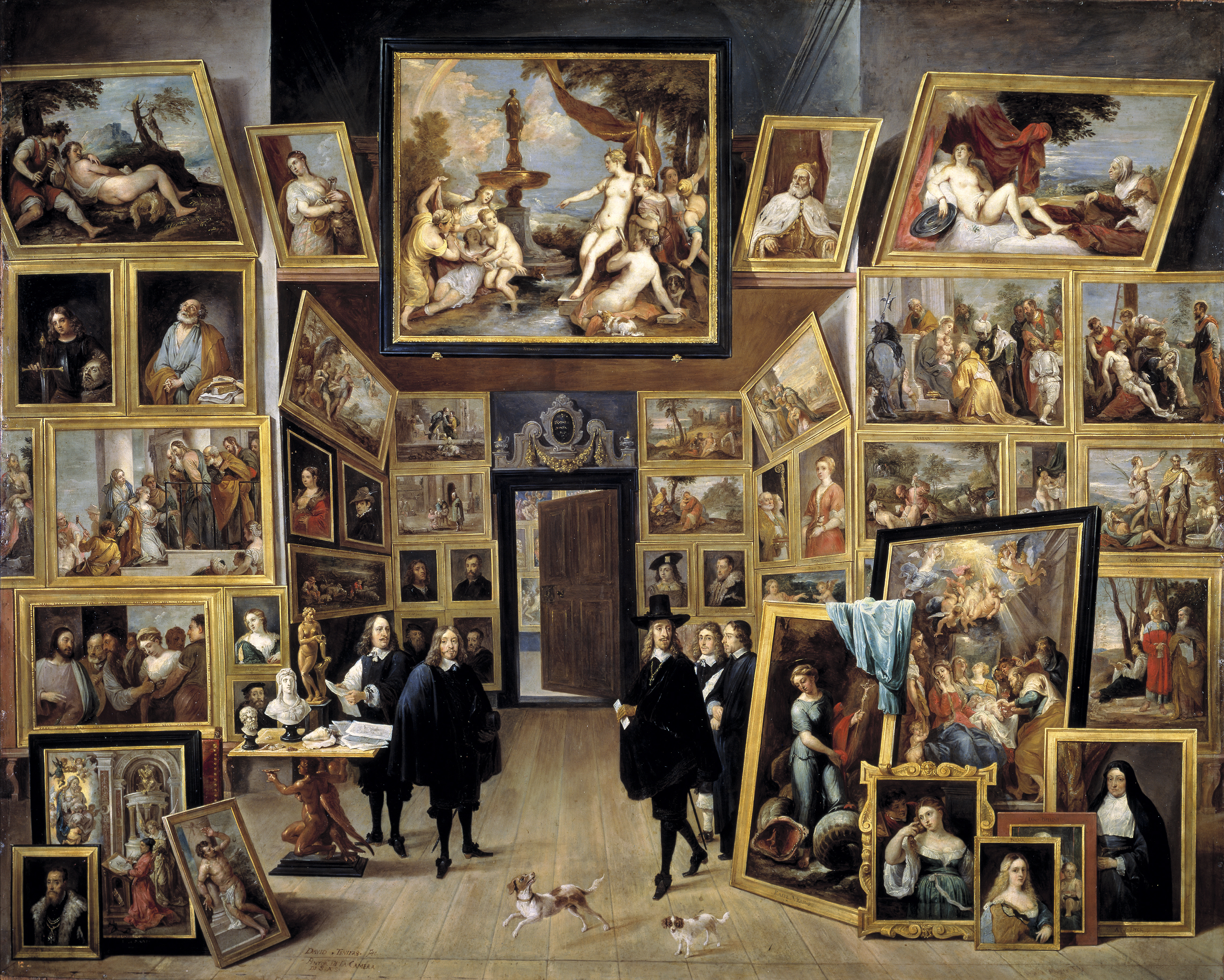
The Archduke Leopold Wilhelm in his Painting Gallery in Brussels, Prado

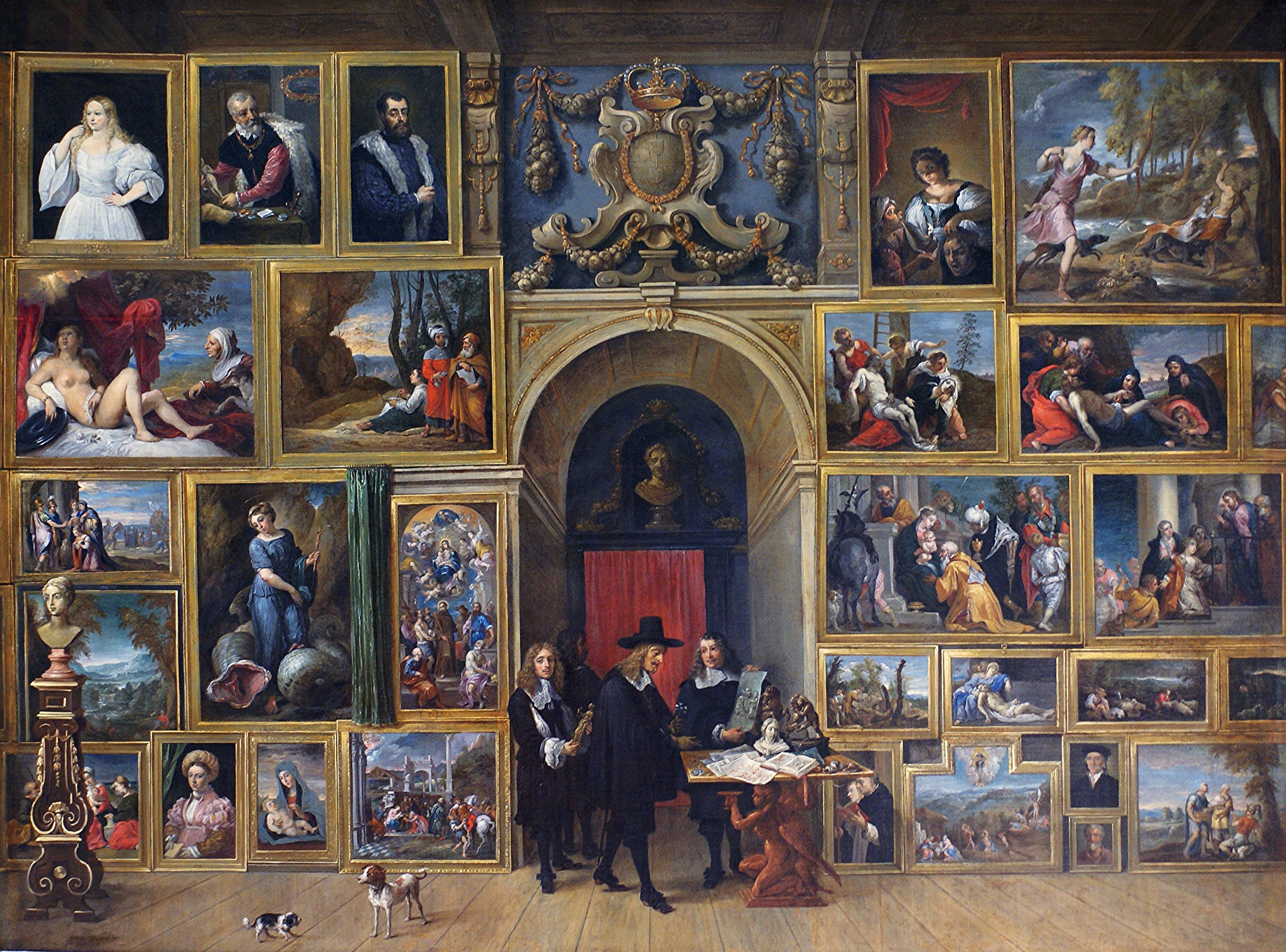
Gallery of Archduke Leopold Wilhelm (Brussels), Royal Museums of Fine Arts of Belgium

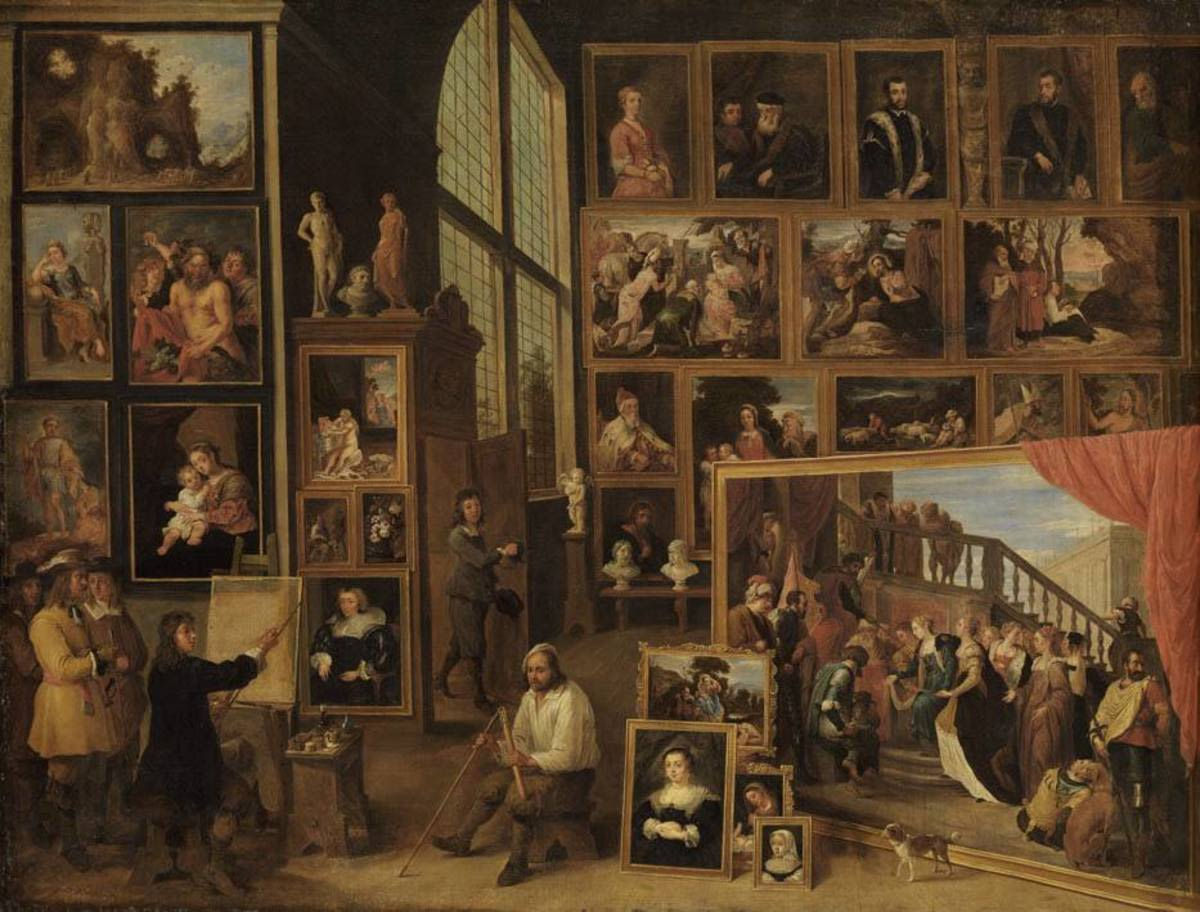
Neues Schloss Schleißheim

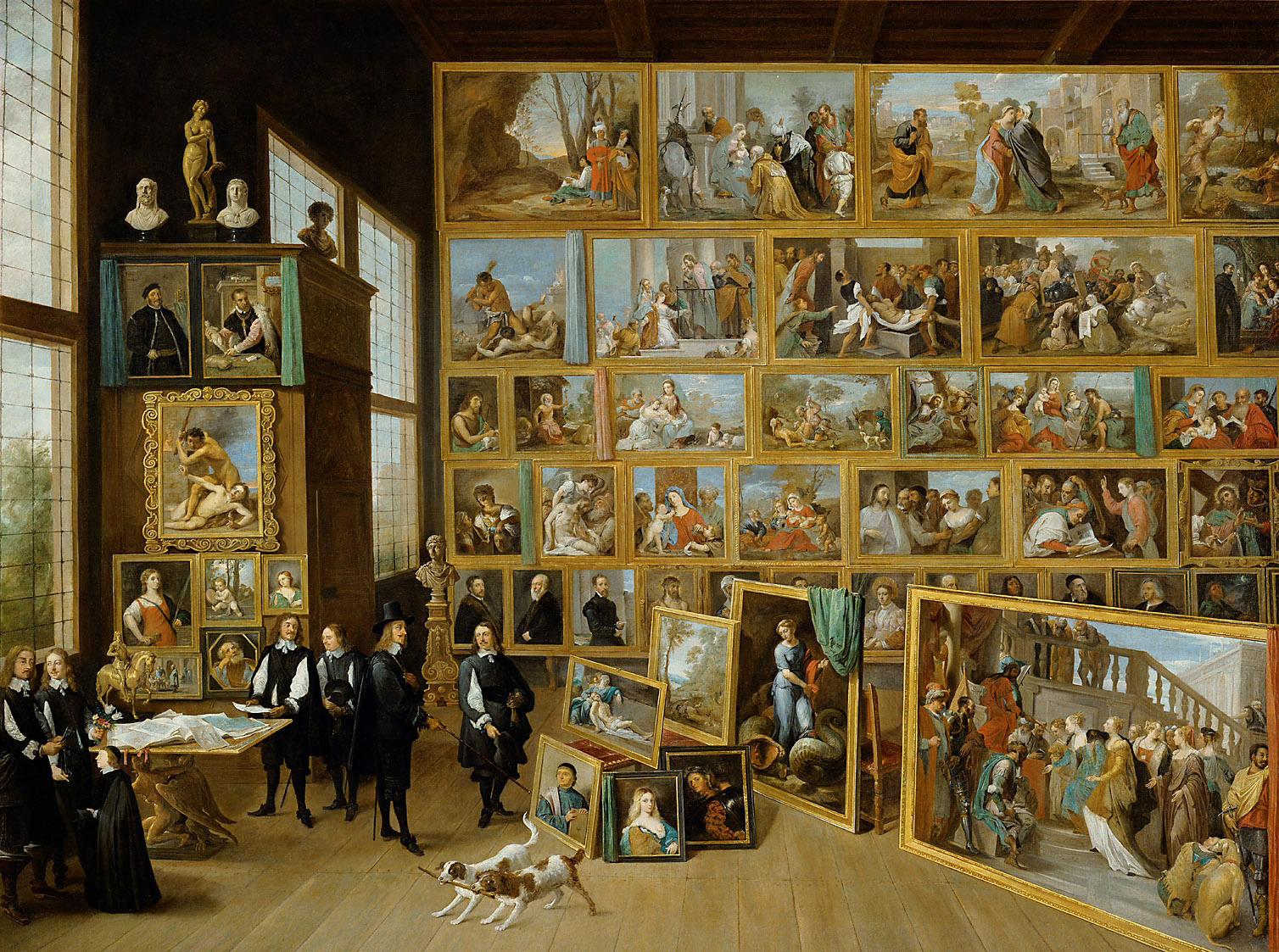
Kunsthistorisches Museum

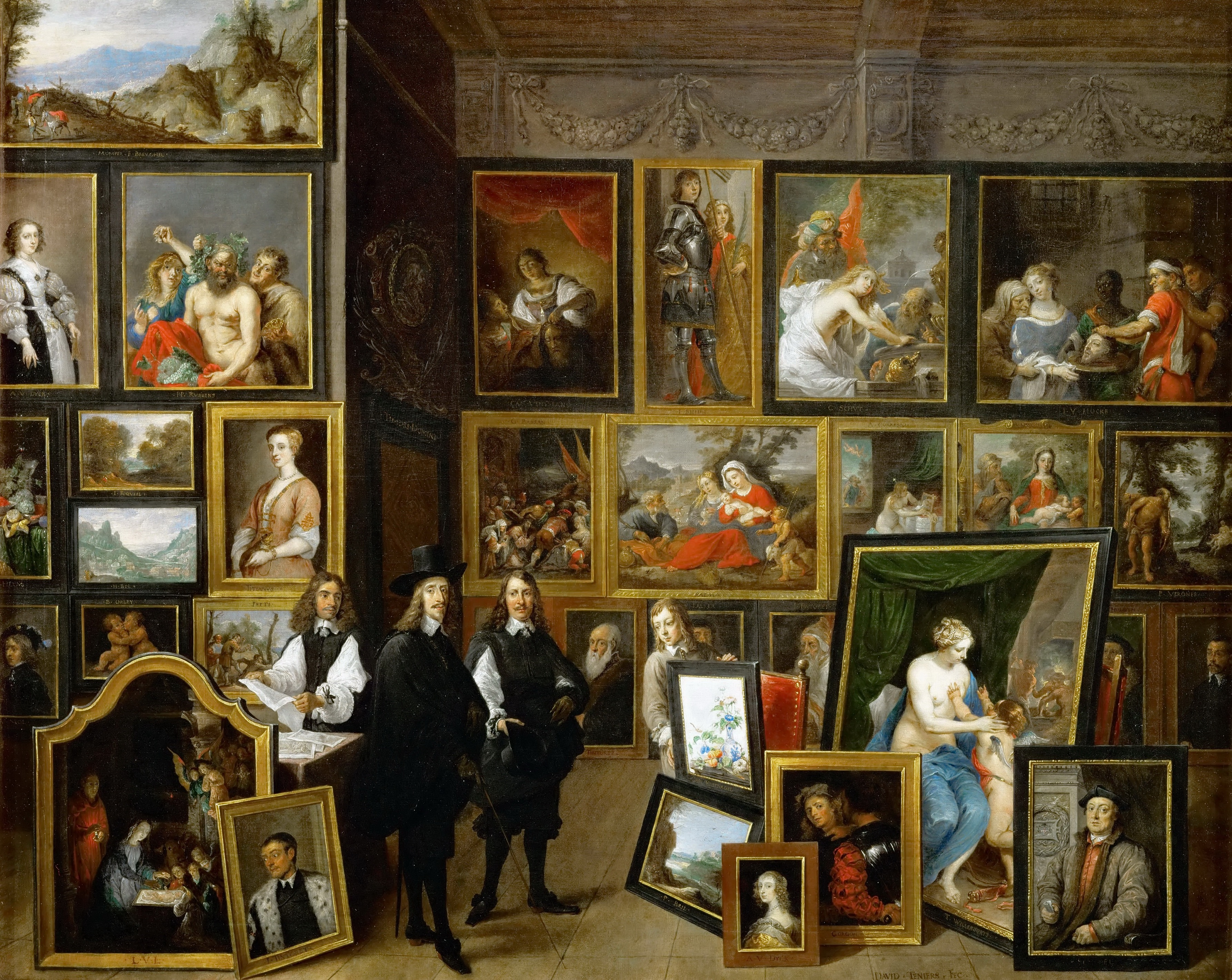
Gallery of Archduke Leopold Wilhelm in Brussels (Vienna), Kunsthistorisches Museum

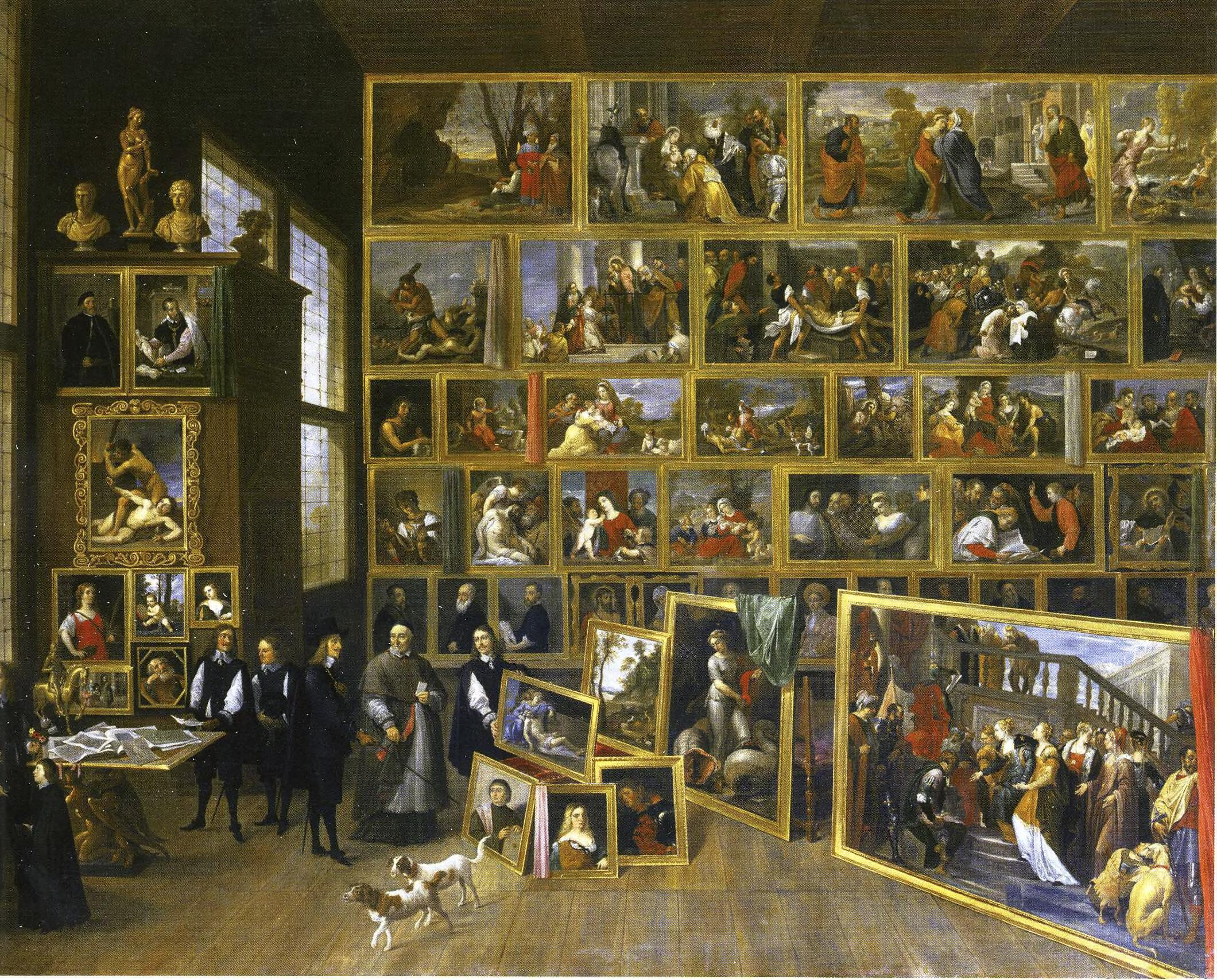
Gallery of Archduke Leopold Wilhelm in Brussels (Petworth), Petworth House

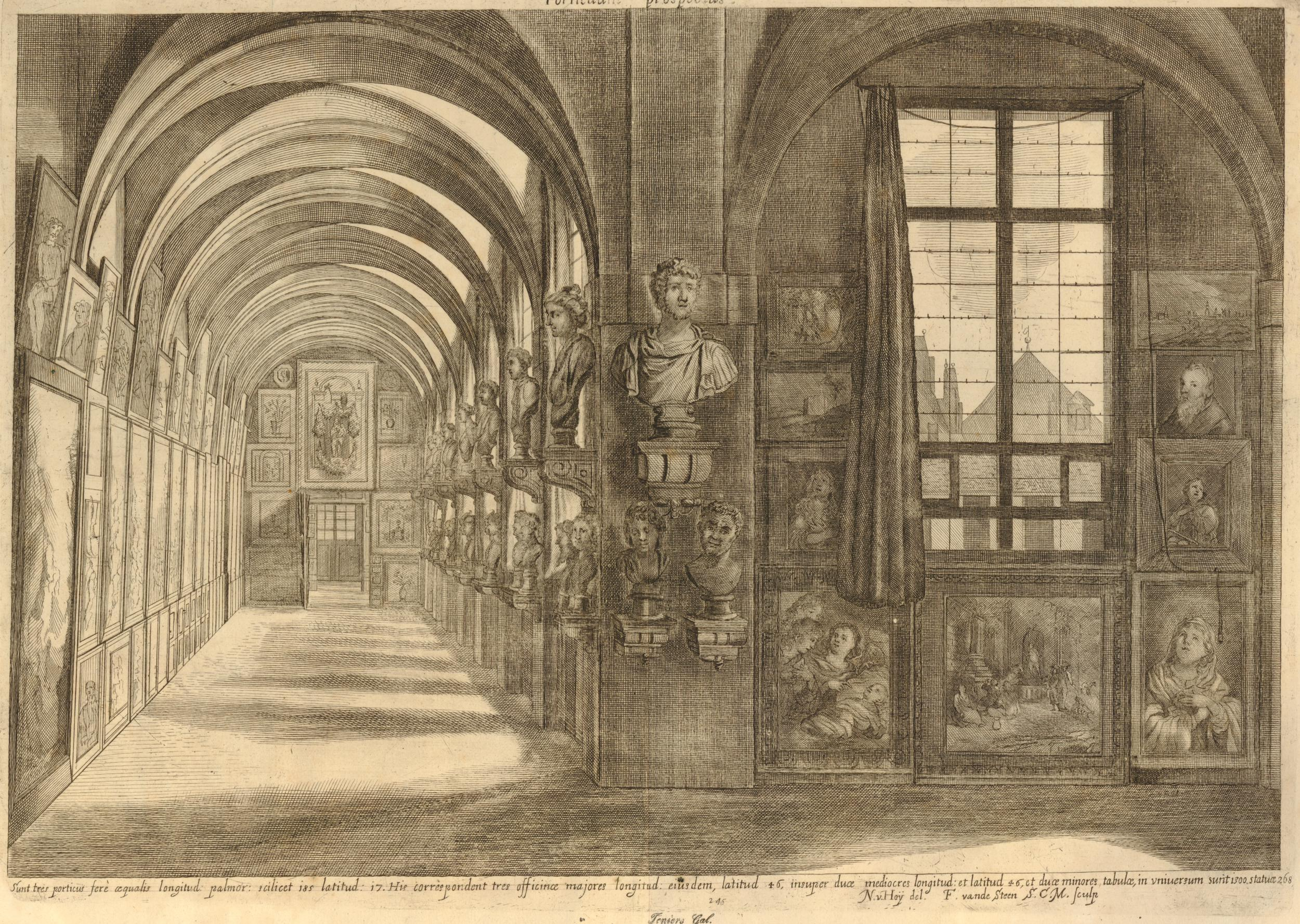
View into the picture gallery of the Archduke Leopold, by Nicolas van Hoey in Teniers' catalog of paintings in 1673

== Charles VI ==
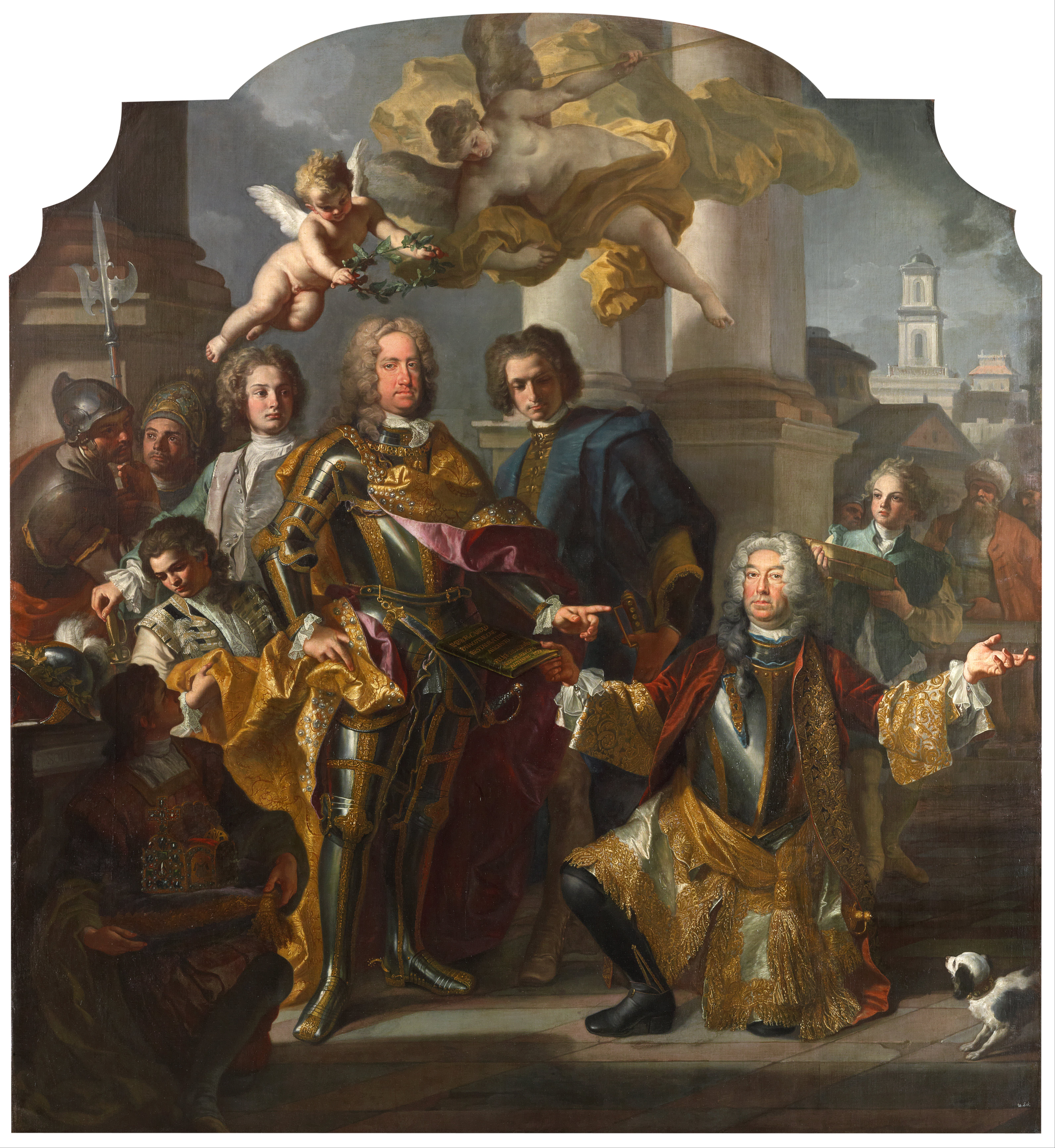
Emperor Charles VI presented with a new catalog from Gundacker, Count Althann, by Francesco Solimena, 1728

After Teniers, Anton Joseph von Prenner was the next to make an illustrated catalog of the paintings there in the 1720s, which included the additions of the Naples collection of Charles VI, Holy Roman Emperor. Charles VI commissioned Ferdinand Storffer to oversee color miniatures as well as engravings for it. The resulting document "The Newly Arranged Inventory of the Imperial Paintings Gallery in the Stallburg" appeared in four volumes from 1720 to 1733. Charles VI also commissioned Francesco Solimena to commemorate the re-arrangement of the gallery with a painting.

The name of the building comes from the horses of the imperial family, who were housed on the ground floor under the reign of Emperor Charles VI. The fountain with wrought iron railings in the middle of the yard was built in 1675. The building was heavily damaged in 1945 just before the end of the Second World War by bombs but was faithfully restored during the years 1947–1948. The passage to the arcades between Hofburg and Stallburg was opened on July 1, 1948.

Today Lipizzaners of the Spanish Riding School are housed there, the associated stud is located in Piber in Styria. From Reitschulgasse one can see the yard. Next to it was the now closed Lipizzan Museum.
