= Prodromus Entomology =

Book about Australian natural history

- Author: John William Lewin (1770–1819)
- Illustrator: John William Lewin
- Language: English
- Subject: Australian Lepidoptera
- Genre: Fine illustrated books
- Publisher: Thomas Lewin, London
- Publication date: 1805
- Publication place: United Kingdom
- Media type: Print, with 18 colour plates
- Dewey Decimal: 595.7809944

Prodromus Entomology is one of the earliest books about Australian natural history, and the first book about Australia containing plates engraved in Australia. The full title of the first edition is Prodromus Entomology. Natural History of Lepidopterous Insects of New South Wales, collected, engraved and faithfully painted after nature.

== History ==
The author and illustrator, John William Lewin, travelled from England to the new British settlement of New South Wales in 1799 (arriving in January 1800), becoming the colony’s first professional artist. His journey was sponsored by wealthy amateur entomologist Dru Drury, who was to be repaid with specimens of new insects. Despite initial delays and distractions, Lewin began his investigations of the natural history in the general vicinity of Sydney, eventually producing illustrated books on moths and birds, of which the Prodromus was the first.

=== First edition ===
The Prodromus was published in 1805 in London. The first edition contains 18 colour plates of moths found in the vicinity of Sydney, with accompanying descriptive and scientific text, with which Lewin was considerably assisted in the identification and classification of the species depicted, by entomologist Alexander Macleay. The moths are shown accurately with the food plants of their larvae, from which they were cultured by the author. Lewin etched the copper plates for the illustrations in Australia and then sent them to his brother Thomas in London for printing. The book was offered for subscription at varying prices for different qualities of plate colouring, and issued in imperial quarto, medium quarto and demy quarto sizes. It was dedicated to The Right Honourable Lady Arden.

=== Later editions ===
After Lewin’s death in Sydney in 1819 and his wife’s return to England, a second edition of the book was issued in demy quarto format, including an additional plate as a frontispiece, with the full title reduced to Natural History of the Lepidopterous Insects of New South Wales, painted after nature. The date on the title page is 1822, though many issues of the second edition were not printed until later, some as late as 1827.

A third, facsimile, edition was published in 2007 by Gaston Renard of Melbourne, limited to 212 copies in the Edition Renard series. As well as the text and illustrations of the early editions, it contains historical, bibliographical and publication notes, a list of the current scientific names of the moths depicted, an appendix with a table indicating the ownership and whereabouts of known surviving copies of the early editions, with acknowledgements to those assisting with the bibliographic research.

== See also ==
- John Lewin
