= Albert von Mensdorff-Pouilly-Dietrichstein =

Austro-Hungarian diplomat

Albert Graf von Mensdorff-Pouilly-Dietrichstein
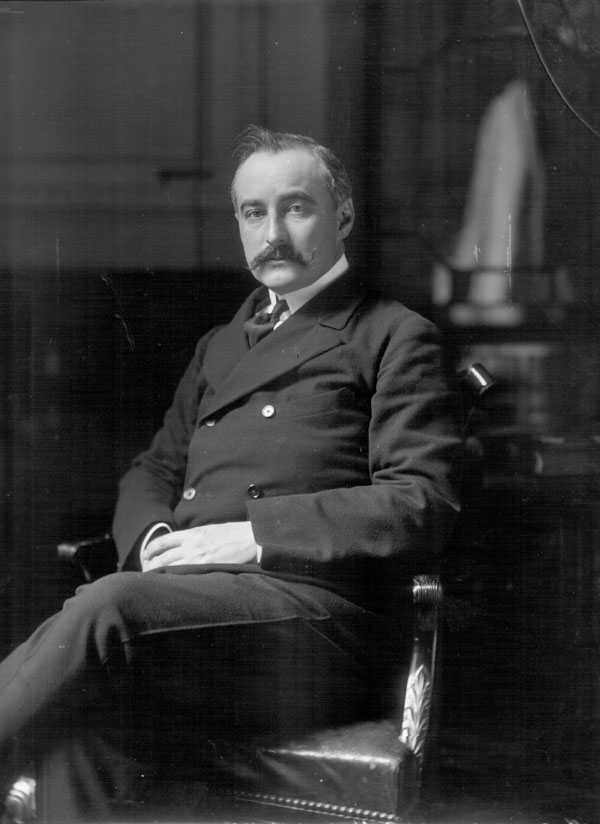
- Mensdorff-Pouilly-Dietrichstein in 1906

Austro-Hungarian Ambassador to the United Kingdom
- In office 28 April 1904 – 13 August 1914
- Preceded by: Franz Count Deym von Stritez
- Succeeded by: None

Personal details
- Born: 5 September 1861 Lemberg, Austria-Hungary (now Ukraine)
- Died: 15 June 1945 (aged 83) Vienna, Austria
- Parent(s): Alexander von Mensdorff-Pouilly, Prince von Dietrichstein zu Nikolsburg; Countess Alexandrine von Dietrichstein-Proskau und Leslie

Albert Viktor Julius Joseph Michael Graf von Mensdorff-Pouilly-Dietrichstein (5 September 1861 – 15 June 1945) was an Austro-Hungarian diplomat who served as Ambassador to London at the outbreak of World War I.

== Early life ==
Born in Lemberg (now Lviv) on 5 September 1861 as the second son of Alexander von Mensdorff-Pouilly, Prince of Dietrichstein-Nikolsburg, a former Austro-Hungarian politician, and his wife Alexandrine (née Countess von Dietrichstein-Proskau und Leslie), heiress of the Princes of Dietrichstein.

By birth, he was a member of House of Mensdorff-Pouilly, an Austrian noble family which originated in Lorraine and had fled the French Revolution in 1790.

He had family connections to the British Royal family, derived through the marriage of his grandfather Count Emmanuel von Mensdorff-Pouilly with Queen Victoria's aunt, Princess Sophie of Saxe-Coburg-Saalfeld; also his father had been a godson and favorite cousin of Queen Victoria's husband, the Prince Consort.

== Career ==
Count von Mensdorff-Pouilly-Dietrichstein entered the Austro-Hungarian foreign service in 1884 and was assigned as an attaché to the embassy in Paris and transferred to London in 1889. His family connections to the British court was soon apparent. He was promoted from First Secretary to Minister Plenipotentiary in February 1903. The Ambassador (Count Deym) died in office in September 1903, and on 6 May 1904 Mensdorff presented his credentials as Ambassador of the Dual Monarchy at the Court of St. James's, a promotion over the heads of many of his seniors that had come at the request of his second cousin King Edward VII of the United Kingdom.

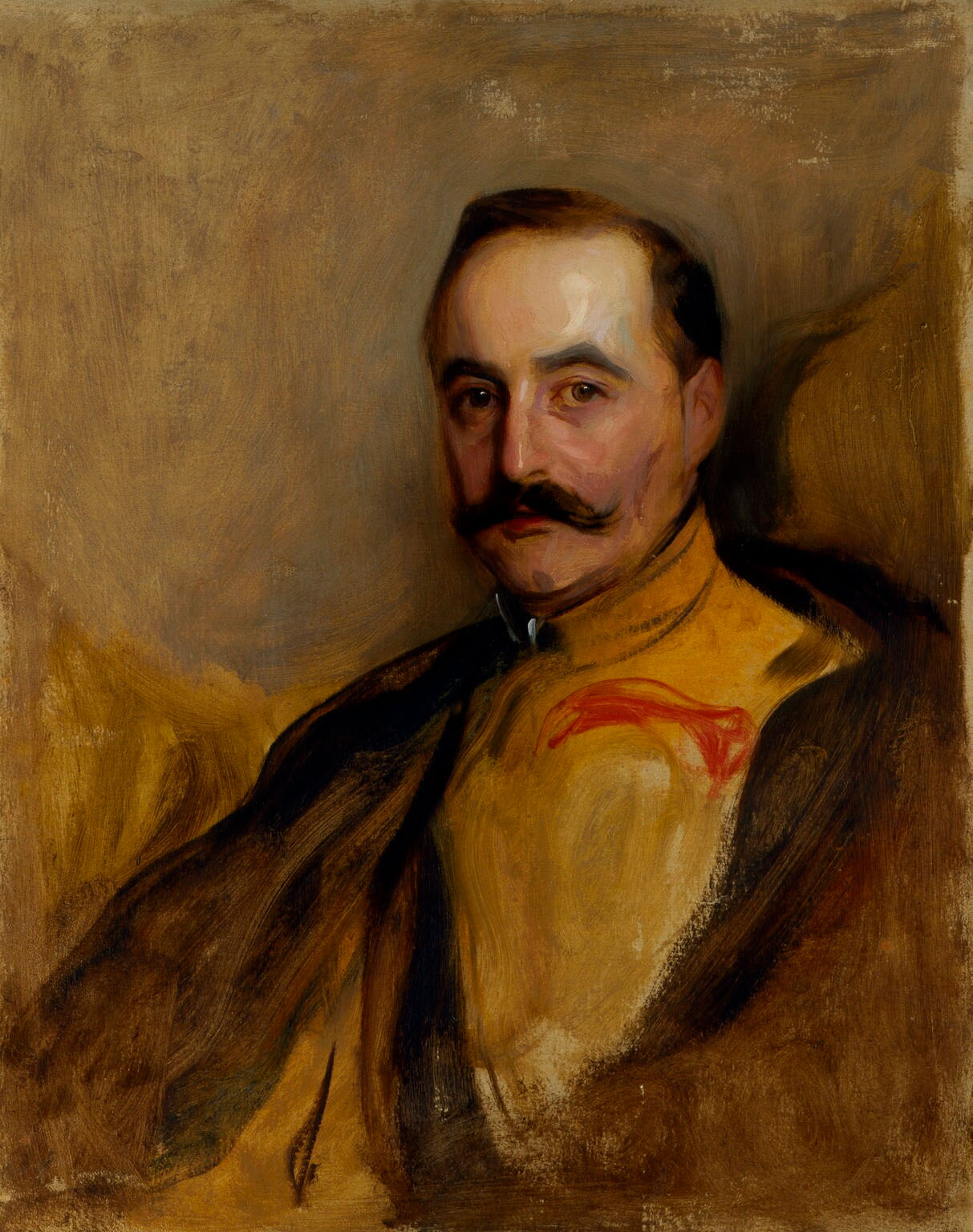
Portrait by Philip de László (c. 1907)

Considered both an effective and popular diplomat in London's aristocratic circles, his family relations and friendship with King Edward VII and his successor George V gave him an entrée to the British court unrivalled by any other diplomat. This contributed to the secure and friendly diplomatic relations between Austria-Hungary and Great Britain before the war.

However, his alleged Anglophilia also brought him a certain mistrust in some circles in Vienna, including Archduke Franz Ferdinand. In the critical negotiations during the July Crisis of 1914, he supported the attempts to avert the danger and correspondence has shown that he was not kept fully informed of his capital's intentions.

War against Austria-Hungary was declared by the United Kingdom on 12 August, whereafter Count von Mensdorff-Pouilly-Dietrichstein left London.

During World War I, Mensdorff-Pouilly was entrusted with several diplomatic missions directed towards the restoration of peace. The most famous one was the meeting with General Jan Smuts in Geneva in December 1917. However, these negotiations proved as fruitless as those which he conducted with the representatives of the Triple Entente in the last days of the Habsburg Monarchy.

In 1917, Mensdorff-Pouilly was appointed to the Upper House (Herrenhaus) and in the following year he was a favourite of the court to replace Count Ottokar Czernin as foreign minister, but he was judged too Anglophile by Berlin.

Although the count retired from active service in 1919, he was appointed the first chief delegate of the Republic of Austria to the League of Nations in 1920. In this capacity, he negotiated the Geneva Protocols in 1922 on a loan for the economic and financial reconstruction of Austria.

His name was once erroneously connected to the Princess Victoria of Wales, his portrait being on the reverse of hers by Philip de László. Albert never married, nor had any known children.

== Death ==
Count Albert von Mensdorff-Pouilly-Dietrichstein died of starvation on 15 June 1945 in Vienna, at the age of 83.

== Honours ==
He received the following orders and decorations:

- Austria-Hungary:
  - Grand Cross of the Imperial Order of Leopold, 1908
  - Commander of the Teutonic Order
- Principality of Bulgaria: Grand Cross of the Order of Saint Alexander
- (Saxe-Coburg and Gotha) (Duchy of Saxe-Altenburg) (Saxe-Meiningen) Ernestine duchies: Grand Cross of the Saxe-Ernestine House Order
- Norway: Grand Cross of the Order of Saint Olav, 26 February 1917
- Ottoman Empire: Order of Osmanieh, 1st Class
- (Duchy of Parma) Parmese Ducal Family: Senator Grand Cross of the Sacred Military Constantinian Order of Saint George
- Russian Empire: Knight of the Order of Saint Anna, 2nd Class
- United Kingdom: Honorary Knight Commander of the Royal Victorian Order, 30 June 1897; Grand Cross, 11 October 1901

== Ancestry ==
Ancestors of Albert von Mensdorff-Pouilly-Dietrichstein

16. Louis Joseph baron de Pouilly et de Chauffour
8. Albert-Louis, Baron de Pouilly et de Chaffour, Comte de Roussy
17. Luce Louise de Hézecques
4. Emmanuel von Mensdorff-Pouilly
18. Comte Francois Joseph de Custine
9. Antoinette Philippine de Custine, comtesse de Roussy
19. Anne Marguerite de Maguin Comtesse de Roussy
2. Alexander von Mensdorff-Pouilly, Prince von Dietrichstein zu Nikolsburg
20. Ernest Frederick, Duke of Saxe-Coburg-Saalfeld
10. Francis, Duke of Saxe-Coburg-Saalfeld
21. Princess Sophie Antoinette of Brunswick-Wolfenbüttel
5. Princess Sophie of Saxe-Coburg-Saalfeld
22. Heinrich XXIV, Count Reuss of Ebersdorf
11. Countess Augusta Reuss of Ebersdorf
23. Countess Karoline Ernestine of Erbach-Schönberg
1. Count Albert von Mensdorff-Pouilly-Dietrichstein
24. Karl Johann Baptist, Prince of Dietrichstein
12. Franz Joseph, Prince of Dietrichstein
25. Countess Maria Christina Josepha of Thun und Hohenstein
6. Joseph Franz, Prince of Dietrichstein
26. Count Andrey Petrovich Shuvalov
13. Countess Alexandra Andrejevna Shuvalova
27. Countess Catharina Pyotrovna Saltykova
3. Alexandrine von Dietrichstein
28. Count John Nepomuck Wratislaw von Mittrowitz
14. Count Josef Anton Wratislaw von Mittrowitz
29. Maria Johanna Malowetz von Malowitz
7. Countess Gabriela Wratislaw von Mittrowitz
30. Count Franz Anton Des Fours zu Mont und Athienville
15. Countess Maria Gabriele Des Fours zu Mont und Athienville
31. Countess Maria Antonia Czernin von und zu Chudenitz

Diplomatic posts
Preceded by Franz Count Deym von Stritez	Austro-Hungarian Ambassador to the United Kingdom; 1904–1914	Succeeded by None
