= Count Franz Philipp von Lamberg =

Austrian soldier and statesman (1791–1848)

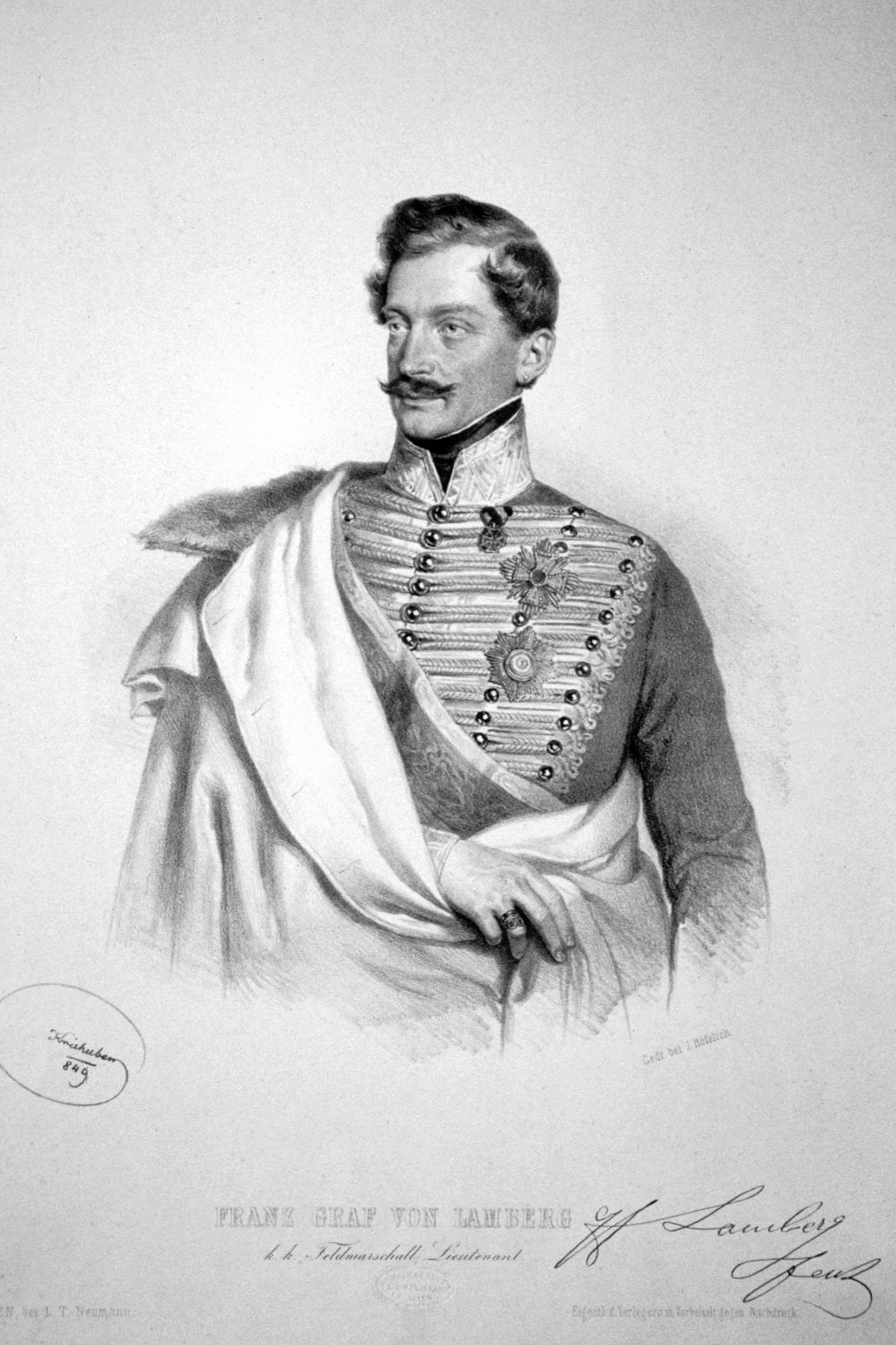
- Count Lamberg on Josef Kriehuber's litography
- Born: 30 November 1791; Mór, Kingdom of Hungary
- Died: 28 September 1848 (aged 56) Budapest, Kingdom of Hungary
- Buried: Mór, Hungary
- Allegiance: Austrian Empire
- Branch: Imperial Austrian Army
- Service years: 1810–1848
- Rank: Field marshal
- Commands: General Headquarters of Hungary
- Spouse: Countess Caroline von Hoyos
- Children: 7

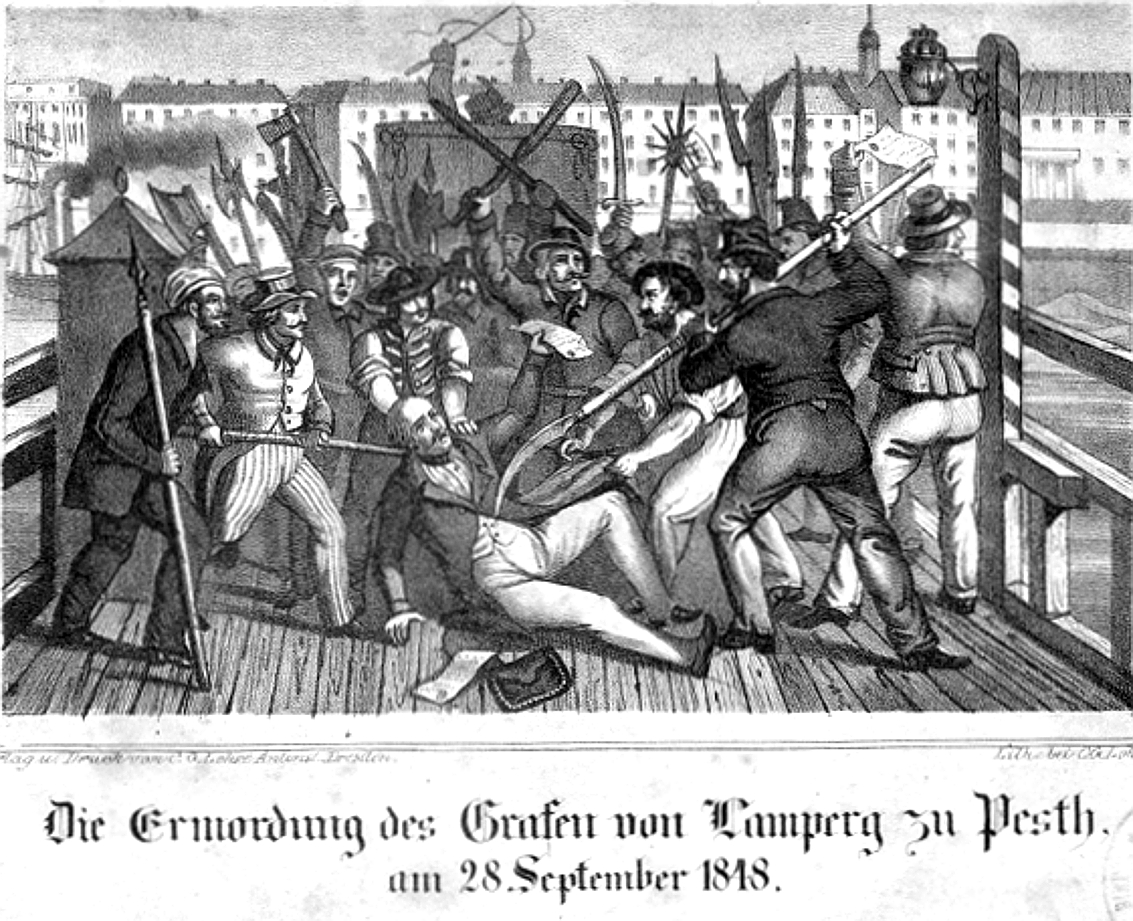
Lynching of von Lamberg in what is now Budapest

Count Franz Philipp von Lamberg (Hungarian: Gróf Lamberg Ferenc Fülöp, 30 November 1791 – 28 September 1848) was an Austrian soldier, statesman, journalist and writer, who held the military rank of field marshal. He had a short but important role in the Hungarian Revolution of 1848.

== Early life and ancestry ==
Franz Philip was the eldest son of Count Philip Joseph von Lamberg (1748–1807), Imperial and Royal Chamberlain and Baroness Borbála Luzsénszky de Luzsna and Reglicze (1771–1843). His maternal grandfather, Baron György Luzsénszky (1721–1773), Hungarian nobleman was owner of extensive lands in Hungary.

== Life ==
Lamberg was born in Mór, Hungary on 30 November 1791. He entered into service in the Imperial Austrian Army in 1810, aged 18 or 19. He was promoted to the rank of major general in 1834 and to the rank of field marshal in 1842. He became the Chief of Staff of the imperial and royal forces stationed in Hungary in 1834.

Aside from his military career, Lamberg also worked as a journalist and writer. His first publications were in the newspaper Hírnök ("Messenger" in Hungarian) in Pozsony (Bratislava, Slovakia), and he wrote multiple books in both German and Hungarian, the most well-known being Another Terra Incognita. Knowledge and Facts About the Non-Hungarian Domains of the Austrian Empire (Még egy Terra Incognita. Ismeretek 's tudnivalók az ausztriai birodalom nem magyar tartományairól), published in 1841 in Pozsony. In 1844, he was considered for a membership in the Hungarian Academy of Sciences.

== Role in the Hungarian Revolution of 1848 ==
In 1848, Lamberg was the commander of the Pozsony division of the Hungarian General Headquarters. When the first independent government of Hungary was formed, and the country was establishing its independent military force, Minister of War Lázár Mészáros asked Lamberg to join, but he refused. In his memoire, Lázár wrote "[Lamberg] was more of an enemy than a friend of the new constitution (...) he expressed the greatest distaste for it".

On 25 September 1848, the Viennese Court appointed Lamberg as the military commander and provisional palatine of Hungary. The appointment had not been previously signed by the Hungarian minister, so the government deemed it invalid on 27 September.

Lamberg arrived in Buda on 28 September to get the signature and take his office. He wished to meet Prime Minister Count Lajos Battyhány, who had already left to meet Lamberg at an army base, where he intended to sign the appointment.

While he was crossing the Chain Bridge, an angered mob frustrated by the approaching Croatian army recognised Lamberg, murdered him, mutilated the body and triumphantly carried its pieces around, impaled on scythes.

Lamberg's death proved a turning point for the revolution, killing all hopes of a peaceful solution. It was one of the reasons for King Ferdinand V to dissolve the Diet of Hungary on 4 October 1848 and appoint Count Josip Jelačić von Bužim, Ban of Croatia and leader of the Croatian army as the military and civil governor of Hungary.

== Marriage and issue ==
Lamberg married Countess Caroline Hoyos von und zu Stichsenstein on 19 April 1828 in Vienna. She was the daughter of Count John Ernest Hoyos (1779–1859), a wealthy landowner, and his wife, Countess Maria Theresia von Schlabrendorf (1781–1862). Together, they had seven children:

- Countess Ernestine von Lamberg (1829–1874), who married Count Antal Szécsen von Temerin (1819–1896), a Hungarian politician
- Countess Caroline von Lamberg (1830–1883), who married Count Alphons von Wimpffen (1828–1866)
- Count Franz Imre von Lamberg (1832–1901), who married Countess Anna Maria von Lamberg (1837–1897)
- Countess Maria Theresia Charlotte von Lamberg (1833–1876), who married as his second wife Count Alphons von Mensdorff-Pouilly (1810–1894), son of Emmanuel von Mensdorff-Pouilly and Princess Sophie of Saxe-Coburg-Saalfeld
- Countess Theresa von Lamberg (1836–1913), who married Franz, Count of Meran (1839–1891)
- Count Philipp von Lamberg (1838–1874), who married Baroness Marie von Wenckheim (1848–1900)
- Count Heinrik von Lamberg (1841–1929), who served as a general of the cavalry and married Princess Eleonore zu Schwarzenberg (1858–1938)
