= Clotilde Apponyi =

Hungarian women's rights activist (1867–1942)

Clotilde Wilhelmine
- Countess Albert Apponyi de Nagy-Aponyi
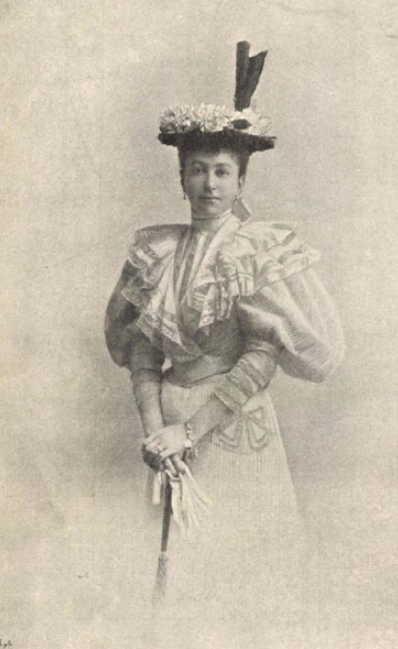
- Countess Clotilde, aged 30
- Born: Klotild Wilhelmine von Mensdorff-Pouilly-Dietrichstein; 23 December 1867
- Died: 1 September 1942 (aged 74)
- Spouse: Albert Apponyi (m. 1897; died 1933)
- Issue: György II Alexander Apponyi; Mária Alexandrina Apponyi; Julianna Apponyi
- House: Mensdorff-Pouilly
- Father: Alexander von Mensdorff-Pouilly
- Mother: Alexandrine von Dietrichstein-Proskau-Leslie

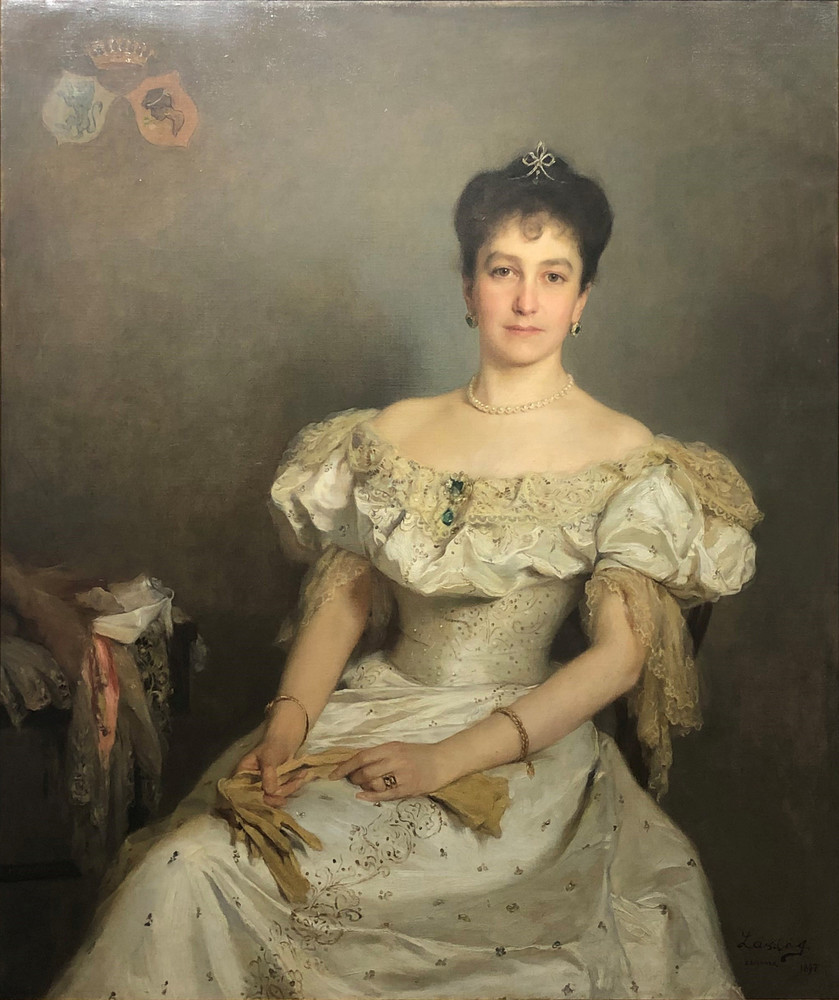
Klothild by Philip de László, (1897)

Countess Clotilde "Klotild" Apponyi de Nagy-Aponyi (née Klothilde Wilhelmine Josepha Gabriele Maria Innocenta von Mensdorff-Pouilly-Dietrichstein; 23 December 1867 – 1 September 1942) was an Austro-Hungarian noblewoman, women's rights activist, politician and a diplomat.

== Early life and ancestry ==
Countess Klothilde Wilhelmine Josepha Gabriele Maria Innocenta was born as a third daughter and youngest child of the Austrian politician Prince Alexander von Dietrichstein-Nikolsburg and his wife, Countess Alexandrine Aline von Dietrichstein-Proskau-Leslie (1824-1906), second daughter and one of the heiresses of Joseph Franz, Prince of Dietrichstein. By birth, she was member of an old Lotharingian House of Mensdorff-Pouilly and through Saxe-Coburg-Gotha blood was related to the British royal family, German Imperial family, Russian Imperial family, as well as to almost all other European Royal families.

== Career ==
Apponyi was president of the Klotild association for the selling of women's work from 1908, president for the alliance of Hungarian women's associations (MNSz) from 1910, board member of the Catholic protection society for women from 1913, president for the Maria Dorotea association for women teachers from 1930, as well as for numerous other charitable associations. As president of the MNSz, she addressed the Hungarian parliament in favor of women's suffrage in 1912, and supported this reform in public in 1918. After World War I, she, as president of the MNSz, became the spokesperson of the non-socialist women's associations of Hungary in oppose to the leftist MANSz under Cécile Tormay. In 1929, she protested against the suggestion to abolish women's right to run for office, and in 1939, she did the same against the suggestion to ban married women from holding office as civil servants.

During World War I, she was an informal diplomat for the Kingdom of Hungary in Switzerland, and she served as a sub-delegate to the League of Nations in Geneva in 1928-34, and as a delegate for Hungary in 1935-37.

== Personal life ==
On 1 March 1897 in Vienna, she married Hungarian politician Count Albert Apponyi de Nagy-Aponyi, second child and only son of Count György Apponyi de Nagy-Aponyi and his wife, Countess Júliane Sztáray de Nagymihály et Sztára (1820-1871). Albert was a leading member of the powerful Hungarian Apponyi family. Together, they were the parents of three children, one son and two daughters:

- Count György II Alexander Mária Antal Apponyi de Nagy-Aponyi (1898–1970), a politician, member of the Parliament, journalist, married in 1923 to Princess Margarete Odescalchi and had issue.
- Countess Mária Alexandrina Angela Apponyi de Nagy-Aponyi (1899–1967), who married Prince Karl of Rohan in 1933 and had issue.
- Countess Julianna Maria Georgina Antonia Apponyi de Nagy-Aponyi (1903–1994), who married Count Ferenc Pálffy of Erdöd in 1924 and had issue. They divorced in 1934 and she married Hungarian nobleman Elemér Klobusiczky de Klobusicz et Zetény in 1943, and had issue. They divorced in 1947.

== Death ==
Countess Clotilde Apponyi died on 1 September 1942, at the age of 74 in Budapest, Hungary.
