= Alexander von Mensdorff-Pouilly, Prince von Dietrichstein zu Nikolsburg =

Austrian general and politician

His Serene Highness Alexander Graf von Mensdorff-Pouilly Fürst von Dietrichstein zu Nikolsburg
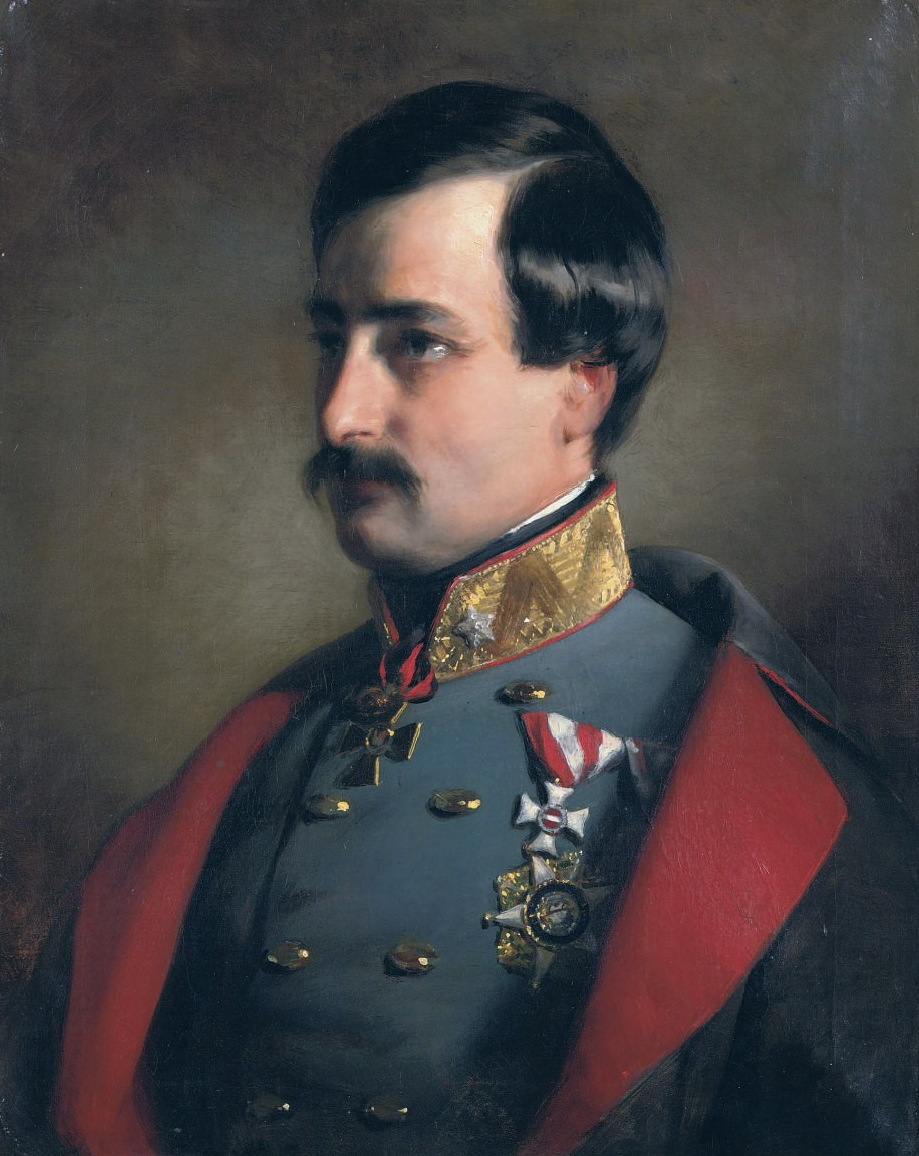
- Portrait by Friedrich von Amerling

4th Chairman of the Austrian Ministers' Conference
- In office 26 June 1865 – 27 July 1865
- Monarch: Francis Joseph I
- Preceded by: Erzherzog Rainer Ferdinand von Österreich
- Succeeded by: Richard Graf von Belcredi

8th Foreign Minister of the Austrian Empire
- In office 27 October 1864 – 30 October 1866
- Preceded by: Johann Bernhard Graf von Rechberg und Rothenlöwen
- Succeeded by: Friedrich Ferdinand Graf von Beust

Personal details
- Born: Alexander Konstantin Albrecht Graf von Mensdorff-Pouilly; 4 August 1813 Coburg
- Died: 14 February 1871 (aged 57)
- Spouse: Alexandrine von Dietrichstein (m. 1857)
- Children: Hugo, 2nd Prince von Dietrichstein zu Nikolsburg; Count Albert von Mensdorff-Pouilly-Dietrichstein; Clotilde Apponyi
- Parent(s): Count Emmanuel von Mensdorff-Pouilly; Princess Sophie of Saxe-Coburg-Saalfeld

Alexander Konstantin Albrecht von Mensdorff-Pouilly, 1st Prince von Dietrichstein zu Nikolsburg (German: Alexander Konstantin Albrecht Graf von Mensdorff-Pouilly, 1. Fürst von Dietrichstein zu Nikolsburg; 4 August 1813 in Coburg – 14 February 1871) was an Austrian general, diplomat and politician, including two years as Minister of Foreign Affairs (1864–66) and one month's service as Minister-President of Austria. He was a cousin of Queen Victoria of the United Kingdom of Great Britain and Ireland and a favorite cousin and childhood playmate of her husband Prince Albert of Saxe-Coburg and Gotha.

== Life and career ==
He was born as a son of Princess Sophie of Saxe-Coburg-Saalfeld and Count Emmanuel von Mensdorff-Pouilly, an army officer who served in the Imperial-Royal Army of the Austrian Empire and held the post of Vice-governor of the Fortress of Mainz. By birth, he was member of the House of Mensdorff-Pouilly, an old Lotharingian noble family, domiciled in Austria since the second half of the 18th century. His maternal grandparents were Francis, Duke of Saxe-Coburg-Saalfeld and his second wife, Countess Augusta Reuss of Ebersdorf. He entered the Austrian army in 1829, and he was promoted to captain in 1836 and major in 1844. In 1848–49, he fought in the First Italian War of Independence and against the Hungarian Revolution of 1848. In 1849, he was promoted to colonel and the following year to major general.

In 1851, Mensdorff-Pouilly was appointed as the Austrian commissioner to Schleswig-Holstein. In 1852, he became the Austrian ambassador to the Russian Empire. He was promoted to Feldmarschallleutnant in 1858. During the Polish Uprising of 1863, he served as the governor of the Kingdom of Galicia and Lodomeria.

=== Foreign minister ===
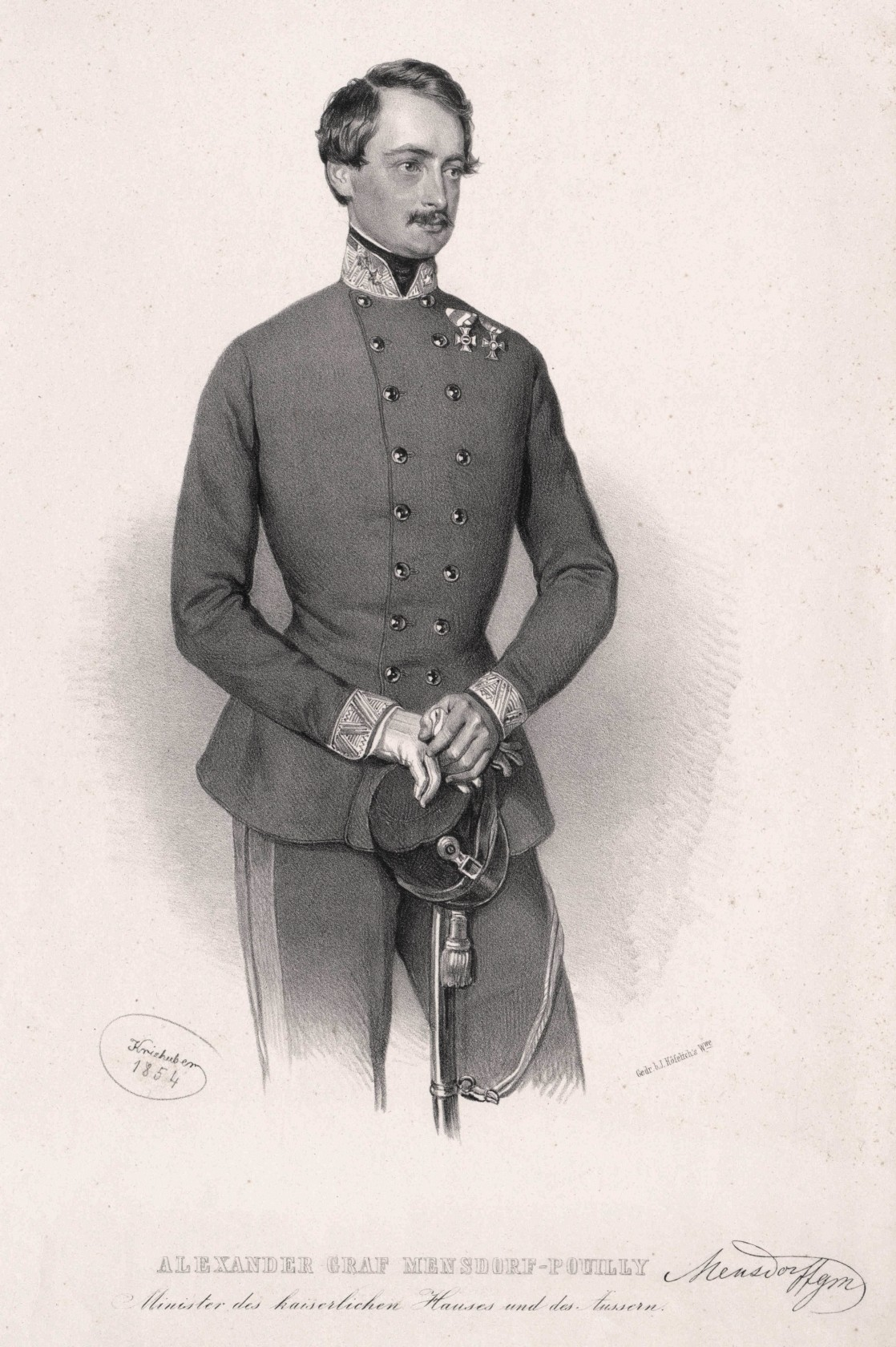
Alexander von Mensdorff-Pouilly, lithograph by Joseph Kriehuber, 1854

Mensdorff-Pouilly was appointed as Foreign Minister of the Austrian Empire on 27 October 1864. Mensdorff-Pouilly's policies during his tenure as Foreign Minister for Emperor Franz Joseph were often largely a continuation of the conservative traditionalism of Count Johann von Rechberg und Rothenlöwen, his predecessor.

Mensdorff-Pouilly, like Rechberg, sought to maintain conservative dominance of the German Confederation through an alliance between an Austrian Empire and the Kingdom of Prussia (in which Prussia was the junior partner), and he steadfastly refused to consider British suggestions that Austria surrender Kingdom of Lombardy–Venetia to the newly created Kingdom of Italy.

After Austria's defeat in the Austro-Prussian War of 1866, Mensdorff-Pouilly resigned his functions in November of that year. After his resignation, he was appointed commanding general in Zagreb and Prague.

== Marriage and children ==
He married Countess Alexandrine Marie Aline von Dietrichstein-Proskau-Leslie (1824–1906), second daughter of Joseph, 9th Prince of Dietrichstein (1798–1858) and his wife, Countess Gabriele Wratislav von Mitrowitz (1804-1880). Together, they had four children, two girls and two boys:

- Marie Gabriele von Mensdorff-Pouilly-Dietrichstein (1858–1889); married in 1887 to Count Hugo Leopold Kálnoky von Köröspatak (1844-1928)
- Hugo, 2nd Prince von Dietrichstein zu Nikolsburg (1858–1920); married in 1892 to Princess Olga Alexandrovna Dolgorukova (1873-1946)
- Count Albert von Mensdorff-Pouilly-Dietrichstein; unmarried
- Clotilde von Mensdorff-Pouilly-Dietrichstein; married in 1897 to Count Albert Apponyi de Nagyappony

Preceded by Archduke Rainer Ferdinand of Austria	Minister-President of Austria; 1865	Succeeded by Count Belcredi
Preceded by Count Rechberg	Minister of Foreign Affairs; 1864–1866	Succeeded by Count Beust
