= Hézecques =

Hézecques Heseke
- Commune
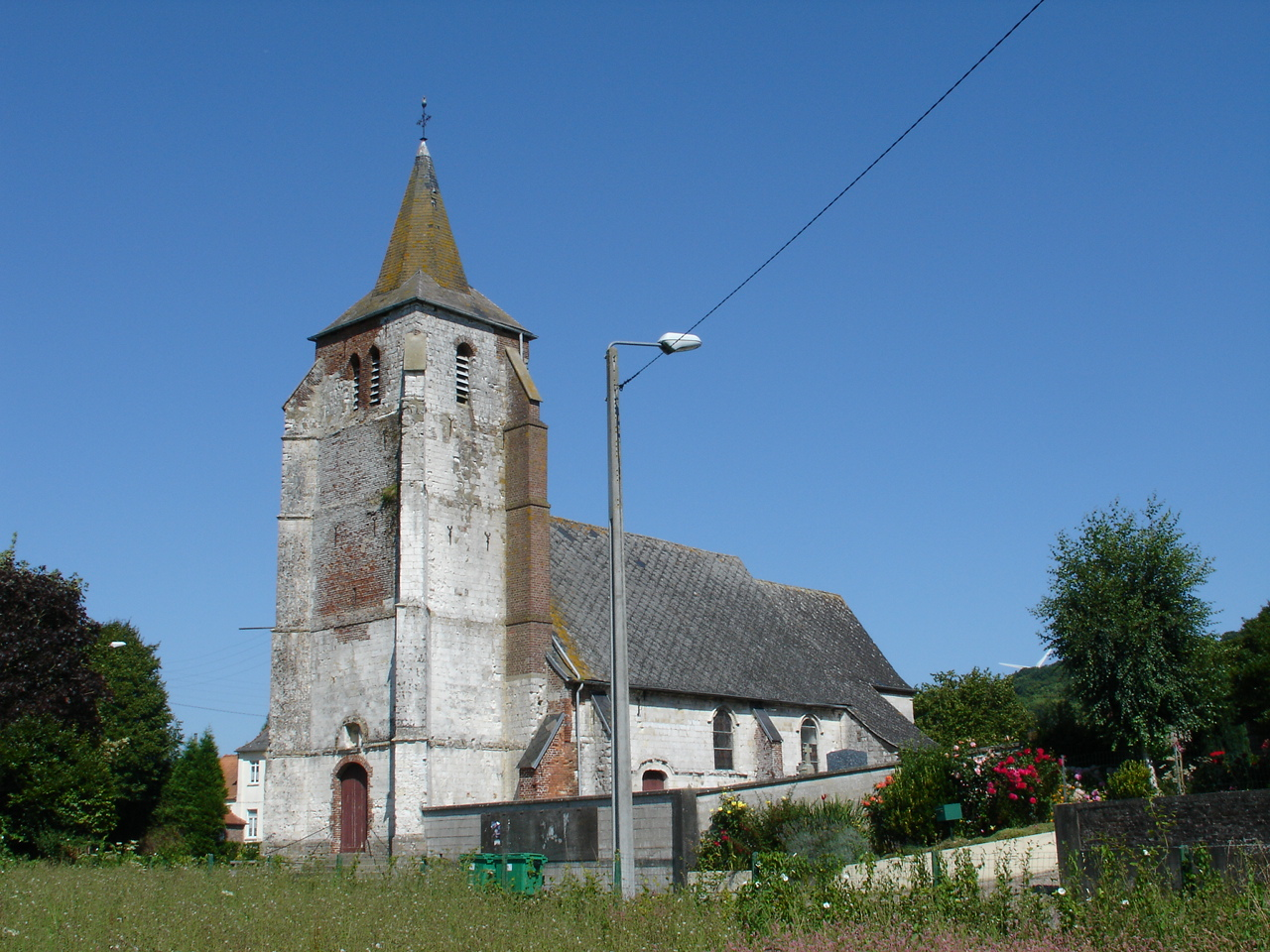
- The church of Hézecques

- Coat of arms
- Location of Hézecques
- Location within France Location within Hauts-de-France
- Coordinates: 50°31′56″N 2°10′51″E
- Country: France
- Region: Hauts-de-France
- Department: Pas-de-Calais
- Arrondissement: Montreuil
- Canton: Fruges
- Intercommunality: CC Haut Pays du Montreuillois

Government
  - Mayor (2020–2026): Gaëtan Puype
- Area^{1}: 4.93 km^{2} (1.90 sq mi)
- Elevation: 84 m (276 ft)
- Highest elevation: 186 m (610 ft)
- Lowest elevation: 78 m (256 ft)
- Population (2023): 127
  - Density: 25.8/km^{2} (66.7/sq mi)
- Time zone: UTC+01:00 (CET)
  - Summer (DST): UTC+02:00 (CEST)
- INSEE/Postal code: 62453 /62310
- ^{1} French Land Register data, which excludes lakes, ponds, glaciers > 1 km^{2} (0.386 sq mi or 247 acres) and river estuaries.

Hézecques (French pronunciation: [ezɛk]; West Flemish: Heseke) is a commune in the Pas-de-Calais department in the Hauts-de-France region of France.

== Geography ==
A small village situated some 20 miles (32 km) northeast of Montreuil-sur-Mer on the D133E1 road.

It is surrounded by the communes Lugy, Beaumetz-lès-Aire and Matringhem. Hézecques is located 25 km southwest of Saint-Omer, the nearest city.

== Population ==
Historical population
Year	Pop.	±% p.a.
1968	138	—
1975	100	−4.50%
1982	109	+1.24%
1990	104	−0.59%
1999	100	−0.43%
2007	120	+2.31%
2012	113	−1.19%
2017	122	+1.54%
2023	127	+0.67%
Source: INSEE

== Places of interest ==
- The church of St.Peter, dating from the sixteenth century.

== See also ==
- Communes of the Pas-de-Calais department
