= Dolní Olešnice =

- Municipality
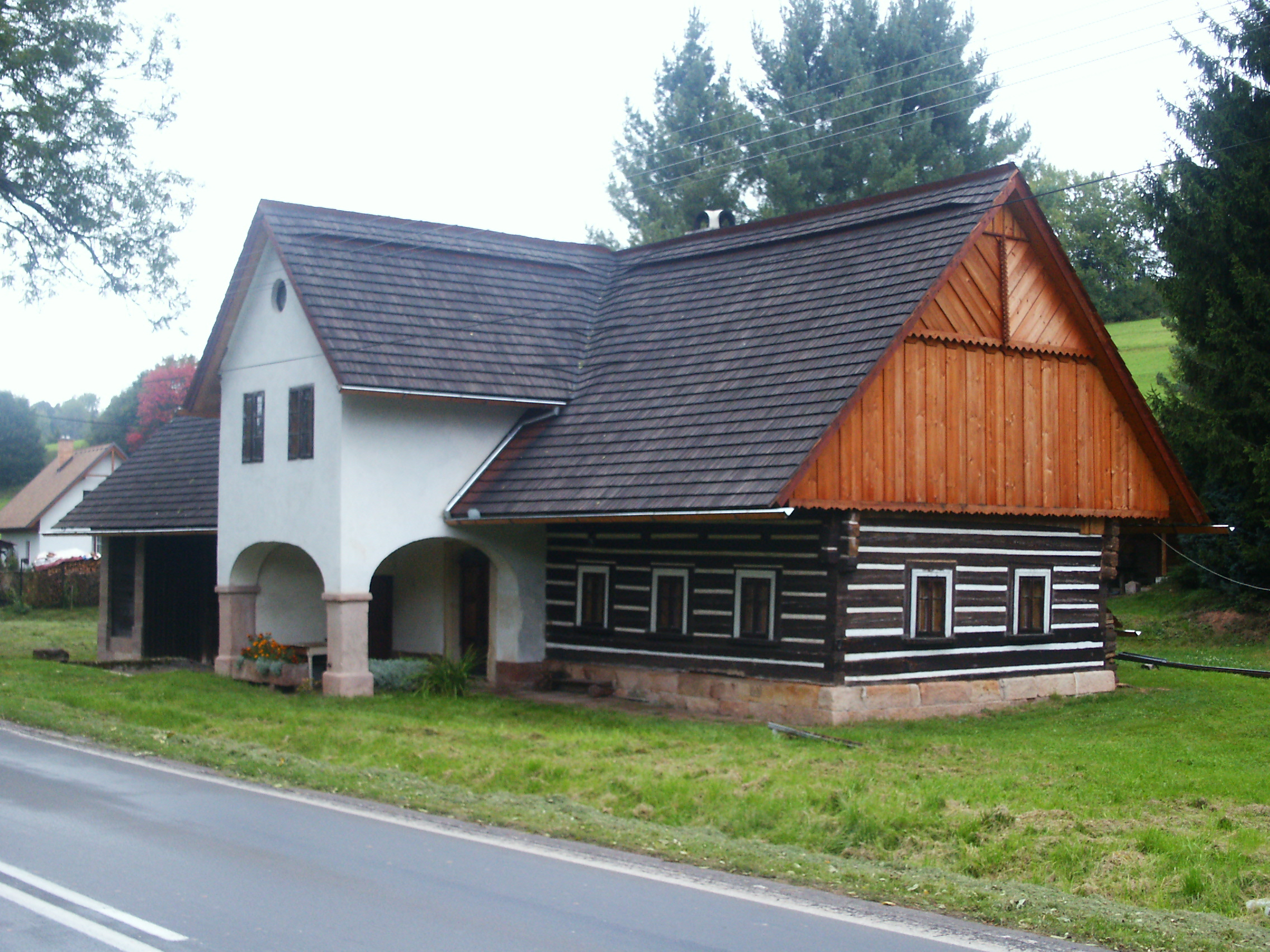
- A typical log house

- Location in the Czech Republic
- Coordinates: 50°31′26″N 15°42′44″E
- Country: Czech Republic
- Region: Hradec Králové
- District: Trutnov
- First mentioned: 1241

Area
  - Total: 12.60 km^{2} (4.86 sq mi)
- Elevation: 346 m (1,135 ft)

Population (2026-01-01)
  - Total: 370
  - Density: 29/km^{2} (76/sq mi)
- Time zone: UTC+1 (CET)
  - Summer (DST): UTC+2 (CEST)
- Postal code: 543 75
- Website: www.dolniolesnice.cz

Dolní Olešnice (German: Nieder Oels) is a municipality and village in Trutnov District in the Hradec Králové Region of the Czech Republic. It has about 400 inhabitants.

== Demographics ==
Historical population
Year	Pop.	±%
1869	1,113	—
1880	1,077	−3.2%
1890	1,095	+1.7%
1900	1,176	+7.4%
1910	1,240	+5.4%
1921	1,130	−8.9%
1930	1,023	−9.5%
1950	638	−37.6%
1961	513	−19.6%
1970	426	−17.0%
1980	359	−15.7%
1991	304	−15.3%
2001	351	+15.5%
2011	347	−1.1%
2021	369	+6.3%
Source: Censuses

== Notable people ==
- Franz Deym (1838–1903), Austrian diplomat
