= Franz Deym =

Austrian diplomat

Franz Deym von Střítež
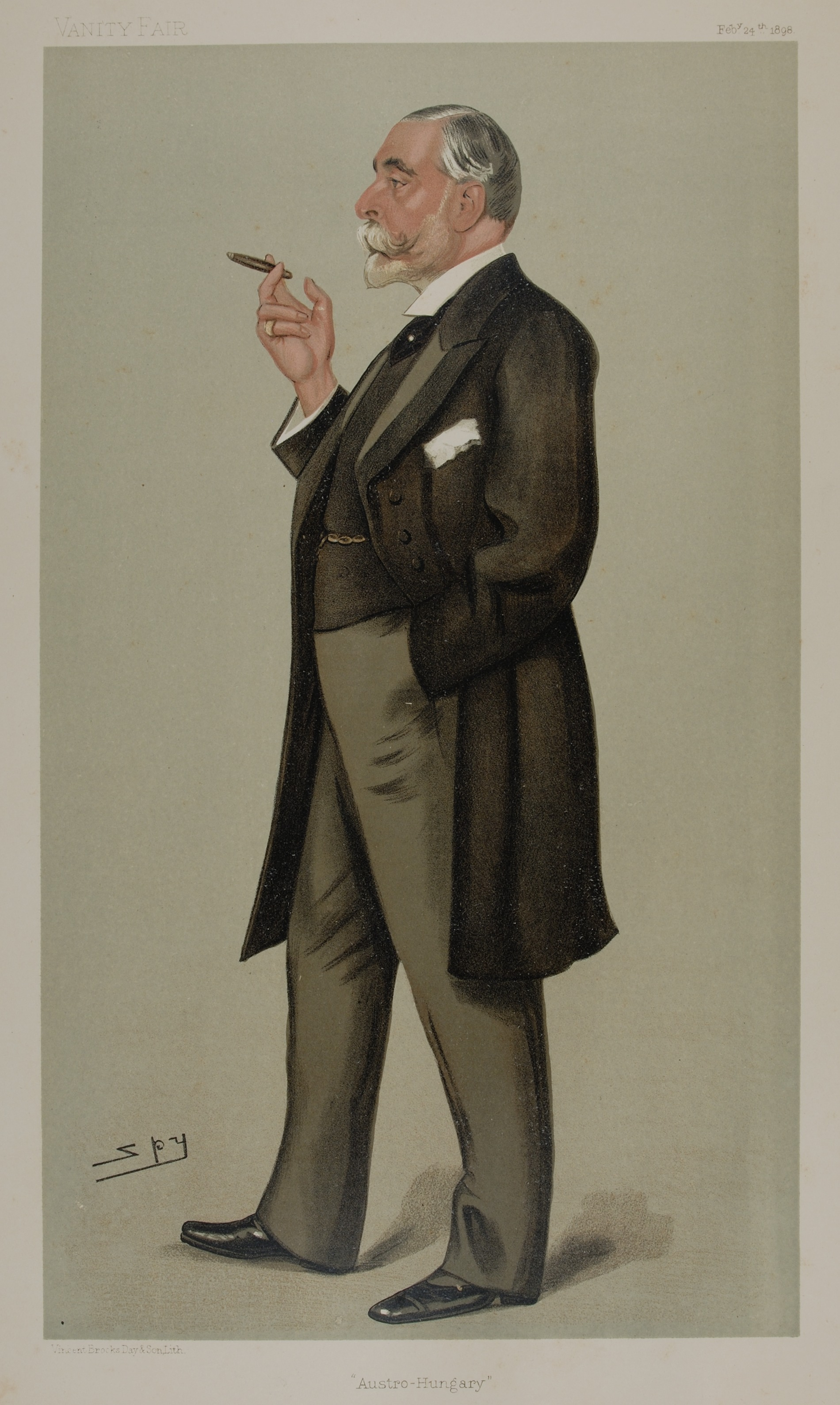
- Ambassador Deym as caricatured by Spy (Leslie Ward) in Vanity Fair, February 1898

Austro-Hungarian Ambassador to the United Kingdom
- Preceded by: Alois Graf Károlyi von Nagykároly
- Succeeded by: Albert von Mensdorff-Pouilly-Dietrichstein

Personal details
- Born: 23 August 1838 Neuschloss (now Dolní Olešnice)
- Died: 3 September 1903 (aged 65) Eckersdorf, Glatz (now Bożków, Kłodzko)

Military service
- Allegiance: Austrian Empire
- Branch/service: Army
- Rank: First Lieutenant
- Unit: Lancers

Count Franz Deym von Střítež (23 August 1838 at Neuschloss (now Dolní Olešnice) – 3 September 1903 at Eckersdorf, Glatz (now Bożków, Kłodzko)) was an Austrian diplomat.

His full title was Franz de Paula Severin Wenzel Maria Philipp Benitius Graf Deym von Střítež.

== Early life and ancestry ==
Born into an old Bohemian noble family, Franz was the eldest child and only son of Count Franz de Paula Deym von Střítež (1804-1872) and his wife, Countess Ludmilla Antonia Franciska Marie Clementine von Waldstein-Wartenberg (1815-1847).

== Career ==
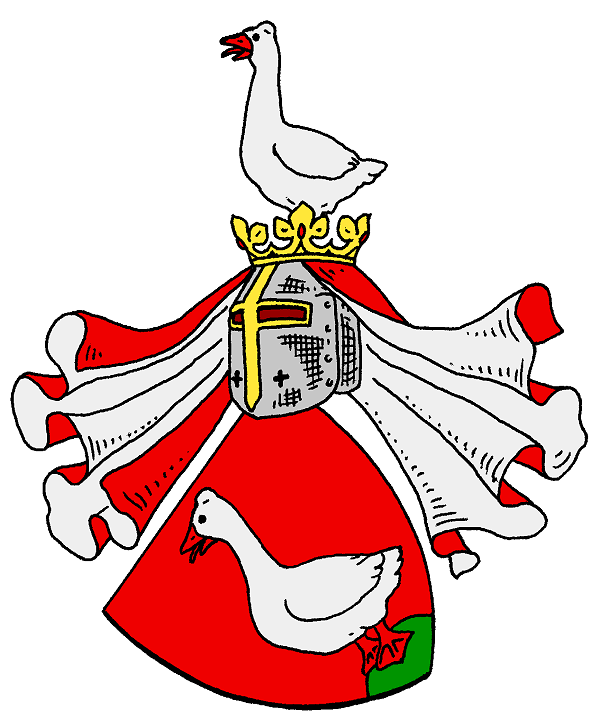
Coat of arms of the Deym family

Deym was the son of a Field Marshal, and was a First Lieutenant in the Lancers.

In 1864 he joined the Diplomatic Service. He was first Attaché then Legationssekretär (Secretary) in Paris, before being sent to the Embassy in Rome.

In 1871 he became the Special Ambassador and Acting Minister for the armed services, and then retired from public life.

In 1879 he became a member of the Austrian Reichsrat, and was re-elected in 1885.

On 18 October 1888 he became Ambassador to London, a position he held until his death.

He was invested as a Knight of the Order of the Golden Fleece, the highest order of Austria-Hungary, in 1900.

== Personal life ==
On 26 February 1870 in Rome, Italy, he married Countess Anna Maria Johanna Nepomucena Josepha von Schlabrendorff (1852-1919), younger daughter of Count Constantin Carl Bernhard Anton Johann Nepomuk von Schlabrendorff (1812-1858) and his wife, Countess Bianca Olympia Georgine von Pückler-Groditz (1826-1870). They had three children, one son and two daughters:

- Count Franz de Paula Deym von Střítež (1871-1925), married to Countess Maria de la Fontaine und d'Harnoncourt-Unverzagt (1881-1949) and had issue
- Countess Bianca Maria Ludmila Friederike Deym von Střítež (1874-1968), married to Count Anton von Magnis (1862-1944) and had issue
- Countess Isabella Deym von Střítež (1877-1960), married to Count Paul Esterhazy von Galantha (1861-1932), no issue

== Sources ==
- Friedrich Graf Deym und die österreichische Frage in der Paulskirche (in German). Leipzig: Breitkopf & Härtel. 1891.
- "Deym Střítež of Franz Graf". Austrian Biographical Dictionary, 1815-1950 (OBL) (PDF) (in German). Vol. 1. Vienna: Austrian Academy of Sciences. p. 182.
