= Lugy =

- Commune
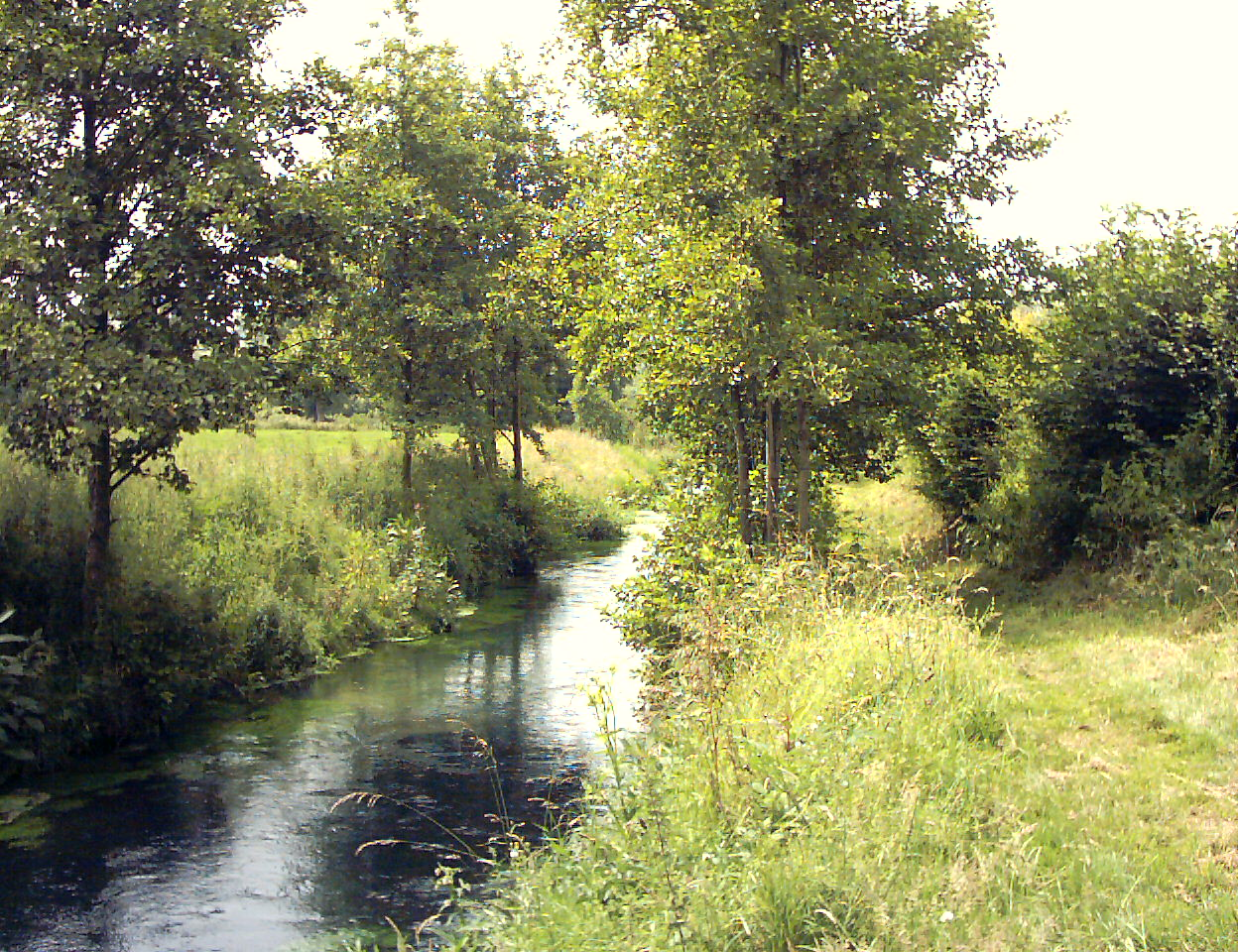
- The river Lys

- Coat of arms
- Location of Lugy
- Location within France Location within Hauts-de-France
- Coordinates: 50°31′29″N 2°10′32″E
- Country: France
- Region: Hauts-de-France
- Department: Pas-de-Calais
- Arrondissement: Montreuil
- Canton: Fruges
- Intercommunality: CC Haut Pays du Montreuillois

Government
  - Mayor (2020–2026): Freddy Van Latenstein
- Area^{1}: 2.83 km^{2} (1.09 sq mi)
- Elevation: 90 m (300 ft)
- Highest elevation: 168 m (551 ft)
- Lowest elevation: 81 m (266 ft)
- Population (2023): 140
  - Density: 49/km^{2} (130/sq mi)
- Time zone: UTC+01:00 (CET)
  - Summer (DST): UTC+02:00 (CEST)
- INSEE/Postal code: 62533 /62310
- ^{1} French Land Register data, which excludes lakes, ponds, glaciers > 1 km^{2} (0.386 sq mi or 247 acres) and river estuaries.

Lugy (French pronunciation: [lyʒi]) is a commune in the Pas-de-Calais department in the Hauts-de-France region of France 16 miles (25 km) northeast of Montreuil-sur-Mer.

== Population ==
Historical population
Year	Pop.	±% p.a.
1968	135	—
1975	127	−0.87%
1982	96	−3.92%
1990	110	+1.72%
1999	110	+0.00%
2007	137	+2.78%
2012	145	+1.14%
2017	147	+0.27%
2023	140	−0.81%
Source: INSEE

== See also ==
- Communes of the Pas-de-Calais department
