= Emmanuel von Mensdorff-Pouilly =

Count of Mensdorff-Pouilly (1777–1852)

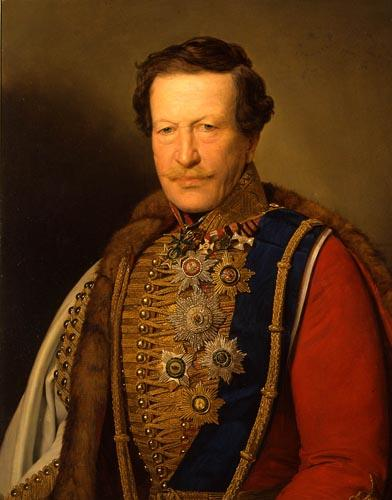
Mensdorff-Pouilly in 1839

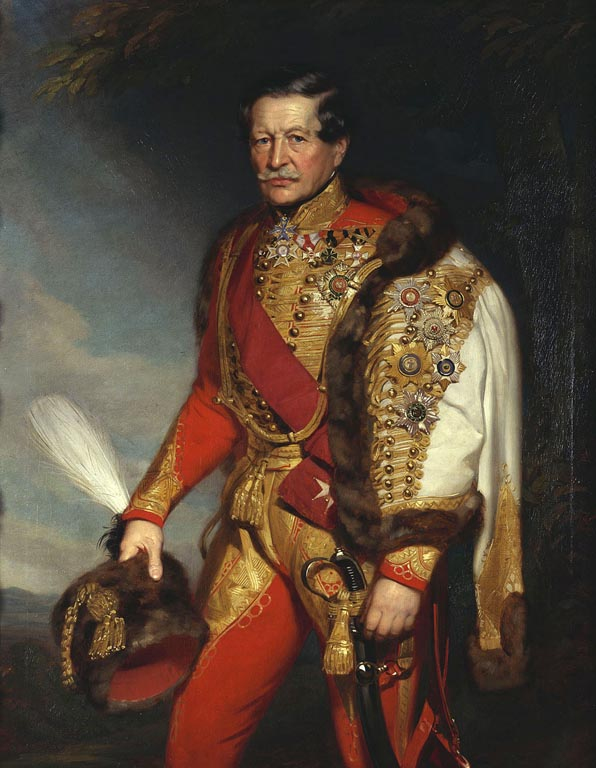
Portrait in 1842

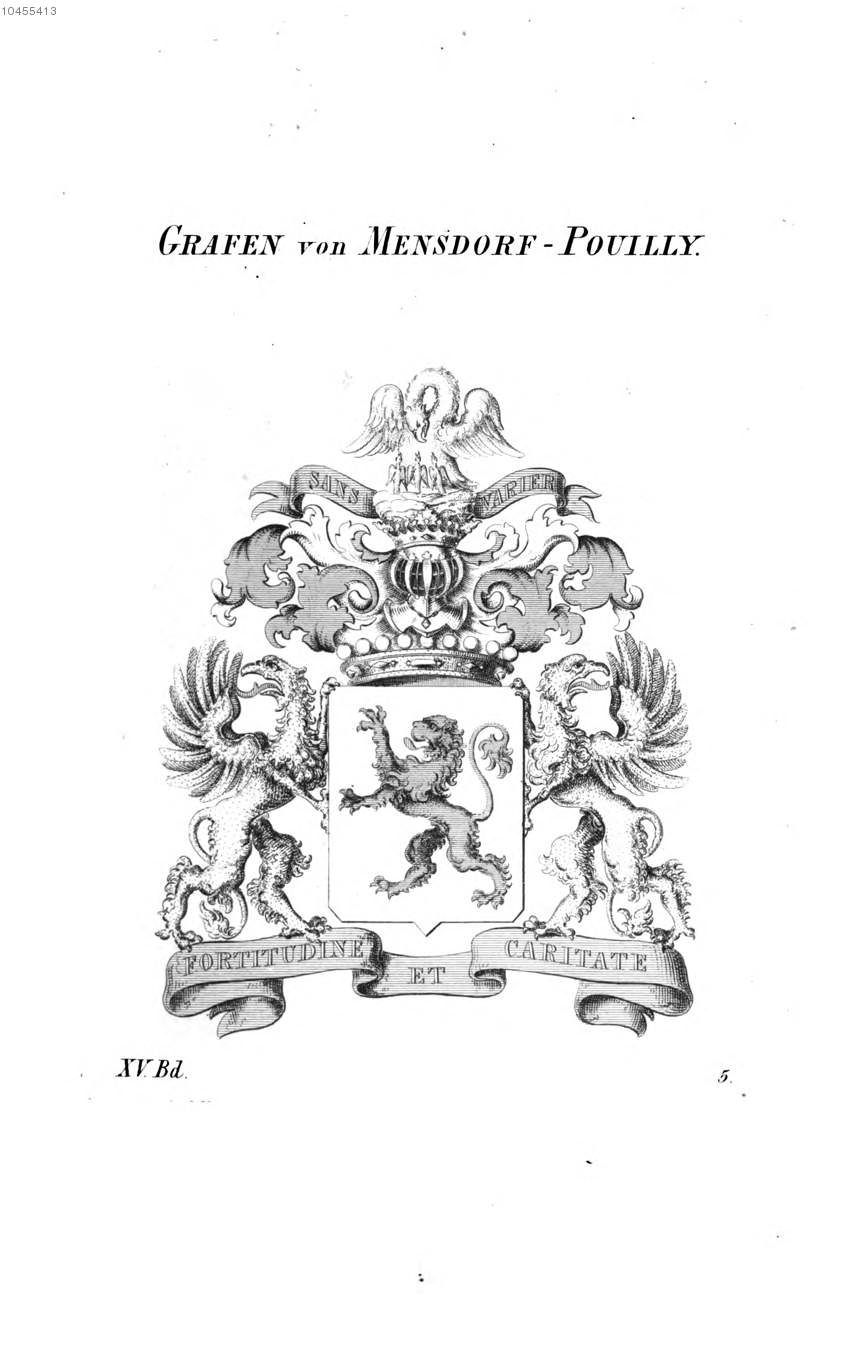
Arms of the Count von Mensdorff-Pouilly

Emmanuel Graf von Mensdorff-Pouilly (24 January 1777 – 28 June 1852) was an army officer in the Imperial-Royal Army of the Austrian Empire, and vice-governor of Mainz. He was the uncle of Queen Victoria and the godfather of her husband, Prince Albert of Saxe-Coburg and Gotha.

== Life and career ==
The House of Mensdorff-Pouilly originated from the barony of Pouilly in Stenay, on the river Meuse in Lorraine. Albert-Louis, Baron de Pouilly et de Chaffour, Comte de Roussy (1731–1795) and his wife, Marie Antoinette de Custine (1746–1800) emigrated together with their children during the French Revolution. Their sons, Albert (1775–1799) and Emmanuel (baptised at Nancy on 24 January 1777), took the name Mensdorff from a community in the county of Roussy, Luxembourg.

The brothers entered military service against revolutionary and Napoleonic France, and Albert was killed in battle in 1799. At the start of the War of the Fifth Coalition, Emmanuel held the rank of major. On 13 April 1809, he was wounded while leading a company of the 8th Jäger in action near Amberg. By 23 April, he had recovered enough to partake in the cavalry battles at the start of the Battle of Ratisbon. He was decorated with the Military Order of Maria Theresa for his services in the war.

In 1810, he was given command of the Galician regiment of Uhlans „Erzherzog Carl“ Nr. 3. Serving as a commander of a cavalry brigade in Bohemia, Mensdorff-Pouilly became commander of the Fortress of Mainz. From 1829 to 1834, Mensdorff-Pouilly also served as vice-governor of Mainz.

After again having served in Bohemia, Mensdorff-Pouilly became vice-president of the Hofkriegsrat in 1840. He retired from the army in 1848 with the rank of feldmarschallleutnant. During the Revolutions of 1848, Mensdorff-Pouilly was sent as a commissioner to Prague, where he tried in vain to impress on the Prince of Windisch-Grätz the necessity to avoid bloodshed.

== Family ==
Emmanuel von Mensdorff-Pouilly married Princess Sophie of Saxe-Coburg-Saalfeld, eldest daughter of Francis, Duke of Saxe-Coburg-Saalfeld, on 22 February 1804 at Coburg. Through this marriage, he was the brother-in-law of King Leopold I of Belgium and the uncle of both Queen Victoria and Prince Albert of the United Kingdom, and of King Ferdinand II of Portugal.

Emmanuel and Sophie had six sons:

- Hugo Ferdinand (1806–1847)
- Alphons (1810–1894), Count von Mensdorff-Pouilly, ∞ 1. 1843 Countess Therese von Dietrichstein-Proskau-Leslie (1823–1856), ∞ 2. 1862 Countess Maria Thersia von Lamberg (1833–1876), daughter of Count Franz Philipp von Lamberg.
- Alfred Carl (1812–1814).
- Alexander (1813–1871), Fürst von Dietrichstein zu Nikolsburg (1868), was Austrian Foreign Minister and Prime Minister of Austria in the 1860s, ∞ 1857 Countess Alexandrine Maria von Dietrichstein-Proskau-Leslie (1824–1906)
- Leopold Emanuel (1815–1832)
- Arthur August (1817–1904), ∞ 1. 1853 (div. 1882) Magdalene Kremzow (1835–1899), ∞ 2. 1902 Countess Bianca Albertina von Wickenburg (1837–1912)

Emmanuel was created Graf (Count) von Mensdorff-Pouilly on 29 November 1818 in Vienna. In 1838, he purchased Schloss Preitenstein in the Plzeň Region of Bohemia, which remained the property of the Mensdorff-Pouilly family until 1945.

== Honours ==
He received the following orders and decorations:

- Austrian Empire:
  - Knight of the Military Order of Maria Theresa, 1809
  - Grand Cross of the Imperial Order of Leopold
- Belgium: Grand Cordon of the Order of Leopold, 13 March 1845
- (Saxe-Coburg and Gotha) (Duchy of Saxe-Altenburg) (Saxe-Meiningen) Ernestine duchies: Grand Cross of the Saxe-Ernestine House Order, March 1834
- Kingdom of Prussia:
  - Pour le Mérite, 9 October 1813
  - Knight of the Black Eagle, 30 September 1846
  - Knight of the Red Eagle, 1st Class, in Diamonds
  - Knight of the Prussian Order of St. John
- Kingdom of Saxony: Commander of the Military Order of St. Henry, 1st Class, 1816
- United Kingdom: Honorary Grand Cross of the Bath (military), 30 May 1842
- Russian Empire:
  - Knight of St. George, 4th Class, 12 May 1814
  - Knight of St. Alexander Nevsky
  - Knight of St. Anna, 2nd Class
  - Knight of St. Vladimir, 3rd Class
  - Knight of the White Eagle

== Literature ==
- Eddie de Tassigny: Les Mensdorff-Pouilly. Le destin d'une famille émigrée en 1790. Paris: Le Bois d’Hélène, 1998.
