= Mensdorff-Pouilly family =

Mensdorff-Pouilly
- Parent family: Pouilly
- Origin: Pouilly-sur-Meuse
- Founder: Emmanuel von Mensdorff-Pouilly
- Titles: Prince von Dietrichstein zu Nikolsburg; Count von Mensdorff-Pouilly
- Estate: Mikulov Castle (Nikolsburg)
- Dissolution: 1964 (princely branch)

Coat of Arms of the Pouilly family, branch of Awamey of the lords of Pouilly, that also settled in Luxembourg

The Mensdorff-Pouilly family is an old aristocratic family originally from Lorraine, whose members can trace back their noble lineage back to 1397. The family derived its name from the barony of Pouilly at Stenay in Meuse.

== History ==
In 1790, during the French Revolution, Albert Louis de Pouilly (1731–1795), member of an old French nobility dating back to 14th century, emigrated with his family. His sons Albert and Emmanuel changed the family name to Mensdorff-Pouilly, which refers to a village in the county of Roussy in Luxembourg.

Apart from already holding the title of Comte in the Nobility of France, received in 1760 by Louis XV, the family added another title in the Austrian Empire, after escaping the French Revolution. In 1808, the family was incorporated into the Austrian nobility. Emmanuel von Mensdorff-Pouilly received an Austrian comital title from the Emperor Francis I, and he was recognized as noble in Bohemia (the Inkolat) in 1839. Through Emmanuel's wife, Princess Sophie of Saxe-Coburg-Saalfeld, the family is closely related to the royal families of Belgium, Sweden, Portugal, Bulgaria and the United Kingdom.

As a result of the marriage of Count Alexander von Mensdorff-Pouilly with Alexandrine von Dietrichstein (1824–1906), daughter of Joseph Franz, Prince of Dietrichstein, Alexander changed his branch's name to Mensdorff-Pouilly-Dietrichstein. He received the hereditary title of Prince von Dietrichstein zu Nikolsburg in 1868 from Franz Joseph I of Austria.

The princely branch of the family died out with the death of Alexander, Prince von Dietrichstein zu Nikolsburg (1899-1964), but the comital line still exists. The family motto is Fortitudine et caritate.

== Notable members ==
- Count Emmanuel von Mensdorff-Pouilly (1777–1852), Vice Governor of the Fortress of Mainz.
  - Princess Sophie of Saxe-Coburg-Saalfeld (1778–1835), wife of Emmanuel and sister of both King Leopold I of Belgium and Princess Victoria of Saxe-Coburg-Saalfeld, thus the aunt of Queen Victoria of the United Kingdom.
- Alexander von Mensdorff-Pouilly, Prince von Dietrichstein zu Nikolsburg (1813–1871), son of Emmanuel and Sophie; Austrian Foreign Minister (1864–1866).
- Count Albert von Mensdorff-Pouilly-Dietrichstein (1861–1945), younger son of Alexander; Austrian diplomat.
- Countess Clotilde von Mensdorff-Pouilly-Dietrichstein (1867–1942), daughter of Prince Alexander
- Count Alfons Mensdorff-Pouilly (born 1948), Czech animator.

== Gallery ==
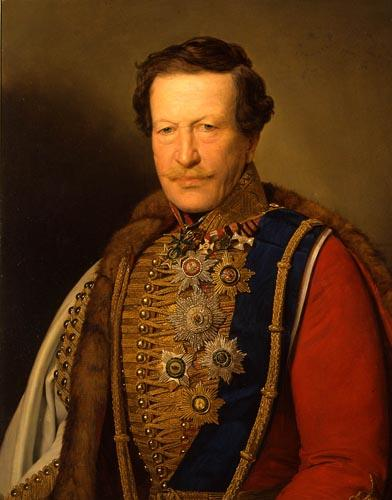
Emmanuel von Mensdorff-Pouilly

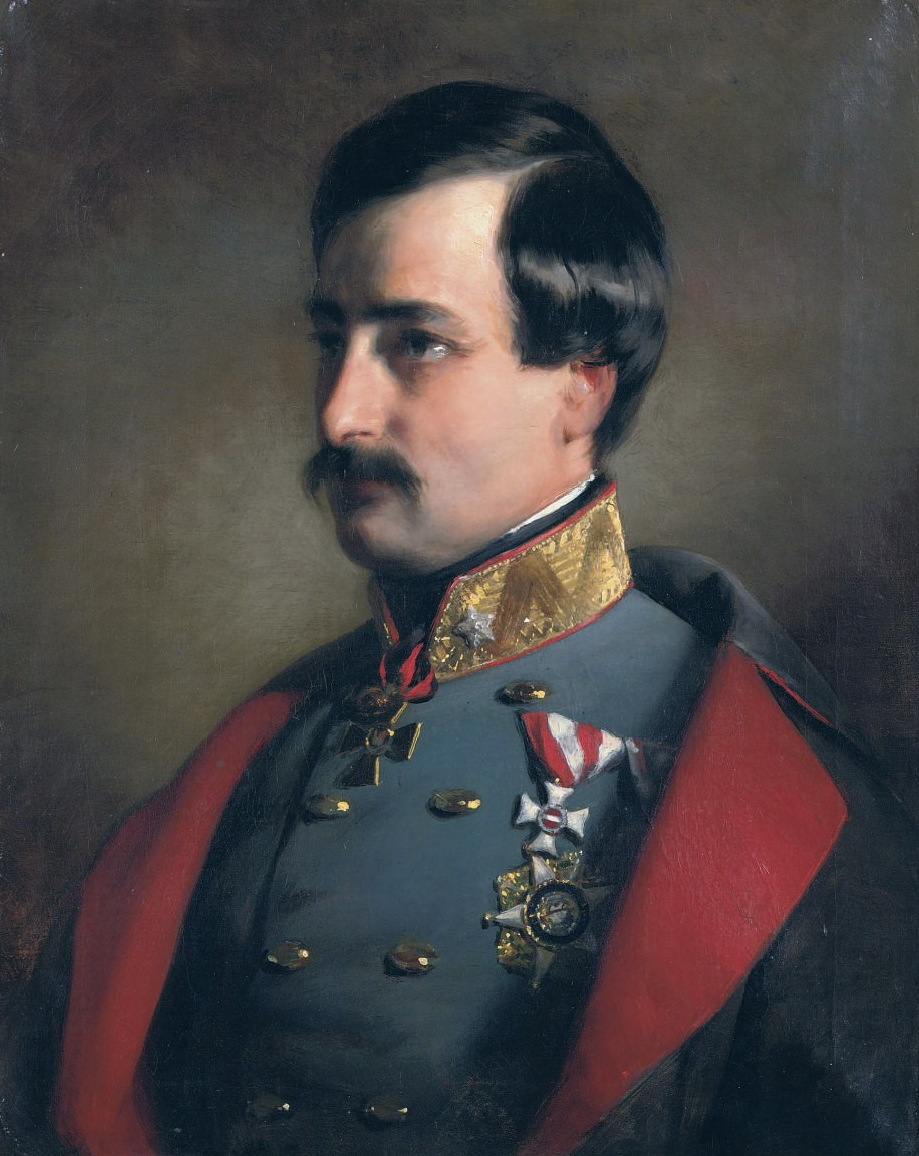
Alexander von Mensdorff-Pouilly

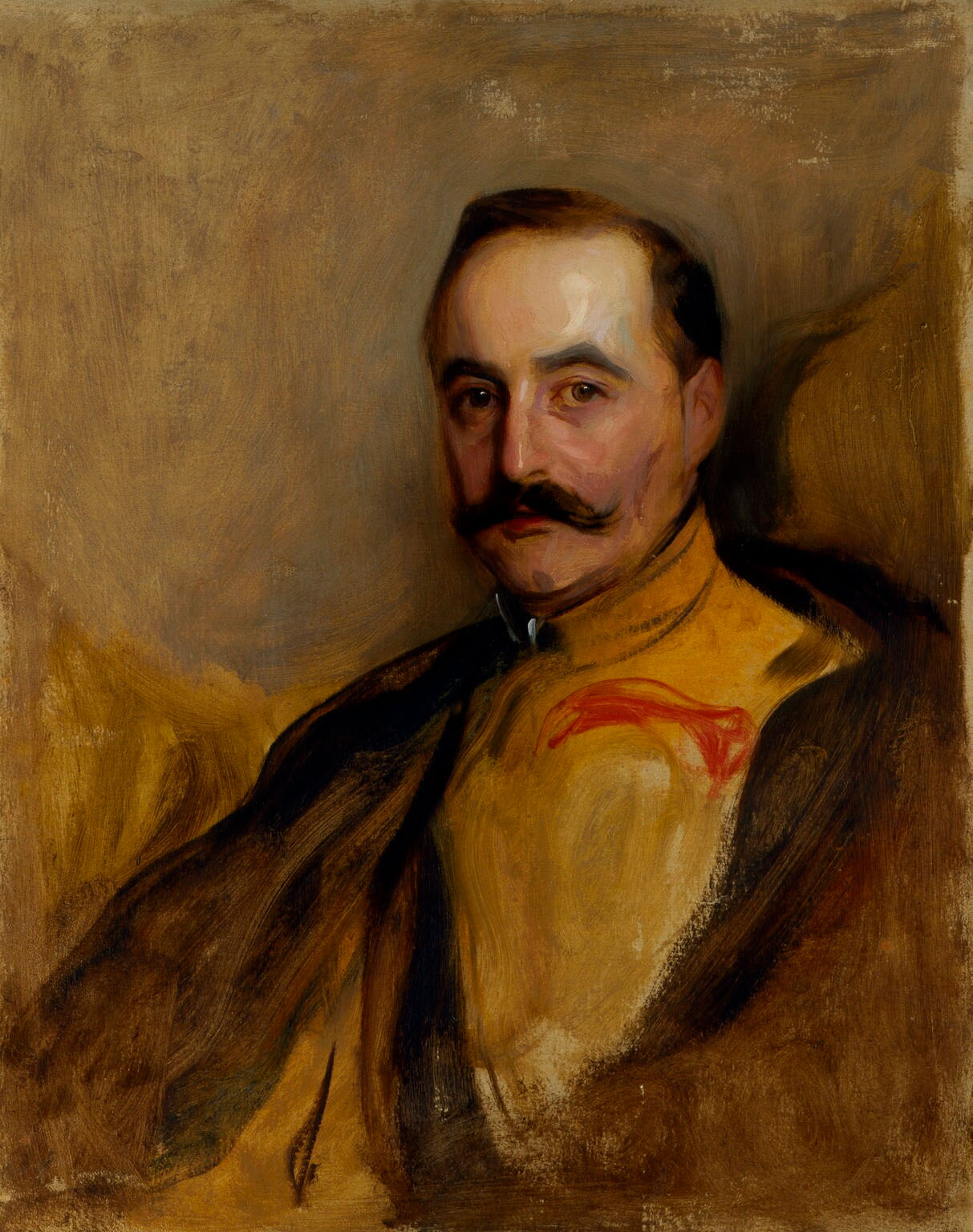
Albert von Mensdorff-Pouilly-Dietrichstein

=== Coats of arms ===
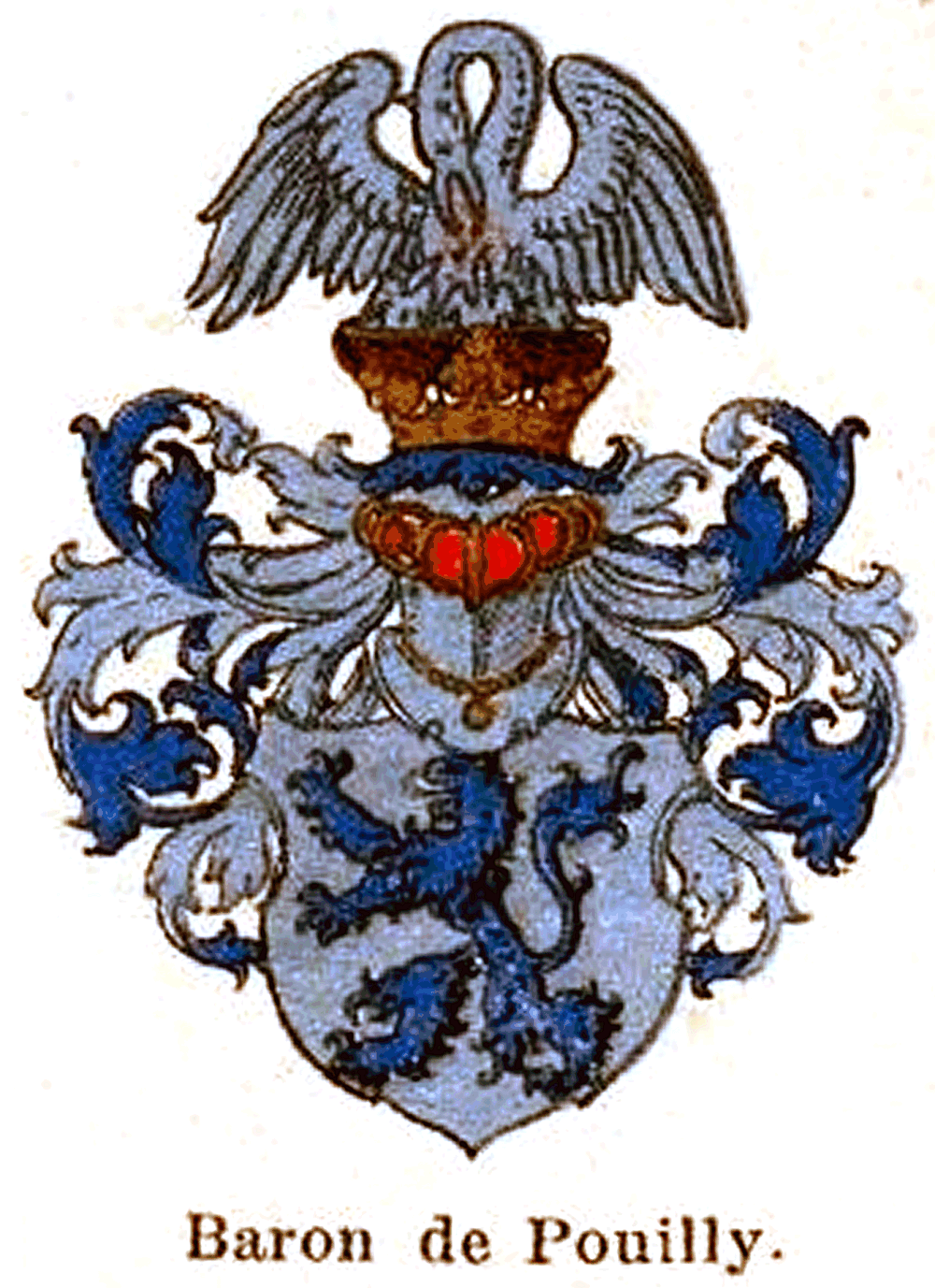
Original arms of the Pouilly family

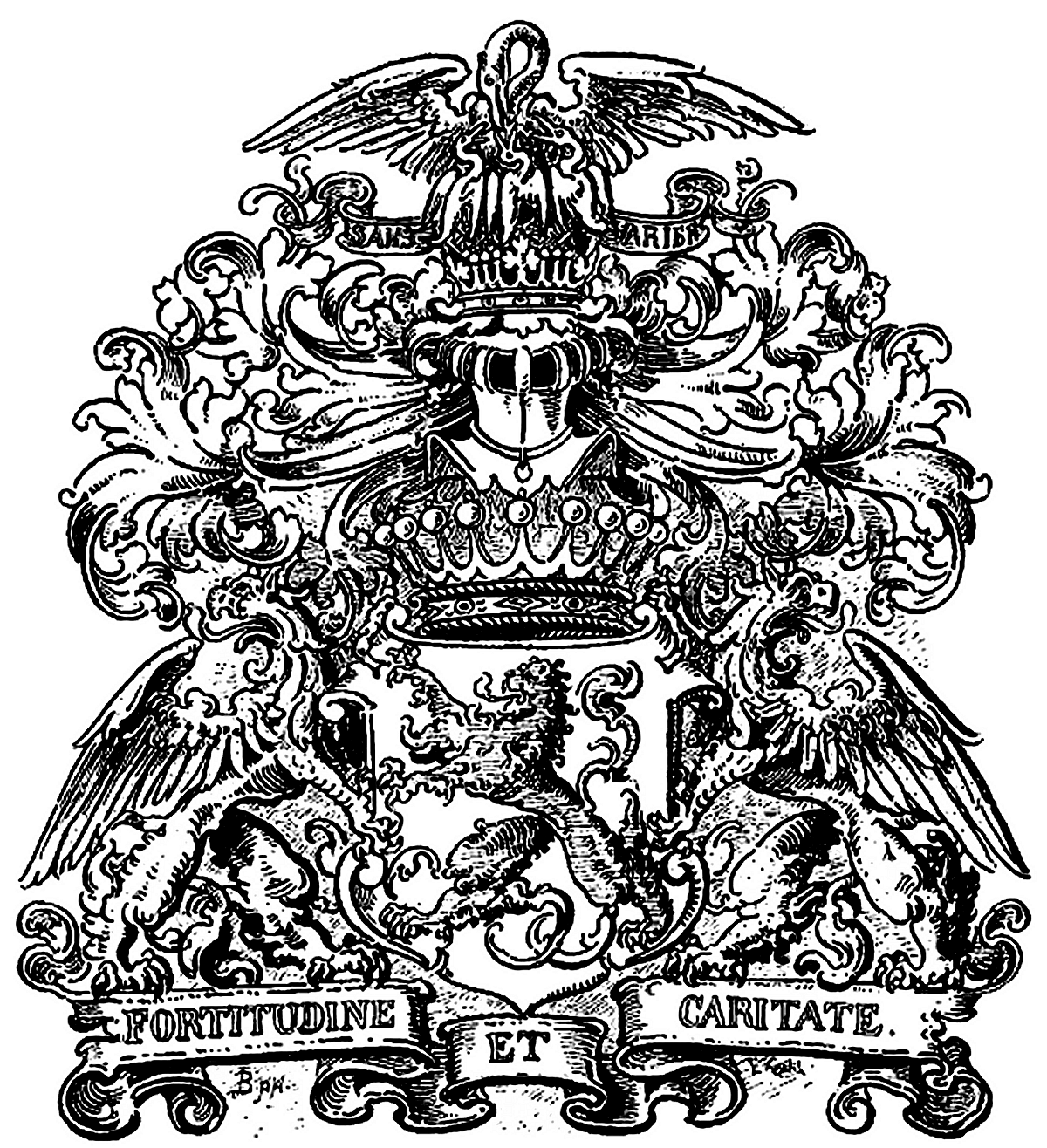
Comital arms of the Mensdorff-Pouilly family in 1844

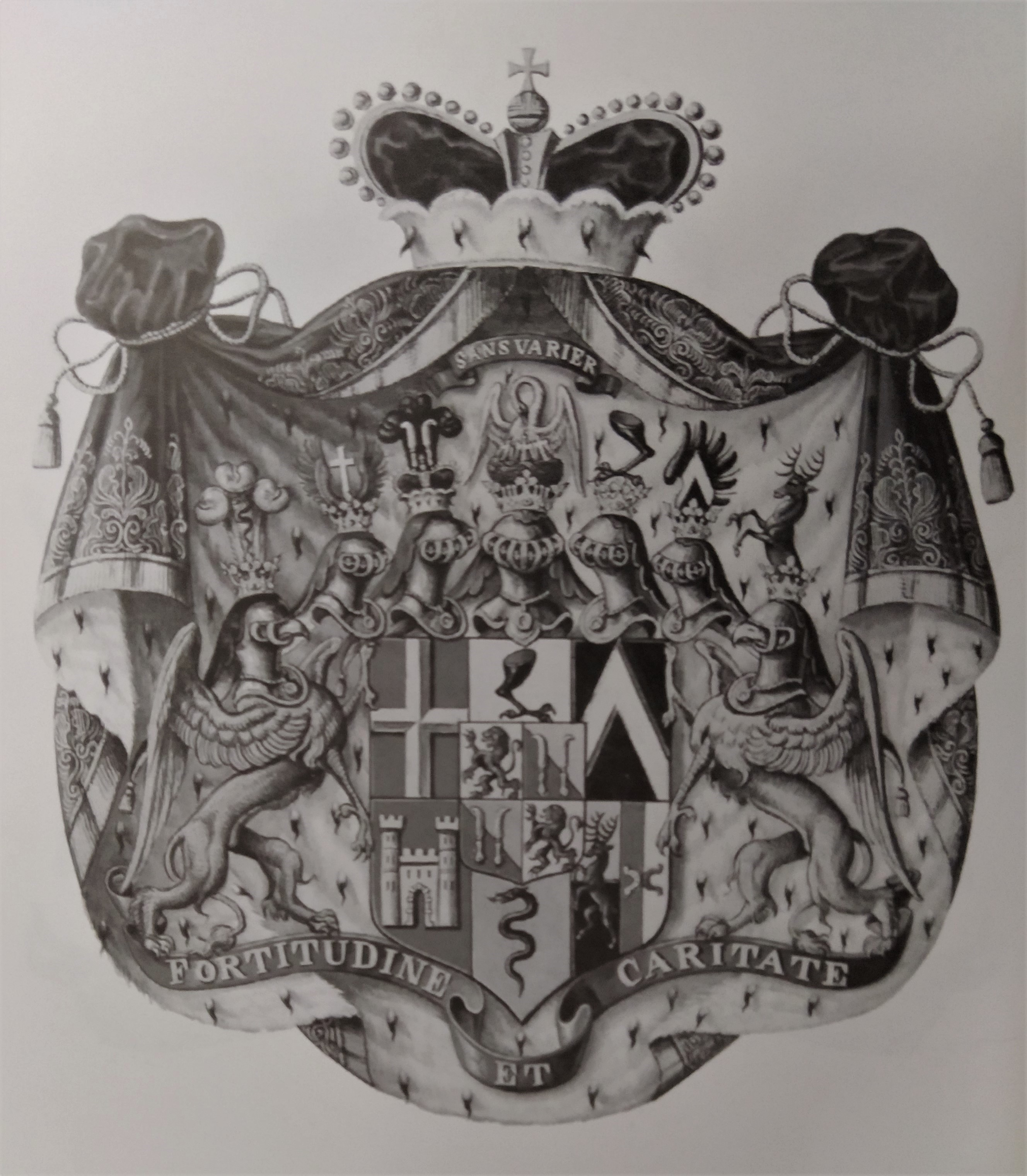
Princely arms of the Mensdorff-Pouilly-Dietrichstein branch in 1868

== Literature ==
- Eddie de Tassigny: Les Mensdorff-Pouilly. Le destin d'une famille émigrée en 1790. Le Bois d’Hélène, Bihorel 1998.
