= Princess Sophie of Saxe-Coburg-Saalfeld =

- Countess of Mensdorff-Pouilly
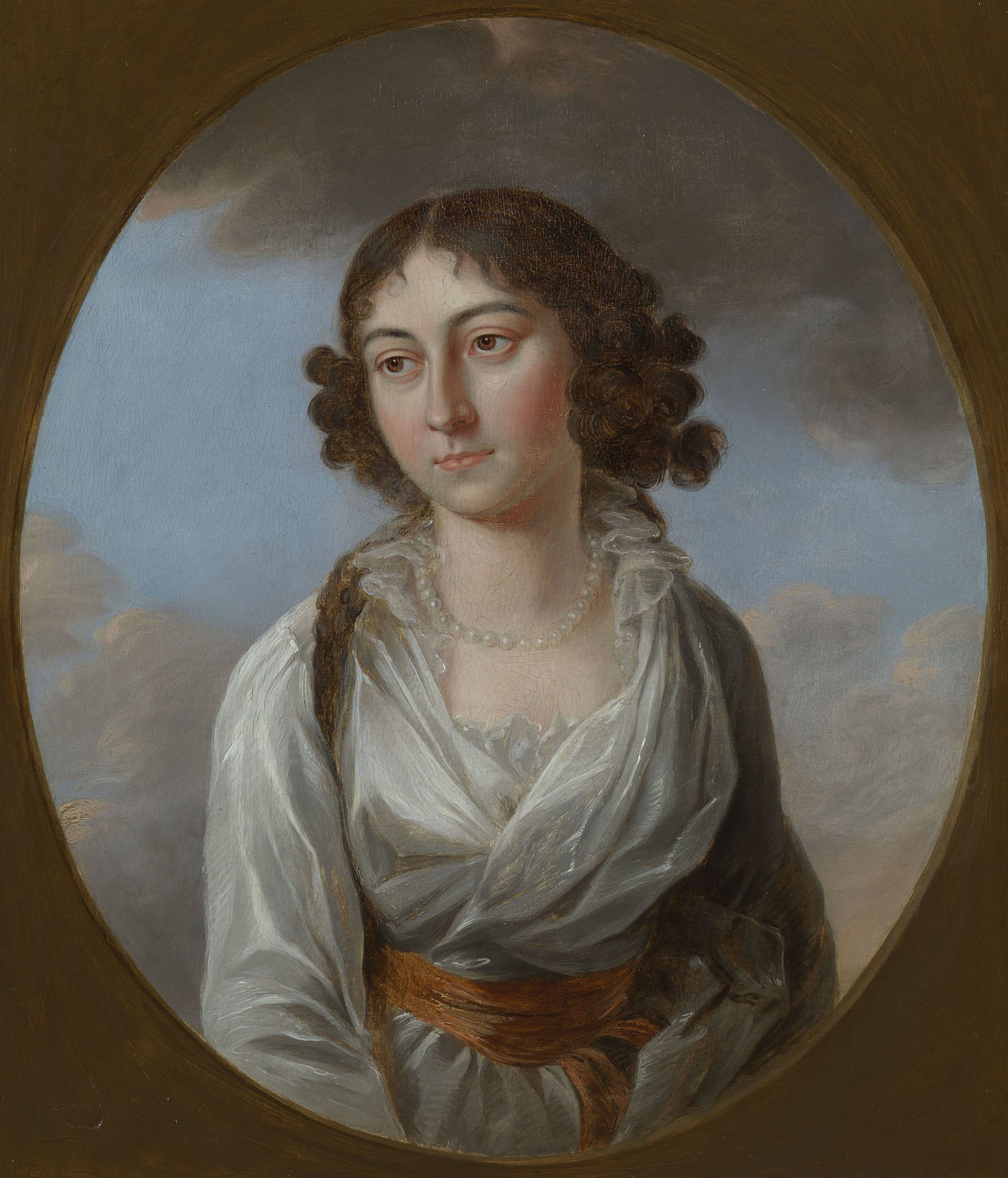
- Born: 16 August 1778; Coburg
- Died: 9 July 1835 (aged 56); Tuschimitz, Bohemia
- Spouse: Emmanuel von Mensdorff-Pouilly (m. 1804)
- Issue: Hugo Ferdinand von Mensdorff-Pouilly; Alphons, Count von Mensdorff-Pouilly; Alfred Carl von Mensdorff-Pouilly; Alexander von Mensdorff-Pouilly; Leopold Emanuel von Mensdorff-Pouilly; Arthur August von Mensdorff-Pouilly
Names
- Sophie Frederica Caroline Louise
- House: Saxe-Coburg-Saalfeld
- Father: Francis, Duke of Saxe-Coburg-Saalfeld
- Mother: Countess Augusta Reuss of Ebersdorf

Princess Sophie Friederike Karoline Luise of Saxe-Coburg-Saalfeld (16 August 1778 – 9 July 1835) was a princess of Saxe-Coburg-Saalfeld, the sister of Princess Victoria of Saxe-Coburg-Saalfeld and King Leopold I of Belgium, and the maternal aunt of Queen Victoria. By marriage, she was the Countess of Mensdorff-Pouilly.

She was born in Coburg, the eldest child of Francis, Duke of Saxe-Coburg-Saalfeld by his second wife, Countess Augusta Reuss of Ebersdorf.

== Early life ==
Sophie had a particularly close relationship with her sister, Antoinette, and both often attended the Schloss Fantaisie, a sanctuary of French emigrants. It was there where she met her future husband, Emmanuel von Mensdorff-Pouilly. He was the second son of Albert-Louis, Baron de Pouilly et de Chaffour, Comte de Roussy and his wife, Marie Antoinette de Custine, who emigrated together with their children during the French Revolution. His elder brother, Albert and Emmanuel, took the name Mensdorff from a community in the county of Roussy, Luxembourg. They married morganatically on 23 February 1804 in Coburg. Her husband was elevated to count in 1818.

In 1806, her husband was in Saalfeld, a secondary residence of the Coburg court. Therefore, it was possible for him to have participated in the Battle of Saalfeld, he retrieved the remains of Prince Louis Ferdinand of Prussia from the battlefield and protected the residence of Sophie's father and family against the arrogance of the victorious French troops.

From 1824 to 1834, Sophie lived in Mainz, where her husband was a commander of the federal fortress; here, she was generally referred to as "Princess". She was active as a writer and, in 1830, published her romantic collection of fairy tales, Mährchen und Erzählungen. She received the Dame Grand Cross of the Order of Saint Catherine.

Sophie died in Tuschimitz, Bohemia, on July 9, 1835. She was buried in the park of Schloss Preitenstein, the family residence of the Mensdorff-Pouilly family.

== Family ==
Emmanuel and Sophie had six sons:

- Hugo Ferdinand von Mensdorff-Pouilly (1806–1847)
- Alphons, Count von Mensdorff-Pouilly (1810–1894); married, firstly, in 1843, Countess Therese von Dietrichstein-Proskau-Leslie (1823–1856); married, secondly, in 1862, Countess Maria Theresia von Lamberg (1833–1876), daughter of Count Franz Philipp von Lamberg
- Alfred Carl von Mensdorff-Pouilly (1812–1814)
- Alexander von Mensdorff-Pouilly (1813–1871), Fürst von Dietrichstein zu Nikolsburg 1868, was Austrian Foreign Minister and Prime Minister of Austria in the 1860s; married in 1857 Countess Alexandrine Maria von Dietrichstein-Proskau-Leslie (1824–1906)
- Leopold Emanuel von Mensdorff-Pouilly (1815–1832)
- Arthur August von Mensdorff-Pouilly (1817–1904); married, firstly, in 1853, Magdalene Kremzow (1835–1899), divorced in 1882; married, secondly, in 1902, Countess Bianca Albertina von Wickenburg (1837–1912)

== Ancestry ==
Ancestors of Princess Sophie of Saxe-Coburg-Saalfeld

8. Francis Josias, Duke of Saxe-Coburg-Saalfeld
4. Ernest Frederick, Duke of Saxe-Coburg-Saalfeld
9. Princess Anna Sophie of Schwarzburg-Rudolstadt
2. Francis, Duke of Saxe-Coburg-Saalfeld
10. Ferdinand Albert II, Duke of Brunswick-Wolfenbüttel
5. Princess Sophie Antoinette of Brunswick-Wolfenbüttel
11. Princess Antoinette of Brunswick-Wolfenbüttel
1. Princess Sophie of Saxe-Coburg-Saalfeld
12. Heinrich XXIX, Count Reuss of Ebersdorf
6. Heinrich XXIV, Count Reuss of Ebersdorf
13. Sophie Theodora of Castell-Remlingen
3. Countess Augusta Reuss of Ebersdorf
14. George August, Count of Erbach-Schönberg
7. Countess Karoline Ernestine of Erbach-Schönberg
15. Countess Ferdinande Henriette of Stolberg-Gedern
