= Joseph Franz, Prince of Dietrichstein =

German prince (1798–1858)

Joseph Franz
- Prince of Dietrichstein
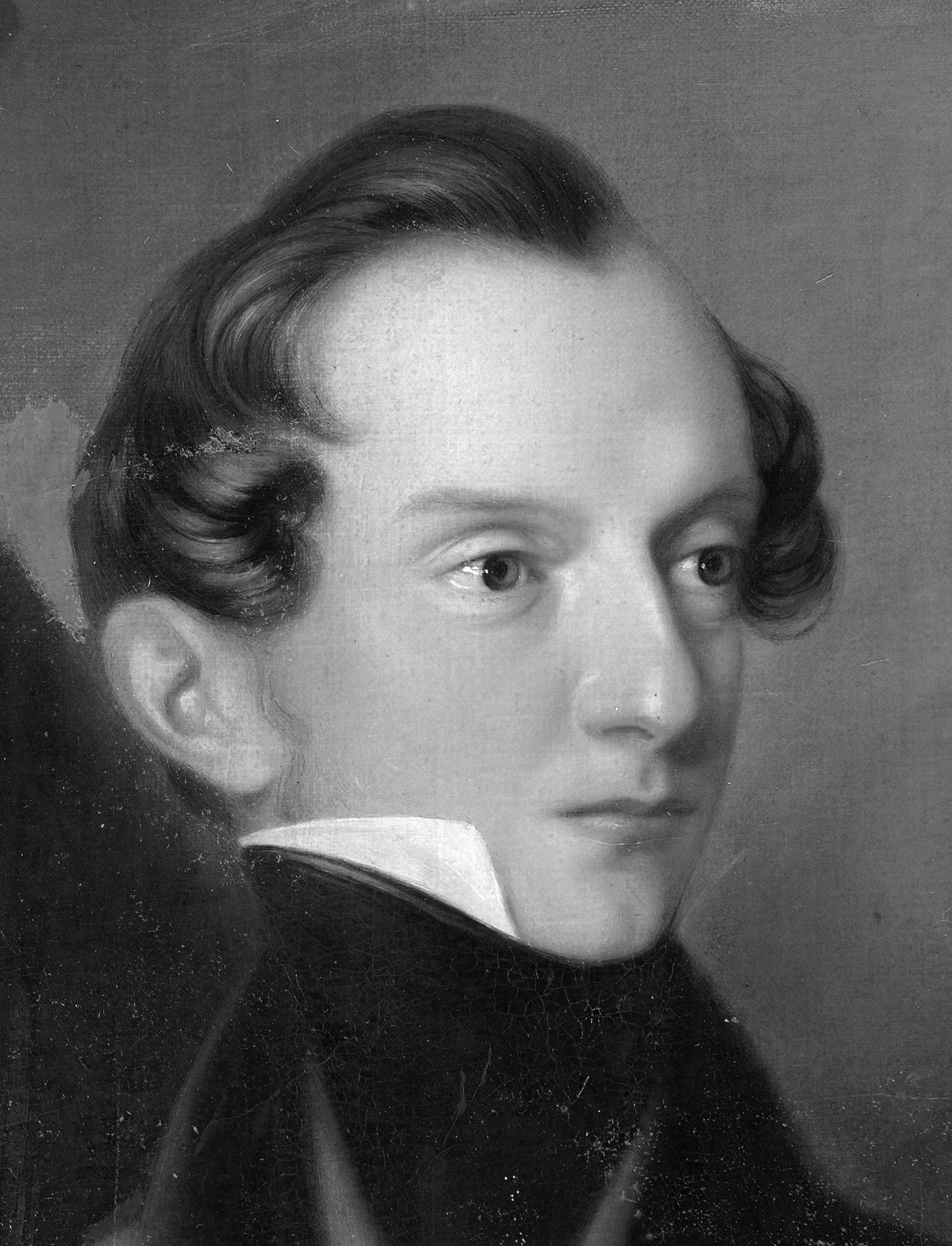

9th Prince of Dietrichstein zu Nikolsburg
- Reign: 10 July 1854 – 10 July 1858
- Predecessor: Franz Joseph, Prince of Dietrichstein
- Successor: Moritz, Prince of Dietrichstein
- Born: 28 March 1798; Saint Petersburg, Russian Empire
- Died: 10 July 1858 (aged 60); Frýdlant Castle, Austrian Empire
- Burial: Dietrichstein tomb, Nikolsburg
- Spouse: Countess Gabriele Wratislaw von Mitrowitz (m. 1821, died)
- Issue: Theresia, Countess von Herberstein; Alexandrine Maria, Princess of Dietrichstein-Nikolsburg; Gabriele, Princess von Hatzfeldt-Wildenburg; Clothilde, Countess von Clam-Gallas
Names
- Joseph Franz von Dietrichstein-Proskau-Leslie
- House: Diertrichstein
- Father: Franz Joseph, Prince of Dietrichstein
- Mother: Countess Alexandra Andreevna Shuvalova

Joseph Franz, Prince of Dietrichstein (28 March 1798 – 10 July 1858), was a German prince, Major general, 9th Prince (Fürst) of Dietrichstein zu Nikolsburg, Count of Proskau-Leslie, Baron (Freiherr) of Hollenburg, Finkenstein and Thalberg.

== Early life and education ==
Born in St. Petersburg, as a member of an ancient House of Dietrichstein, one of the most distinguished families of the Austrian nobility, he was the only son and only child of Franz Joseph, 8th Prince of Dietrichstein, and his wife, Countess Alexandra Andreevna Shuvalova (1775-1847), Court lady at the Imperial court of Austria, a daughter of the Russian senator and writer, Count Andrei Petrovich Shuvalov (1742-1789) and his wife, Countess Ekaterina Shuvalova, a Court lady of Catherine the Great. Both his mother Alexandra and his maternal grandmother Ekaterina were famed for their crafted court intrigues.

Shortly after his birth his parents' marriage ended. His mother moved to Italy, where she remained the rest of her life. Franz was left under the care of his father, who raised him with progressive English views. Joseph Franz studied in Prague and Vienna, where he attended to lectures of the called "Austrian Bolzano", Vincenz Weindtridta, later provost of Nikolsburg.

Shortly after his marriage in 1821, Joseph Franz received from his father the Bohemian states of the family, and thanks to this he was one of the members of the family who became more close to the Czech nobility. Often stayed in Prague, he came into contact with Czech patriots and his ideas.

== Career ==
Joseph Franz was one of the initiators of the Unity to encourage industry in the Czech Republic (Jednota ku povzbuzení průmyslu v Čechách), which was founded in Prague on 1 March 1833, and during 1833-1840 he was his President. He further participated in the associational Prague life: he was a member of the Economic Company (Hospodářské společnosti) and the Society of the National Museum of the Kingdom of Bohemia (království českého a Společnosti vlasteneckého muzea království českého).

An avid collector of art and paintings, when he assumed the title of Prince of Dietrichstein after his father's death (10 July 1854), he called from Prague the sculptor Emanuel Max to create his sculpture, which was placed after his completion in the Hall of Ancestors at Nikolsburg Castle.

Having fathered only four daughters and also neither of his male relatives had surviving male issue, in the 1850s for Joseph Franz was clear that the House of Dietrichstein was doomed to extinction. In 1856, he entered into an agreement with the last surviving male of the family, his uncle Moritz about the future of the family's heritage. Moritz, following the primogeniture, assumed the succession of the princely title, but the lands and properties where divided among the four daughters of Joseph Franz.

During a visit to his youngest daughter, Joseph Franz died at Frýdlant Castle in 1858, aged 60. He was buried in the family crypt at Nikolsburg Castle.

== Marriage and issue ==
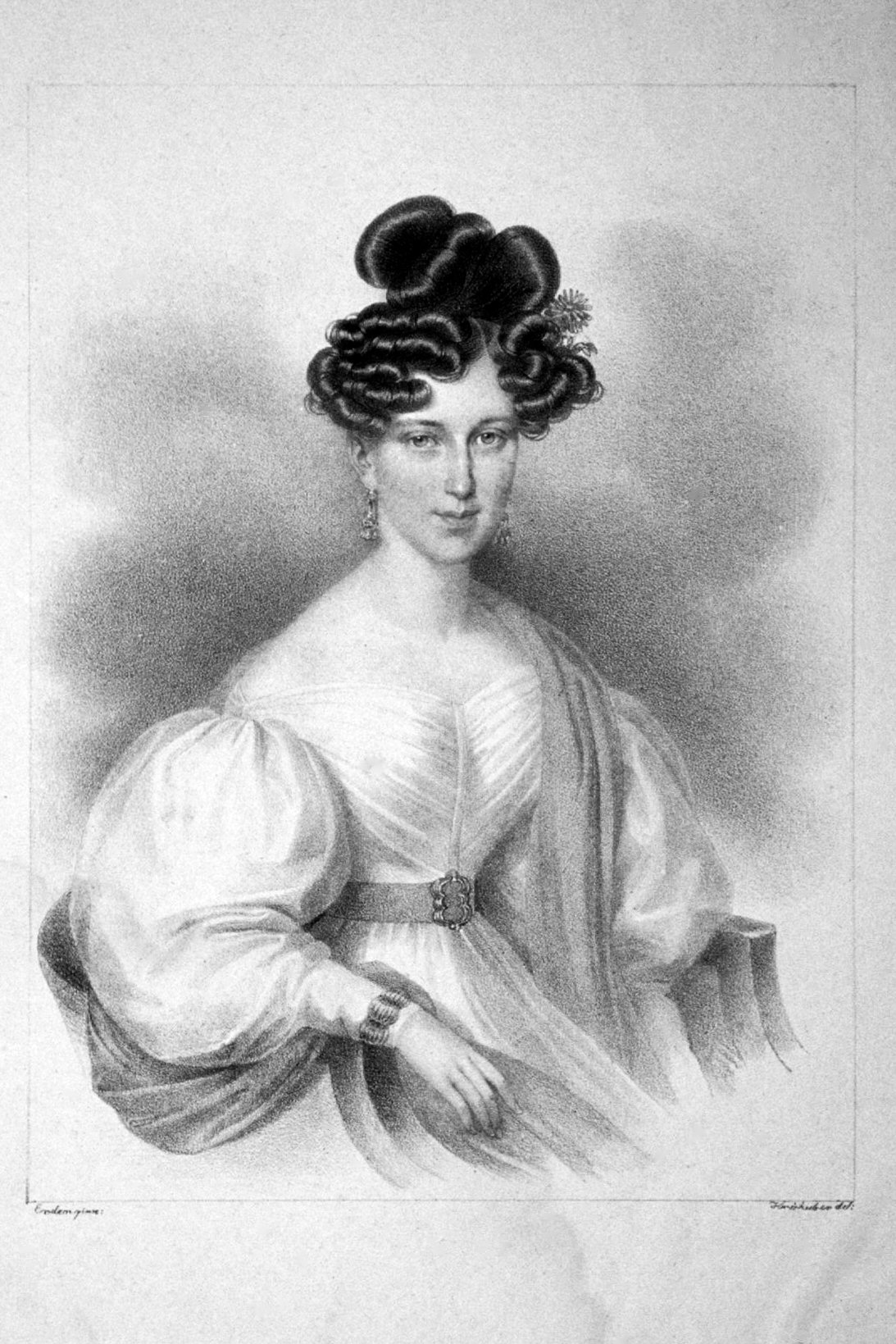
Countess Gabriele von Dietrichstein-Proskau-Leslie (1804-1880), born Countess Wratislav von Mitrowitz, wife of Prince Joseph Franz

On 21 February 1821, Joseph Franz married with Countess Gabriele Antonia Maria Apollonia Johanna Nepomuzena Felizitas (1804-1880), daughter of Josef Antonín, Count Wratislav von Mitrowitz (1764-1830) by his wife, Countess Marie Gabriele Valentine Des Fours-Walderode (1771-1840). They had four daughters:

- Theresia (15 October 1822 – 12 March 1895), married on 15 November 1849 to Count Johann Frederick von Herberstein (1810-1861). She inherited the Fideikomiss received from Prince Gundakar of Dietrichstein-Hollenburg (1623-1690) in 1690, who contained, among other things, Libochovice palace and the Austrian estates in Vienna, in addition with Dolní Kounice, Ptuj Castle in Slovenia and their Hungarian estates.
- Alexandrine Maria (28 February 1824 – 22 February 1906), married on 28 April 1857 to Count Alexander of Mensdorff-Pouilly. She inherited the most important assets: Nikolsburg (for centuries the seat of the family) with his castle, another palace in Vienna and the Weidlingau villa.
- Gabriele (8 December 1825 – 24 December 1909), married on 1 September 1852 to Prince Alfred von Hatzfeldt-Wildenburg (1825-1911). She inherited Lipník nad Bečvou, Hranice na Moravě with the rest of the Moravian estates.
- Clothilde (26 June 1828 – 31 October 1899), married on 28 April 1850 to Count Eduard von Clam und Gallas. She inherited the Bohemian estates: Žďár nad Sázavou and Přibyslav, along with the Dietrichstein Palace in Währinger Strasse, Vienna.

An important and extensive ancestral graphic collection, which dates have not yet been processed, were inherited by both Theresia and Gabriele. The four sisters also shared a collection of paintings and family portraits later held in Vienna. The core of the family portraits, however, remained intact at Nikolsburg Castle.

In late 1868, Alexandrine's husband, Count Alexander of Mensdorff-Pouilly, obtained from the Emperor the title of Prince of Dietrichstein-Nikolsburg, thus reviving the title of his wife's family. The title of Count of Proskau passed to the only son of Theresia, who in 1896 changed his title to Count of Herberstein-Proskau.
