= Fulneck (disambiguation) =

Fulneck Moravian Settlement is a village in Pudsey in the City of Leeds metropolitan borough, West Yorkshire, England.

Fulneck may also refer to:

== Places ==
=== England ===
- Fulneck Moravian Church
  - Fulneck School

== People ==
- Jakub Fulnek (born 1994)

== Sports ==
- Fotbal Fulnek

== See also ==
- Fulnek, a town in Northern Moravia, Czech Republic
