= Christian Frederick Hassé =

- Born: 1771; Sarepta, Russia
- Died: 1 May 1831 (aged 59–60); Fulneck, Yorkshire, England
- Occupations: Composer; Organist; Teacher
- Spouse: Anna Cossart/Hassé

Christian Frederick Hassé (1771–1831) was a composer of church music and an organist. He was a member of the Moravian community.

In an 1829 "directory of trades and professions" for Pudsey he is listed twice, and identified as a "processor of music" and as a "gent.".

== Life ==
He was born in Sarepta, a small town near the confluence of the Volga and Sarpa Rivers. Sarepta was a Moravian colony, recently established at the instigation of the empress Catherine the Great as part of a wider strategy which involved attracting large numbers of German settlers to the region in order to modernise agricultural practices and create a buffer against tribal incursions into Russia from the south.

Hassé received his secondary education at Barby, on the banks of the Elbe, and then in Niesky, in western Silesia. Niesky was another town established by Moravians expelled from their homeland a generation earlier as part of a more assertive policy to reimpose Roman Catholicism on Moravia. In Niesky Hassé was taught by Christian Gregor (1723–1801), a Moravian bishop who was also a prolific composer of hymns. After this Hassé embarked on a career in teaching, teaching classics at Barby, Niesky, and near to Herrnhut. All three places had large Moravian communities at the time.

He then moved on again, to Fulneck near Leeds in Yorkshire, England, arriving in 1804. Here Hassé became organist of the chapel of the Moravian community, also working as a teacher of music and languages in the school attached to the chapel. He is credited with having "improved musical taste" in the Fulneck area "by introducing foreign masterpieces and organising orchestral meetings".

== Personal ==
There is evidence in the 1770 will of Sarah Cennick, another member of the Fulbeck Moravian community, that as early as 1770 there were two adults named Hasse living in Fulbeck.

In 1808, Christian Friedrich Hassé married Ann Cossart. The marriage produced six recorded children, including church bishop Alexander Hassé.

At the age of 60 (or 61: sources differ) Christian Frederick Hassé died suddenly on 1 May 1831 and was buried at the Moravian Church in Fulbeck on 5 May 1831.

== Output ==
In 1851 it was recorded that Hassé had written many hymns which had not been "collected", and it is not known whether any subsequent attempts have been made to collect and index his compositions.

In 1822 he had published in London, Polyhymnia, or Select Airs by celebrated foreign Composers, adapted to words by James Montgomery (another of the Fulneck Moravians).

In addition, he had published in Leeds a compilation entitled, Sacred Music, partly original, partly selected; this appeared in two volumes, the first of which appeared in 1829 and the second of which appeared posthumously in 1832. The original compositions, apparently written by himself, included a chorus, "Blessed are they", a recitative and air, "The Mountains shall depart", and a bass solo with chorus entitled, "Amen, praise the Lord".
