= Buku Ende =

Toba Batak Protestant Hymnal

Buku Ende (lit. 'Book of Hymns') is a hymnal in the Toba Batak language used most prominently in the Batak Christian Protestant Church but also other Protestant Batak churches in Indonesia. Many of them are even added to Buku Ende dohot Tangiang Katolik, the Toba Batak Catholic Hymnal, and Kidung Jemaat, the Indonesian Protestant Hymnal that is used by Protestant churches affiliated in Communion of Churches in Indonesia.

The book is organized and published by the Printing Press of HKBP in Pematang Siantar, North Sumatra, Indonesia. Back then, there were only as many as 556 hymns in it. However in the new edition, Buku Ende has added 308 additional hymns (BE-557 to BE-864). This edition is also called as Buku Ende Sangap Di Jahowa (SDJ) or The "Praise the Lord" Hymnal.

At first, all of the hymns in Buku Ende were translated only from German. Then, the hymnal expanded its numbers to include hymns from Dutch and English. But as more hymns were added to the hymnal, it started adding hymns and contemporary worship songs from other countries and ethnic groups as well. Buku Ende also adapted the energetic tone and rhythm of gospel songs and ethnic songs to be more fitted to the calm style of worship.

The accompaniment to the melody of the hymns are written in the other book called Buku Logu (lit. Book of Songs). Back then, the only instruments allowed to accompany the melody in the worship services are Organs and Pianos. They had to follow the musical notes as they were written without doing too much improvisations. As time went on, more electronic musical instruments got the permission to be played alongside the traditional ones, despite some critiques and backlashes from oppositions. This on-going modernization is mostly influenced by the Youth who prefer Charismatic's style of worship songs but still want to adhere to the traditional liturgy.

Since a lot of Toba Batak churches have non-native Toba Batak speakers, especially those that are located in the urban areas and metropolitan areas, including converts and interethnic marriage couples, they also provide the worship in Indonesian, and so translated the whole hymnal to become Buku Nyanyian HKBP, the Indonesian version of Buku Ende.

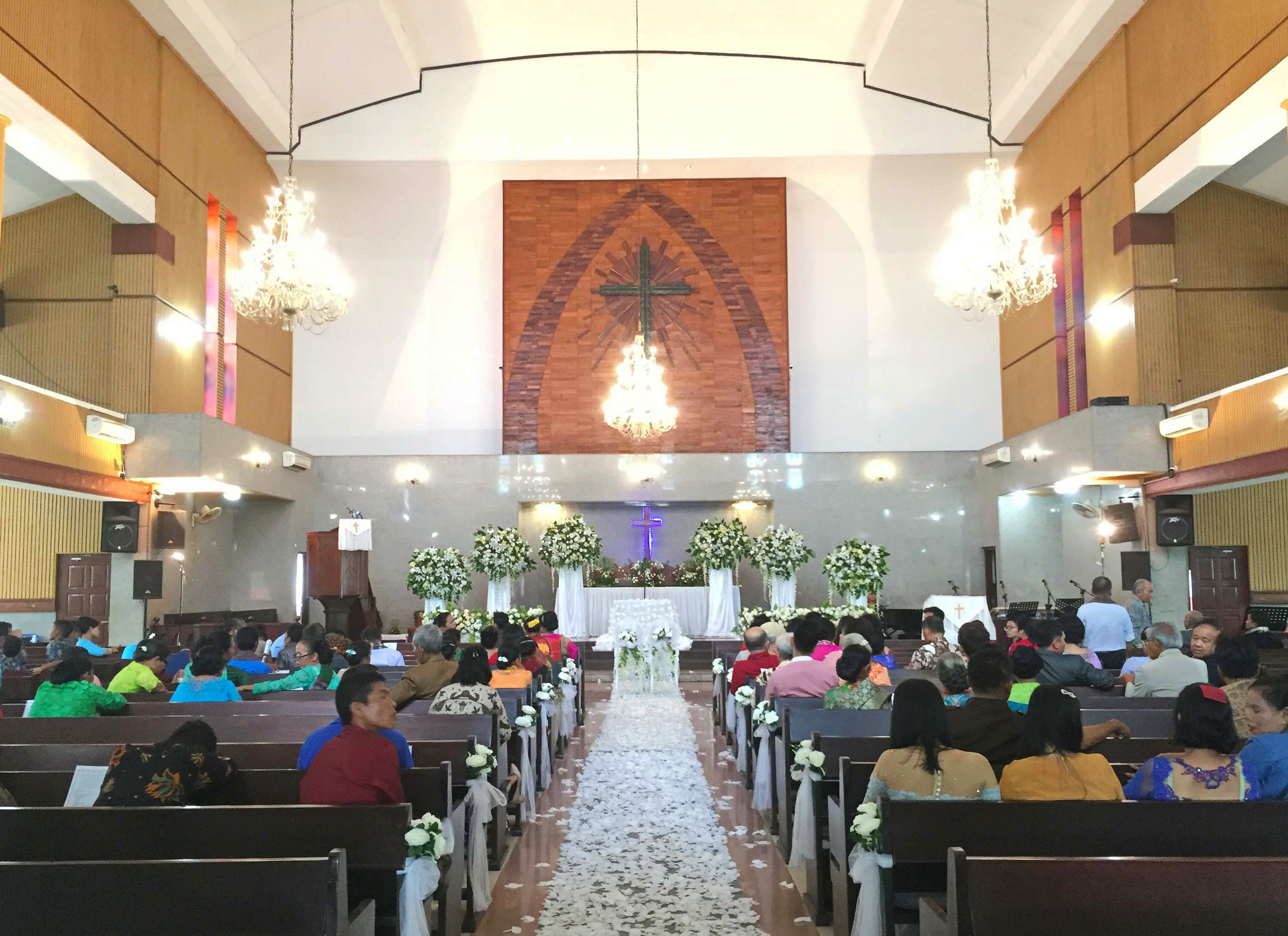
HKBP Medan Sudirman is an example of a church that uses Buku Ende and Buku Nyanyian HKBP almost exclusively in every worship service.

== Buku Ende I ==
Below are the hymns of Buku Ende printed in the first edition of 1924.

=== Ende Puji-pujian (Hymns of Praise) ===
- BE-001/BL-223, Ringgas ma Ho Tondingku, BL-223
  - Lyrics: Johann Gramann (1530)
  - Melody: Hans Kugelmann (1530)
- BE-002/BL-113, Naeng Pujionku Ho, Jahowa
  - Lyrics: Bartholomäus Crasselius (1695)
  - Melody: Johann Anastasius Freylinghausen (1690)
- BE-003/BL-137, Puji Jahowa, Ale Tondingku
  - Lyrics: Lobe den Herren, o meine Seele by Johan Daniel Herrnschmidt (1714)
  - Melody: Germany (1664), Johann Anastasius Freylinghausen (1714)
- BE-004/BL-148, Sai Puji Debata
  - Lyrics: Martin Rinckart (1636)
  - Melody: Johann Crüger (1647)
- BE-005/BL-083, Sai Tapuji ma Jahowa
  - Lyrics: Matthias Jorissen (1793)
  - Melody: Johann Georg Bässler (1806)
- BE-006/BL-056, Puji Jahowa na Sangap
  - Lyrics: Joachim Neander (1680)
  - Melody: Johann Anastasius Freylinghausen (1665)
- BE-007/BL-043, Puji Hamu ma Asi ni Roha
  - Lyrics and Melody: Matthäus Apelles von Löwenstern (1644)
- BE-008/BL-197, Jahowa, Jahowa
  - Lyrics: Gottlieb Konrad Pfeffel (1736-1809)
  - Melody: Johann Carl Gerold (1809)
- BE-009/BL-110, Hupuji Holong ni
  - Lyrics: Ich bete an die Macht der Liebe by Gerhard Tersteegen (1750)
  - Melody: Kol' Slaven Nash by Dmitry Bortniansky (1794)
- BE-010/BL-128, Hupuji, Hupasangap Ho
  - Lyrics: Johann Jacob Schütz (1673)
  - Melody: Peter Sohren (1683)
- BE-011/BL-185, Aha Ma Endehononku
  - Lyrics: Ludwig Andreas Gotter (1695)
  - Melody: Christoph Anton (1643)
- BE-012/BL-015, Dipuji Rohangkon do Ho
  - Lyrics: Paul Gerhardt (1653)
  - Melody: Johann Crüger (1653)
- BE-013/BL-213, Nda Tama Endehononku
  - Lyrics: Paul Gerhardt (1653)
  - Melody: Johann Schop (1641)
- BE-014/BL-057, Puji Hamu Jahowa Tutu
  - Lyrics: Karl Friedrich Wilhelm Herrosee (1754-1821)
  - Melody: Karl Friedrich Schulz (1784-1850)
- BE-015/BL-103, Aut na Saribu Hali Ganda
  - Lyrics: O dass ich tausend Zungen hätte by Johann Mentzer (1704)
  - Melody: Frankfurt am Main 1737, Johann Balthasar König (1738)
- BE-016/BL-012, Tapuji ma Tuhanta Sian
  - Lyrics: Ludwig Helmbold (1575)
  - Melody: Nikolaus Selnecker (1587)
- BE-017/BL-210, Raja na Tumimbul
  - Lyrics: Gott ist gegenwärtig by Gerhard Tersteegen (1729)
  - Melody: Bremen (Joachim Neander?) (1680)

== Ende Di Ari Minggu (Hymns in Sundays) ==
- BE-018/BL-084, Ungkap Bahal na Umuli
  - Lyrics: Tut mir auf die schöne Pforte by Benjamin Schmolck (1732)
  - Melody: Unser Herrscher (Neander) by Joachim Neander (1680)
- BE-019/BL-032, O Jesus, Tatap ma Tuson
  - Melody: Joachim Neander (1680)
- BE-020/BL-006, O Jesus, Tuhannami
  - Melody: Gochzzeim (1628)
- BE-021/BL-072, Bege ma Sude Hamu
  - Melody: Choral Busch 29, Melchior Vulpius (1609)
- BE-022/BL-080, Nunga Ro di Parguruan
  - Melody: Peter Rinter (1636)
- BE-023/BL-078, Jesus, Hami Ro Dison
  - Melody: Johann Georg Ebeling (1666)
- BE-024/BL-059, Tatap Hami On
  - Melody: Johann Rudolph Ahle (1664)
- BE-025/BL-181, HataMi, Ale Tuhanku
  - Melody: Johann Anastasius Freylinghausen (1704)
- BE-026/BL-180, Dame NimMu, Ale Jesus
  - Melody: Johann Schop (1642)
- BE-027/BL-86, Haleluya! Ari Minggu
  - Melody: Heinrich Albert (1642)
- BE-028/BL-203, Hata ni Jahowa
  - Melody: Christian Friedrich Witt (1715)
- BE-029/BL-186, Ima Tingki Hasonangan
  - Melody: Jakob Hintze (1678)
- BE-030/BL-135, Jesus Lehon Hatorangan
  - Melody: Johann Anastasius Freylinghausen (1733)
- BE-031/BL-086, Ari na Marhasonangan
  - Melody: Heinrich Albert (1642)
- BE-032/BL-078, Nang Lao Ruar, Masuk pe
  - Melody: Johann Rudolph Ahle (1664)
- BE-033/BL-065, Antong, Sai Dok ma Amen
  - Melody: Heinrich Isaac (1539)
- BE-034/BL-222, Jesus do Haholonganta
  - Melody: Philipp Nicolai (1599)
- BE-035/BL-199, Sude Hami, na Dison
  - Melody: NN
- BE-036/BL-004, Pasupasu Hami
  - Melody: Christian Gregor (1764)
- BE-037/BL-048, Asi ni Roha
  - Melody: Christian Gregor (1763)

== Ende Di Adventus (Hymns in the Advent) ==
- BE-038, Paruak ma harbangan i
- BE-038a, Paruak ma harbangan i
- BE-039, Beha ma panjalongku
- BE-040, Las be ma rohamuna
- BE-041, Parripe ni Tuhanta
- BE-042, Hamu sude, naung tinoruan
- BE-043, Padiri rohamuna
- BE-044, Hamuna na porsea i
- BE-045, Hosianna, Anak ni

== Ende Di Hatutubu Ni Tuhan Jesus (Hymns in the Nativity of Lord Jesus) ==
- BE-046, Na sian ginjang do au ro
- BE-046a, Na sian ginjang do au ro
- BE-047, Di na saborngin i do binsar
- BE-048, Ria ma hita sasude, BL-016
- BE-049, Sai ro ma tu bara
- BE-049a, Sai ro ma tu bara
- BE-050, Marende ma hamu
- BE-051, Tole, puji ma Tuhppanta
- BE-052, Hatuaon do
- BE-052a, Hatuaon do
- BE-053, Di Betlehem Do Tubu
- BE-054, Sonang Ni Borngin Na I
- BE-055, Borngin na badia i
- BE-056, Sai Ro Ma Hamuna
- BE-057, Nunga Jumpang Muse
- BE-058, Martumbur tungkotungko
- BE-059, O Jesuski hupuji Ho
- BE-060, Marolopolop hamu, ale
- BE-061, Na tau las ni roha, BL-002
- BE-062, Halalas ni roha godang

== Ende Di Taon Na Imbaru (Hymns in the New Year) ==
- BE-063, Jesus, Ho do sai tongtong
- BE-064, Naung moru do muse sataon
- BE-065, Majumpang taon imbaru on
- BE-066, Debata baen donganmi
- BE-067, Hamu, ale donganku, BL-012
- BE-068, Masilelean angka taon
- BE-069, Jesus, sai urupi hami
- BE-070, Naung salpu taon na buruk i

== Ende Di Epiphanias (Hymns in the Epiphany) ==
- BE-071, O Raja na sumurung
- BE-072, Hehe ma hamu parbegu
- BE-073, Bintang ni si Jakob i
- BE-074, Sai marlasniroha hita
- BE-075, Naung binsar do panondang i

== Ende Di Hamamate Ni Tuhan Jesus (Hymns in the Death of Lord Jesus) ==
- BE-076, Sada nama sangkap
- BE-077, Hamu saluhut halak
- BE-078, O ulu na sap mudar
- BE-078a, O ulu na sap mudar
- BE-079, Di na ponjot rohangku
- BE-080, Mauas Jesus
- BE-081, Jesus, mual ni ngolungku
- BE-082, O Jesusku, tu bugangMu
- BE-083, Na lao do birubiru i
- BE-084, Aut na ginorga tu rohangku
- BE-085, Sai ingoton ni rohangku
- BE-086, Silang na badia i
- BE-087, Ho, tinobus ni Tuhanmu
- BE-088, Jesusku naung manobus ahu

== Ende Di Haheheon Ni Tuhan Jesus (Hymns in the Resurrection of Lord Jesus) ==
- BE-089, Ate di dia soropmi
- BE-090, Sai tapuji Debatanta
- BE-091, Hatuaon do
- BE-092, Puji ma na manaluhon
- BE-092a, Puji ma na manaluhon
- BE-093, Pesta Paska, hatuaon
- BE-094, Ale tondingku, naung hehe
- BE-095, Haleluya, taendehon
- BE-096, Nunga talu hamatean

== Ende Di Hananaek Ni Tuhan Jesus (Hymns in the Ascension of Lord Jesus) ==
- BE-097, Ingoton ma sadari on
- BE-098, Naung manaek do Ho
- BE-099, O ulubalang na gogo
- BE-100, Mardongan olopolop
- BE-101, Taiti gogo

== Ende Di Hasasaor Ni Tondi Parbadia (Hymns in the Descent of the Holy Spirit) ==
- BE-102, O Tondi Parbadia i, bongoti
- BE-103, O Pangapul na lumobi
- BE-104, Bongoti ma rohangku
- BE-105, Ro ma Tondi Parbadia
- BE-106, Ale Tuhan, Amanami
- BE-107, O Tondi Parbadia i, sai masuk
- BE-108, Baen ma gabagaba
- BE-109, Sai songgopi hami on

== Ende Di Trinitatis (Hymns of the Trinity) ==
- BE-110, Haleluya! pinujima
- BE-111, Patimbul be ma sangap
- BE-112, Haleluya! Tapuji ma
- BE-113, Debata Sitolu sada
- BE-114, Ale Jahowa Debata
- BE-115, Tuhan Debata
- BE-115a, Tuhan Debata
- BE-116, Ditompa Ho do au

== Ende Taringot Tu Harajaon Ni Debata (Hymns about the Kingdom of God) ==
=== Huria (Church) ===
- BE-117, Jahowa Debatanta do
- BE-118, Paian ma di hami, BL-006
- BE-119, Martua do dohonon, BL-009
- BE-120, Ale Immanuel, tatap
- BE-121, Jesus Raja ni Huria
- BE-122, Ida hinadenggan ni, BL-013
- BE-123, Ale dongan na saroha
- BE-124, Di borngin na parpudi, BL-017
- BE-125, Marlas ni roha hita on
- BE-126, O hamuna ale dongan
- BE-127, Lam gogo
- BE-127b, Lam gogo
- BE-128, Ditanda Debatanta
- BE-129, Huhalashon, huringkoti

=== Zending (Missionary) ===
- BE-130, Parohon harajaonMi
- BE-131, Batang aek usehononku
- BE-132, Anggiat apiM i ma galak
- BE-133, O Tondi na manggohi roha
- BE-134, Sai torop dope parbegu
- BE-135, Marpungu do di joloM on
- BE-136, Bidang dope na holom i
- BE-137, Nunga ro tu hita on
- BE-138, Sada parsigantunganta
- BE-139, Sada Siparmahan i
- BE-140, Girgir ma hamu
- BE-141, Sai tiur ma langkamuna
- BE-142, Pararat ma baritaM i
- BE-143, Jerusalem, Jerusalem

=== Pandidion (Baptism) ===
- BE-144, Na hot padanku
- BE-145, Ndang hapalang las ni roha
- BE-146, O Jesus naeng tardidi, BL-006
- BE-147, Jesus hami ro dison mangihuthon

=== Manopoti Haporseaon (Confession of Faith) ===
- BE-148, Sian surgo i
- BE-149, Ho tongtong ihuthononku
- BE-150, Ndang au nampuna ahu
- BE-151, Asi rohaM o Jesus

=== Ulaon Na Badia (Holy Communion) ===
- BE-152, Jesus na mamorsan
- BE-153, O Jesus naung sineat
- BE-154, Sai palinggas ho
- BE-155, Tuson ma ho ale tondingku

=== Pasahathon Tohonan Pandita (Conferring the Order of Priesthood) ===
- BE-156, Jesus, parmahan i
- BE-157, O Jesus, na marsangap i

=== Laho Marbagas (Marriage) ===
- BE-158, Jesus Debata
- BE-159, Martua dongan angka na
- BE-160, Au dohot na saripengkon

== Ende Taringot Tu Hasesaan Ni Dosa (Hymns about the Remission of Sins) ==
- BE-161, Tangihon anggukanggukkon
- BE-162, O Debata, mansai
- BE-163, Laos di jalo Jesus i
- BE-164, O Tuhan Jesus, Ho Rajangku
- BE-165, Na basa do roham di au
- BE-165b, Na basa do roham di au
- BE-166, Ai beasa di balian
- BE-167, Dijangkon Jesus do pardosa
- BE-168, Disesa Jesus dosa
- BE-169, Ho Sipangolu au
- BE-170, Ia aek santetek, BL-001
- BE-171, Tandai ma au
- BE-172, O Jesus panondang
- BE-173, Sai mulak
- BE-174, Torop dope na siat i
- BE-175, Tudia ho, na loja i
- BE-176, Na mungkap do Surgo, BL-003
- BE-177, Ndada tarhatahon
- BE-178, Ro ma tu Jesus
- BE-179, Adong Do Sada Mual
- BE-180, Ro tu Jesus, ho na loja
- BE-181, Ndang na tarpaboa
- BE-182, Tu joloM o Debatangku

== Ende Taringot Tu Haporseaon (Hymns about the Faith ==
- BE-183, Na jumpang au
- BE-184, Nunga tung jumpang au ojahan
- BE-185, Holan sada Debatanta
- BE-186, Jahowa do haposanki
- BE-187, Denggan do panogum
- BE-188, Jahowa siparmahan au
- BE-189, O Jesus na pangolu au
- BE-190, Las rohangku situtu
- BE-191, Hosana do nilehon
- BE-192, O Tuhan Jesus, Raja
- BE-193, Maribak langit
- BE-194, Aut so asi roham
- BE-195, Holong do roha
- BE-196, Sai hujaha di pustaha
- BE-197, Na marmahani hita, BL-008
- BE-198, Aut unang Ho
- BE-199, Sai ingot Jesus Tuhanmi
- BE-200, Di surgo do alealenta
- BE-201, Na martungkot sere au
- BE-202, Huhaholongi ho
- BE-203, Holong do rohangkon di Ho
- BE-204, Ndang tadingkononku Ho – 1
- BE-204a, Ndang tadingkononku Ho
- BE-205, Ale Jesus Tuhannami
- BE-206, Na dison do au Tuhanku
- BE-207, Sai tiop ma tanganku
- BE-208, Ale dongan na tarhurung
- BE-209, Na sonang au
- BE-210, O Tuhan na marasi roha
- BE-211, Tuhan Jesus Siparmahan
- BE-212, Haholongan na badia
- BE-213, Dung sonang rohangku
- BE-214, Sonang di lambung Jesus
- BE-215, Na martua, ninna Jesus
- BE-216, Gargar dolok
- BE-217, Jahowa do donganku
- BE-218, Tong do tau haposan
- BE-219, Ise Do Alealenta
- BE-220, Ndang jumpang hian
- BE-221, Saleleng Jesuski, BL-005
- BE-222, Tu jolo ni Tuhanku
- BE-223, Husomba Ho Tuhan
- BE-224, Jalo tanganku
- BE-225, Ho o Tuhan, haholongan ni
- BE-226, Adong do hasonangan
- BE-227, Jesus ngolu ni
- BE-228, Jesus haposanku
- BE-229, Sai martua do sudena
- BE-230, Na malungun do rohangku
- BE-231, On ma na di rohangki, BL-013
- BE-232, Sian sude parulian na arga
- BE-233, Turena i manodo
- BE-234, Di rumang ni portibi on
- BE-235, Tumpalhu na umuli Ho

== Ende Taringot Tu Parungkilon (Hymns about the Struggles) ==
- BE-236, Jotjot do marsak, BL-007
- BE-237, Jesus Kristus do manobus
- BE-238, Ihuthon au sude hamu
- BE-239, Binsan ro asi ni roha
- BE-240, O hamuna na porsea
- BE-241, Asal ma Ibana
- BE-242, Rahis jala maol
- BE-243, Sai berengi partonggolan
- BE-244, Haburjuhon ma mangalo
- BE-245, Anggo didongani
- BE-246, Jesus, urupi
- BE-247, Sai hehe ma hamuna, hamu
- BE-248, Saleleng ho di tano on, BL-018
- BE-249, Ngot ma ho, o tondingki
- BE-250, Sai tostosi nasa ihot
- BE-251, Na monang i do
- BE-252, O Jesus sai dongan i, BL-006
- BE-253, Ale Debatangki
- BE-254, O Jesus, Sipangolu
- BE-255, Holan sada do na ringkot
- BE-256, Jesus Kristus i do Raja
- BE-257, Jonok Debatanta
- BE-258, Sai hutuju
- BE-259, Sai beta ma tondingku
- BE-260, Holan Jesus do hubaen
- BE-261, Bintang sipartogi
- BE-262, Jahowa Tuhanki
- BE-263, Tudos tu galumbang i
- BE-264, Sai togu au tu hasonangan
- BE-265, Mauliate, ale Tuhan
- BE-266, Tu banuaginjang do
- BE-267, O Tuhan, sulingkit
- BE-268, Debatangku do donganku
- BE-269, Mardalan au saonari
- BE-270, Ngot, ai torang do ari
- BE-271, Beta, beta hita
- BE-272, Sai tole, tole, ro sude
- BE-273, Jesus Tuhanku, rajai ma au – 2
- BE-273a, Jesus Tuhanku, rajai ma au
- BE-274, Ndang jadi ho mardalan
- BE-275, O Jesus Tuhanki
- BE-276, O Jesus, Siparmonang i
- BE-277, Marsada roha hita
- BE-278, Bangso na sumurung i

== Ende Pangapulon (Hymns of Consolation) ==
- BE-279, Pasahat ma sudena
- BE-280, Tongtong tutu na denggan do
- BE-281, Martua do na marhaposan
- BE-282, Tung beasa au holsoan
- BE-283, Nang sipata pe idaon
- BE-284, Sonang do rohangku
- BE-285, Sai ditongos Debatamu
- BE-286, Unang ma tangishon
- BE-287, Gaor pe sude humaliang
- BE-288, Na marguru do luhutna
- BE-289, Pos ma ho, rohangku
- BE-290, Ai beasa tung humolso
- BE-291, Binsar ma, binsar ma
- BE-292, Dung ro Jesus i
- BE-293, Habot pe roham
- BE-294, Unang sai holsoan ho – 2
- BE-294a, Unang sai holsoan ho
- BE-295, Holan di surgo i
- BE-296, Holso rohangku ditatap Ho
- BE-297, Na marsak roham
- BE-298, Di lambungMi, o Jesuski

== Ende Di Manogot (Hymns in the Morning) ==
- BE-299, Debata do manggomgomi
- BE-300, Sai hehe ma rohangku, BL-012
- BE-301, Las situtu rohangku
- BE-302, Binsar ma manogot on
- BE-303, O Jesus, sondang ni
- BE-304, Naeng ma pujionku
- BE-305, Ale tondingku, hehe ma
- BE-306, Hupuji Ho, ale Tuhanku
- BE-307, Mata ni ari
- BE-308, Jumolo ma hupuji Ho
- BE-309, Raphon Tuhan Jesus i

== Ende Jumpa Laho Mangan (Hymns at Lunch) ==
- BE-310, Tapuji ma Tuhanta dibaen, BL-012
- BE-311, Sai parmudumudu hami
- BE-312, Puji, o jolma
- BE-313, Hupuji Ho, o Tuhanki

== Ende Di Bodarina (Hymns in the Evening) ==
- BE-314, Na salpu do arian i, hupuji
- BE-315, Na salpu do arian i, soluk
- BE-316, Nunga lao muse sadari
- BE-317, Lao modom do luhut
- BE-318, Nunga loja dagingkon, BL-014
- BE-319, Tung sonang modom ahu
- BE-320, Maporus do arian i
- BE-321, Marujung do sadari on
- BE-322, O Jesus, Sipangolu au
- BE-323, Siparmahan bolon
- BE-324, Na ro do muse na holom
- BE-325, Bodari on
- BE-326, Ia loja au
- BE-327, Marujung do nuaeng saminggu
- BE-328, Naeng salpu ari Minggu

== Ende Taringot Tu Ajal Ni Jolma (Hymns about the Death of Man) ==
- BE-329, Jesus hinaposan ni
- BE-330, Di tano on mardagang au
- BE-331, Sai Kristus do ngolungku, BL-006
- BE-332, Binoto jonok ni adamhu
- BE-333, Sai banua ginjang do
- BE-334, Nasa jolma ingkon mate
- BE-335, Loas au, asa lao
- BE-336, Sonang ma modom
- BE-337, Molo giot ho tu ginjang
- BE-338, Hehe do muse pamatangkon
- BE-339, Diingot halak dagang, BL-010

== Ende Laho Mananom Dakdanak (Hymns at Children's Burial) ==
- BE-340, Tibu ma ro tingkingku

== Ende Taringot Tu Na Masa Sogot (Hymns about the Future) ==
- BE-341, Tibu ma jumpang
- BE-342, Ngot ma ho dijou soara
- BE-343, Jerusalem, ho huta na timbo
- BE-344, Ise do angka nasida
- BE-345, Di dia adian
- BE-346, Adong dope paradianan
- BE-347, Sai masipaidaan, BL-011
- BE-348, Lobi timbona dope
- BE-349, Hatiha na so salpu be, sobokkon
- BE-350, Hatiha na so salpu be, na las
- BE-351, Beha ma hita, ia
- BE-352, Sai hehe ma hamuna, na burju
- BE-353, Di Surgo hasongangan i
- BE-354, Sai tong maimaima do
- BE-355, Malungun do rohangki

== Ende Psalm (Hymns of Psalms) ==
- BE-356, Na malungun do rohangku
- BE-357, Songon ursa na binuru
- BE-358, Hamu saluhut harajaon
- BE-359, Sai hehe ma Tuhanta i
- BE-360, Tongtong longang do rohangkon
- BE-361, Na denggan situtu do
- BE-362, Endehon ende na imbaru
- BE-363, Mauliate dok hamuna
- BE-364, Sai huranapi dolok i
- BE-365, Haleluya, puji ma

== Ende Di Dakdanak (Hymns of Childhood) ==
- BE-366, O ale Jesus Tuhanki
- BE-367, Di banua ginjang, BL-002
- BE-368, Tuhan Jesus, Tuhan Jesus
- BE-369, Na marhahaanggi
- BE-370, Naeng haholonganku, BL-001
- BE-371, Burju ma hita mardalani

== Ende Parujungan (Ending Hymns) ==
- BE-372, Rohangku sai halashon ma
- BE-373, Mangula hita jolma

== Buku Ende Haluaon na Gok (II) ==
Below are the hymns of Buku Ende printed in the second edition of 1933.

== Dijou Tuhan i do Ho! (The Lord is Calling You!) ==
- BE-374, Jesus manjou ho
- BE-375, Adong do hasonangan – 2
- BE-376, Ise na di pintu i
- BE-377, Ro ma hamu sudena
- BE-378, Sai dijanghon Jesus i
- BE-379, Ndang sadihari
- BE-380, So ma jolo ise i
- BE-381, Di dia Jesus
- BE-382, Sangga ro di haroroNa
- BE-383, Adong do ama
- BE-384, Ro ma hamu, rade
- BE-385, Dijouhon Jesus ro
- BE-386, O dangol ni hapariron i
- BE-387, Hatop ma ho ro
- BE-388, So ma jolo jala pingkir
- BE-389, Ale dongan ro tu Jesus
- BE-390, Nunga sae dosam
- BE-391, Sotung ditulak
- BE-392, Sai pasiat Tuhan Jesus
- BE-393, Las ni roha bolon i

== Dapothon Ma Jesus (Come to Jesus) ==
- BE-394, O Jesus Tuhanki
- BE-395, Masuk ma Ho
- BE-396, Nunga talu musumuna
- BE-397, Nda nunga salpu borngin i
- BE-398, Beha na so mardame
- BE-399, Unang tarlalap di hata
- BE-400, O ho di hamagoanmi
- BE-401, Boasa sai tong di na alang
- BE-402, Ndang na di roham
- BE-403, Pos rohangku di Tuhanku
- BE-404, Unang ho sai di na holom

== Bereng Tuhanmu Di Silang I! (Look at your Crucified Lord!) ==
- BE-405, Adong sada mual
- BE-406, Di lambung ni parsilang
- BE-407, Panotnoti ma Silang
- BE-408, Bornginna i
- BE-409, Angka biru-biru
- BE-410, Na ro ma sahalak
- BE-411, Nang pe rara dosamu
- BE-412, Ndi di dolok adui
- BE-413, Hutanda haporusanki
- BE-414, Ingot na tau
- BE-415, Ai naeng malua ho
- BE-416, Tujolom o Debatangku – 2

== Topoti Dosam! (Confess Your Sins!) ==
- BE-417, Rade situtu haluaon
- BE-418, Sasude hadosaonmu
- BE-419, Ho na marsak roha i
- BE-420, Huboan do dosangku
- BE-421, Marsomba au di joloM on
- BE-422, Na ro do au
- BE-423, Na ro ma borngin i
- BE-424, Soara ni tondi

== Auhon PanghophopNa i! (I am the Redeemer!) ==
- BE-425, Batu mamak di au on
- BE-426, Tutu na mate Jesus i
- BE-427, Marserep, marunduk ni roha
- BE-428, Ho na loja ho na sorat
- BE-429, Portibi torus binolus
- BE-430, Ai ditanda ho mual i
- BE-431, Adong najolo sada ina
- BE-432, Sian hurungan ni dosangki
- BE-433, O Tuhanki sai topot au
- BE-434, Tuhan Jesus bereng au

== Puji Sihophop Ho! (Praise your Redeemer!) ==
- BE-435, Marolopolop Tondingki
- BE-436, Ai adong do Tuhanku
- BE-437, Tung na muba rohangku
- BE-438, Beta sai taendehon
- BE-439, Las ni rohangkon
- BE-440, Sai puji ma Tuhanta
- BE-441, Di au Tuhan Jesus
- BE-442, Najolo Tung Na Loja
- BE-443, Dung Tuhan Jesus
- BE-444, Bona Ni Ngolungku
- BE-445, Sai Ingoton Ni Rohangku
- BE-446, Ho Ma Di Au
- BE-447, Ho Mual Hangoluan I
- BE-448, O Tuhan Jesus Ho Do Mamorsan
- BE-449, Sai Solhot Tu Silang Mi
- BE-450, Tung Na Tarapul Do
- BE-451, O Tuhanki Di GoarMi
- BE-452, Na Ro Pandaoni Bolon I
- BE-453, Sada Goar Na Ummuli
- BE-454, O Tuhan Jesus Holong
- BE-455, Tung Na Ringkot
- BE-456, O Tuhanku Ho Jambarhu
- BE-457, Bagas Ni Haholongan
- BE-458, Barita Na Ummuli
- BE-459, Sonang Do Langkalangkangku
- BE-460, Ala Ni Tuhan Jesus

== Gok Tondi ma Hamu! (Be Filled with the Spirit!) ==
- BE-461, Songgop Tu Hami
- BE-462, Ale Tondi Porbadia
- BE-463, PasupasuM TongosonMu
- BE-464, Huboan Ma Diringku
- BE-465, Pasupasu LehononMu
- BE-466, Nunga Ro Au
- BE-467, Asi Ni Roham Hupuji

== Marparange di Ngolu na Imbaru (Behaving in the New Life) ==
- BE-468, Di Ganup Luat Mian
- BE-469, Di Dia Ahu Tu Dia
- BE-470, Jesus, Ho Nampuna Au
- BE-471, Hupillit Jesus Donganki
- BE-472, Sai Malungun Do
- BE-473, Ariari Sai Ramoti
- BE-474, Ingkon Jesus Do Donganku
- BE-475, Ho Tongtong Ihuthononku
- BE-476, Ndada Au Guru Di Au
- BE-477, Mansai Lan Habiaran
- BE-478, Dohot Siholhu Paherbang
- BE-479, Jonok Lam Jonok
- BE-480, Songon Sada Batang Aek
- BE-481, Godang Dope Siguruhononmi
- BE-482, Asa On Ma Na Tutu
- BE-483, Tuhanta I Do Tuat
- BE-484, O Tuhan, Au Ma DonganMi
- BE-485, Dongani Au Tuhan
- BE-486, Jesus Ro Ma Ho Tu Au
- BE-487, Tung Halak Na Margogo
- BE-488, Nang Na Buni Di Roha

== Disarihon Do Ho! (You are Taken Care Of!) ==
- BE-489, Sai Haposi Tuhanmi
- BE-490, Nang Gunsang Pe Galumbang
- BE-491, O Jesus Tuhannami I
- BE-492, Na Mora Tutu
- BE-493, Naeng Modom Do Sudena
- BE-494, Holom Bornginna I
- BE-495, Maringan Do Di Surgo I
- BE-496, Sion Paradiananta
- BE-497, Di Na Humolso Rohangki
- BE-498, Buni Pe Dalan I
- BE-499, Ale Dongan Sai Tangihon
- BE-500, Tingganghon Sude
- BE-501, Sai Ditogutogu Jesus
  - Lyrics: All the Way My Savior Leads Me by Fanny J. Crosby (1875)
  - Melody: Robert Lowry (1826-1899)
- BE-502, Jahowa Siparmahan Au
- BE-503, Na Loja Ho, O Donganki
- BE-504, Ditogu Tuhan Jesus Au
  - Lyrics: He Leadeth Me by Joseph A. Gilmore (1834-1918)
  - Melody: William B. Bradbury (1816-1868)
- BE-505, Jesus Do Manogu Au
- BE-506, Dame Na Gok
- BE-507, Habangsa Parasian I
- BE-508, Sai Patogu Rohangki
  - Lyrics and Melody: Holy Spirit, Faithful Guide by Marcus M. Wells (1815-1895)
- BE-509, Lao Malos Duhut I
  - Lyrics: Verses 1-2 by Wuppertal, verses 3-4 by Karl Kuhlo (1818-1909)

== Sosoi Donganmu Masuk! (Invite your Friends in!) ==
- BE-510, Silu Soso I Ma Donganmu
- BE-511, Ai Tagamon Idaonku
- BE-512, Didalani Jesus Tano
- BE-513, Bidang Situtu Sisabion I
- BE-514, Sai Lului Dongan Na Mago
- BE-515, Ringgas Ma Tapaboa
- BE-516, Bege Joujou Ni Jesus I
- BE-517, Di Dia Angka Jolma
- BE-518, Marsinondang Dibaen Jesus
- BE-519, Tarbege Do Panjou Ni Kristus

== Na Di Ginjang I Ma Lului! (Look for the One who is in Heaven!) ==
- BE-520, Partangisan Do Hape
- BE-521, Sambulom, Sambulom
- BE-522, Surgo I Sambulonta Do I
- BE-523, Aning Andigan
- BE-524, Ise Naeng Sahat Tu Surgo I
- BE-525, Na Laho Ma Au
- BE-526, Tongam Ni Huta I
- BE-527, Saluhut Do Hutadinghon
- BE-528, Tudia Ho Dung Mate Ho
- BE-529, Angka Naung Monding
- BE-530, Tu Sambulo Ni Tondingku
- BE-531, Sai Uluhon Au, O Tuhan
- BE-532, Molo Marsinondang Bintang
- BE-533, Hutanda Sada Huta I
- BE-534, Di Ginjang Di Surgo
- BE-535, Hamatean Parhitean

== Rade Managam Tuhanmu! (Ready to Expect Your Lord!) ==
- BE-536, Ditangihon Tuhan I
- BE-537, Hobas Ho Panabi
- BE-538, Aek Beha Gira Manogot
- BE-539, Sai Hutagam Do Tuhanku
- BE-540, Tuhan Jesus
- BE-541, Na Mulak Jesus I
- BE-542, O Ale Tuhan Di Dia Ho
- BE-543, Buni Bingkas Ni Holong
- BE-544, Molo Ro Panjou Ni Tuhan
- BE-545, Na Saor Do Hita Be
- BE-546, Tung Martua Do

== Ende Dakdanak (Hymns for the Children ==
- BE-547, Loas Ro Tu Au Dakdanak
- BE-548, Dakdanak na badia i
- BE-549, Holan Dakdanak
- BE-550, Tanganku Na Metmet

== Ende Kanon (Hymns of Canons) ==
- BE-551, Ita Puji Ma Tuhanta
- BE-552, Na Lao Au Tu Na Dao
- BE-553, Las Roham Di Debata
- BE-554, Puji Hamu Sai Pasangap
- BE-555, Tuhanku Di Au
- BE-556, DameM lehon Ma Di Hami

== Marhaluaon Na Gok (Perfect Salvation) ==
- BE 557 DAO DUMENGGAN
- BE 558 DEBATA AMA DI SURGO
- BE 559 DEBATA NA SONGKAL JALA NA BADIA
- BE 560 ENDEHON AMEN
- BE 561 Endehon Debata
- BE 562 HAMUNA ALE JOLMA
- BE 563 ITA PUJI DEBATA
- BE 564 LAS MA ROHANTA DI TUHANTA DEBATA
- BE 565 LAS ROHANGKU LAO MAMUJI
- BE 566, Na Badia
- BE 567 NA MORA DO TUHANTA I
- BE 568A NASA SOARA INGKON DO (1)
- BE 568B NASA SOARA INGKON DO (2)
- BE 569 O DEBATA TUNG LONGANG DO ROHANGKU
- BE 570 O JESUS TUHANKI HUPUJI HO
- BE 571 PARANGAN PARDISURGO
- BE 572 PUJI
- BE 573 PUJI JESUS SIPALUA
- BE 574 PUJI MA DEBATA
- BE 575 PUJI MA DEBATA NA SONGKAL
- BE 576 PUJI MA DEBATANTA
- BE 577 PUJI TUHAN DEBATA
- BE 578 PUJI TUHAN DI HOLONGNA
- BE 579 PUJI TUHAN HALELUYA
- BE 580 RO DO AU TUHAN TU HO

== Buku Ende Sangap Di Jahowa (III) ==
Below are the hymns of Buku Ende printed in the second edition of 1933.

- BE-581, Sangap di Jahowa
- BE-582 SANGAP MA DI DEBATA
- BE-583Sangap Ma Di Debatanta
- BE-584 SALUHUT BANGSO
- BE-585 SOMBA MA JAHOWA
- BE-586 SOMBAONKU HO O JESUS
- BE-587 TAENDEHON LAS NI ROHA
- BE-588, Tasomba Tongtong
- BE-589, Tuhan Sai Ro Ma Ho
- BE-590 ADVENT
- BE-591, Boru Sion
- BE-592 HOSIANNA DI ANAK NI RAJA DAUD
- BE-593, Na Hinirim Na Sai Laon
- BE-594, Sai Ro Ma Ho Immanuel

=== Natal (Christmas) ===
- BE-595, Ai Ise Poso-poso On
- BE-596, Ai Songon On Holong Ni Debatanta I
- BE-597A, Baritahon Di Dolok
- BE-597B, Baritahon Di Dolok
- BE-598, Bege Ende Ni Suruan
- BE-599 DITADINGKON HABANGSANA
- BE-600, Diborngin Na Sasada I
- BE-601, Di Huta Ni Raja Daud
- BE-602, Di Natal Na Parjolo I
- BE-603A DIPANGGAGATAN I
- BE-603B, Dipanggagatan I
- BE-604, Ganup Ari Natal
- BE-605, Las Ma Roham
- BE-606, Nunga Sorang Mesias I
- BE-607, Nunga Tubu Kristus I
- BE-608, O Betlehem Na Metmet I
- BE-609 O JESUS NA METMET
- BE-610, Pasangap Ma
- BE-611, Peak Tuhanta Di Panggagatan
- BE-612, Sai Paherbang Ma Habongmu
- BE-613 RO MA HO O JESUS
- BE-614 RO MA HO TU AU
- BE-615, Tarbege Surusuruan Marende
- BE-616, Uli Na I Diborngin Na Badia
- BE-617, Sian Purba Do Hami Ro

=== Sitaonon Dohot Hamamate Ni Tuhan Jesus (The Passion and Death of Lord Jesus) ===
- BE-618, Di Dia Ho
- BE-619 Di Golgota
- BE-620 Holongmi Ale Tuhanku
- BE-621 Mabugang Ho
- BE-622 Mansai Nalnal Di Angka Partingkian
- BE-623, Tarsilang Ho

=== Haheheon Ni Tuhan Jesus (The Resurrection of Lord Jesus) ===
- BE-624 HALELUYA, HALELUYA
- BE-625, Holom Sogot Manogot I
- BE-626 HOLOM TANOMAN I
- BE-627 JESUS NAUNG HEHE
- BE-628 LANGIT NANG TANO TIUR SASUDE
- BE-629, Lao Do Au Tu Tanoman I
- BE-630 Marlas Ni Roha Hita On
- BE-631 NAUNG HEHE DO TUHANTA (KANON)
- BE-632 NUNGA HEHE KRISTUS
- BE-633, Nunga Hehe Kristus I
- BE-634 NUNGA HEHE TUHAN I
- BE-635 RO TUHAN JESUS
- BE-636 JESUS DO RAJA BOLON I
- BE-637A PATIMBUL MA HUASO NI GOAR NI JESUS I (1)
- BE-637B PATIMBUL MA HUASO NI GOAR NI JESUS I (2)
- BE-638 PATIMBUL TUHAN I
- BE-639 BUNGA NI GARA I
- BE-640, Haholongon Sian Ginjang
- BE-641 O TONDI PORBADIA I
- BE-642 O TONDI PORBADIA I
- BE-643 RO HO TONDI PORBADIA
- BE-644 RO HO O TONDI PORBADIA I
- BE-645 RO MA HO PARASIROHA
- BE-646A SAI GOHI ROHA TONDINGKI (1)
- BE-646B SAI GOHI ROHA TONDINGKI (2)
- BE-647 DI DEBATA AMANTA I
- BE-648 SANGAP DI DEBATA AMA
- BE-649 DIPASADA AMA I.
- BE-650 DIPASADA HOLONGNA I
- BE-651 HURIA NA HUHAHOLONGI HAMI
- BE-652 IHOT MA HAMI
- BE-653 JUBILEUM NI HURIA
- BE-654 MARPUNGU SUDE
- BE-655 OJAHAN NI HURIA.
- BE-656 PARHAHAMARANGGION
- BE-657 ULI NA I HURIAMI
- BE-658 TU PORTIBION NA RUNDUT
- BE-659 ANGKA PARBEGU NA DI HAHOLOMON
- BE-660 BEGE MA TUHAN I
- BE-661 BETA HITA ALE ANGKA DONGAN
- BE-662 BOAN SINONDANGMI
- BE-663 BOTO MA SUDE HAMU
- BE-664 DIDOK TUHAN JESUS
- BE-665 HEHE HO MARSINONDANG
- BE-666 INGKON BOANONTA BARITA
- BE-667 ISE MA ANGKA PANABI
- BE-668 PARROHAI MA AU TUHAN
- BE-669 RINGGAS AU PABOAHON
- BE-670 TARBEGE SOARA NA JOUJOU
- BE-671 TOROP DOPE NA LILU
- BE-672 TUNG GODANG SITUTU
- BE-673 ADONG SADA MUAL I.
- BE-674 DIHAHOLONGI DO HO
- BE-675 HAMU SUDE NA SORAT I
- BE-676 SADA LANGKA PARHOLANGAN
- BE-677 MANSAI LAMBOK
- BE-678 PAUBA ROHAM
- BE-679 TUNG DANGOL DO HO O JOLMA
- BE-680 SAI TOGIHON AU MULAK
- BE-681 ALE AMANG ASI ROHAM
- BE-682 ALE TUHAN ASI ROHAM
- BE-683 Di Adopanmu Jesus
- BE-684 LEA SITUTU
- BE-685 PAHEHE AU ON
- BE-686 RAMUN DO AU
- BE-687 SILANGMI O TUHAN
- BE-688 TUHAN
- BE-689 DIHOLONG ROHANA
- BE-690 HIBUL ROHANGKU
- BE-691 HUPASAHAT MA TU JESUS
- BE-692 HUPASAHAT TU TANGANMU
- BE-693 JESUS DO TUHAN
- BE-694 JESUS HO NAMPUNA AU
- BE-695 JESUS TUHANKU DI HO MA AU ON
- BE-696 LAM HOLONG ROHANGKI
- BE-697 MOLO HO DO HUIHOTHON
- BE-698 SAI IHUTHONONKU JESUS
- BE-699 SINGKOP DO ASI NI ROHAM
- BE-700 TOGU AU O TUHAN
- BE-701 TU HO DO AU MARPADAN
- BE-702 PANGAN MA ROTI ON
- BE-703 RAP MA HITA LAO MANGANHON
- BE-704 BASA DO HO
- BE-705 GOAR NI TUHAN JESUS
- BE-706 GODANG NI PASU-PASU I
- BE-707 HAGOGOON DOHOT APUL-APUL
- BE-708 JESUS HO DO SIPALUA I
- BE-709 JESUS MANGASI I AU
- BE-710 MAROLOP-OLOP DO AU
- BE-711 SONGON URSA NA BINURU
- BE-712 TOGU AU ALE JAHOWA
- BE-713 TOGU AU O TUHANKI
- BE-714 TUHAN NA MARMAHAN HAMI
- BE-715 BALGA DO HOLONGMI
- BE-716 DI NA MAMOLUS SANDOK NGOLUON
- BE-717 DI NA HUTATAP SILANG I.
- BE-718 HUBEGE JESUS MANJOU
- BE-719 HUBEGE SOARAM O JESUS
- BE-720 NAENG MARSINONDANG NGOLUNGKU.
- BE-721 O DEBATA URASI
- BE-722 TU JOLOMI TUHANKU
- BE-723 TU JOLOM O TUHAN
- BE-724 TUHAN BAEN MA NGOLUNGKON
- BE-725 AI SITIRUON DO HULEHON TU HAMU
- BE-726 HAMU JINOU NI TUHANTA
- BE-727 HUPILLIT ASA MARPARBUE
- BE-728 HUSURU HO
- BE-729 LAHO MA HAMU
- BE-730 SAI PATAU MA AU TUHAN.
- BE-731 BENGET MA HO
- BE-732 DI LAS NI ROHA NANG SITAONON
- BE-733 DULO MA AU ON O TUHAN
- BE-734 GOLAP SITUTU
- BE-735 HOHOM MA HO
- BE-736 JESUS HAPOSANKU
- BE-737 JESUS PANGAMUDI
- BE-738A LAM JONOK ROHANGKI (1)
- BE-738B LAM JONOK ROHANGKI (2)
- BE-739 LUGAHON MA SOLUMI
- BE-740 NANG PUR PE HABAHABA I
- BE-741 NANG RO PE HABA-HABA
- BE-742 NDANG HOLAN SIPALUA I
- BE-743 O TUHAN TOGU-TOGU MA
- BE-744 RAP DOHOT AU
- BE-745 RO PE HABAHABA
- BE-746 SABAM MA HO
- BE-747 SAI HUNANGKOHI DOLOK I
- BE-748 SONANG MA HO
- BE-749 SONGON SORHA NI PODATI
- BE-750 TU TONDINGKON O JESUS
- BE-751 TUHAN NA SUN GOGO I
- BE-752 TUHAN, PATULUS MA SANGKAPMI
- BE-753 DI PARDALANAN JESUS DI JOLONGKU
- BE-754 GOK LAS NI ROHA DO AU
- BE-755 HAPOSAN HO TUHAN
- BE-756 HUBOTO DO
- BE-757 ISE DO NA NAENG MARTUA
- BE-758 JAHOWA PANGURUPI
- BE-759 JAHOWA SIPARMAHAN AU
- BE-760 JESUS DO ALE-ALENGKU
- BE-761 MARTUA NA PORSEA
- BE-762 MASIHOL DO ROHANGKU
- BE-763 MOLO JESUS DONGANMI
- BE-764 MOLO SO MAR-TUHAN HO
- BE-765 NANG PE MUNSAT ANGKA DOLOK
- BE-766 PADAN NA ULI
- BE-767 SONGON AEK NA MABAOR
- BE-768 SUNGKUN-SUNGKUN DO ROHANGKI
- BE-769 TU DEBATA DO PANGHIRIMON
- BE-770 TU DEBATAMI
- BE-771 TUDOSHON PIDONG NA HABANG
- BE-772 TUHANKU DO PATURE DALANHI
- BE-773 TUHAN MATA NI ARINGKU
- BE-774 TUNG MABAOR SIAN HO
- BE-775 UNANG HOLSOAN
- BE-776 UNANG HOLSOAN HO
- BE-777 UNANG SAI HOLSOAN HO.
- BE-778 AI ISE DO TUMOMPA ANGKA BUNGA
- BE-779 AMPORIK NA METMET
- BE-780 PIGA MA TOROP NI BINTANG
- BE-781 SAI HALASHON NA TINOMPA
- BE-782 TUHAN DEBATANTA
- BE-783 TUHAN SITOMPA SALUHUT
- BE-784 AHA DO NAUNG HUBAEN TUHAN,
- BE-785 ALO PANGUNJUNAN
- BE-786 DIGOMGOMANMI O TUHAN
- BE-787 INGKON MONANG HITA
- BE-788 LAS MA ROHAMU MANGKIRIM
- BE-789 LULUI HAMU HARAJAON NI DEBATA
- BE-790 MARLAS ROHA MA HAMU
- BE-791 O HAMU PARANGAN
- BE-792 PASU-PASU HAMI O TUHAN
- BE-793 POS MA ROHAM
- BE-794 RO MA HO TUHAN (1)
- BE-795 RO MA HO TUHAN (2)
- BE-796A ASI NI ROHANA
- BE-796B ASI NI ROHAM DO
- BE-797 JESUS PARMAHAN I
- BE-798 NATORAS BEGE HATA ON
- BE-799 MARS NHKBP
- BE-800 PABOA TU DAKDANAK I
- BE-801 O DAKDANAK, SOMBA DEBATANTA
- BE-802 PANGKE TINGKIM SAONARI
- BE-803 PELEHON HAPISTARAN
- BE-804 RIPE NAMARLAS NI ROHA
- BE-805 MOLO ADONG TINGKI PAJUMPANG
- BE-806 AHA PE MASA DINGOLUMON
- BE-807 DEBATA MA MANDONGANI HO
- BE-808 HORAS MA HITA SUDE
- BE-809 MOLO SAUT MA HO
- BE-810 SAI DAME MA DI HAMUNA
- BE-811 DI AU MA HO TUHAN
- BE-812 O TONDINGKU BETA MA
- BE-813 PANGIDO HAMU MA
- BE-814 SAI AJARI AU TUHANKU
- BE-815 ULI DO TINGKI NA HOHOM
- BE-816 DUNG SALPU BORNGIN
- BE-817 LAMBOK SONDANG NI BULAN
- BE-818 LONGANG AU
- BE-819 NAUNG BINSAR PANONDANG
- BE-820 PANGKE MA TINGKIM
- BE-821 RAP MA HITA ALE TUHAN
- BE-822 SADARION
- BE-823 SALPU ARI BORNGIN RO
- BE-824 TUHAN DONGANI HAMI
- BE-825 BUKU NA BADIA
- BE-826 GOHI AU TUHAN
- BE-827 MARBUNGARAN HATA I
- BE-828 PANGKULINGI AHU ALE TUHANHI
- BE-829 PATIK NA IMBARU
- BE-830 SAI PAHOHOM MA ROHANGKU
- BE-831 TUNG JOTJOT AU
- BE-832 PINTU NA SASADA
- BE-833 DI NA MASIPAIDAAN
- BE-834 NA MASIHOL DO ROHANGKU
- BE-835 NUNGA LAO, NUNGA LAO
- BE-836 NUNGA LOJA AU O TUHAN
- BE-837 SADA HUTA NA MANSAI ULI
- BE-838 UNANG SUNGKUN BE TU AHU
- BE-839 ULI NI TINGKI I

==== Ende Liturgi (Hymns of Liturgy) ====
- BE-840 Ale Amanami
- BE-841 Ai Ho Do Nampuna Harajaon
- BE-842 Amen (2X)
  - German Liturgy
- BE-843 Amen (2X)
  - Church Tradition
- BE-844 Amen (3X)
  - Denmark Liturgy
- BE-845 Amen (3X) HKBP
  - 1930 Dutch Liturgy
- BE-846 Amen (4X)
- BE-847 Debata Amanta
- BE-848 Dison Adong Huboan Tuhan
- BE-849 Dok Mauliate
- BE-850, Endehon Ma Haleluya
- BE-851, Haleluya (3X)
- BE-852, Haleluya (3X) HKBP
- BE-853, Haleluya (12X)
- BE-854, Haleluya Puji Tuhan
- BE-855 Huboan Pelean
- BE-856 Hupasahat Husombahon Pelean
- BE-857 Husomba Ho Tuhan
- BE-858 Jesus Kristus
- BE-859 Mauliate Ma Tuhan
- BE-860, Mauliate, Puji Tuhan
- BE-861, Tuhan Asi Roham
- BE-862, Tuhan Jesus Kristus Asi Ma Roham
- BE-863, Sangap di Debata

==== Ende Parujungan (Ending Hymn) ====
- BE-864, Oikumene (Ende UEM*)
