= Alexander Hassé =

- Born: Alexander Cossart Hassé; 30 December 1813; Fulneck, Leeds, Yorkshire
- Died: 12 December 1894; Ockbrook, Derbyshire, England
- Church: Moravian
- Title: Bishop

Alexander Cossart Hassé (30 December 1813 – 12 December 1894) was a British bishop in the Moravian Church. He contributed to the monthly magazine The Fraternal Messenger. He is the author of The United Brethren (Moravians) in England. Hassé was also a botanist.

== Life ==
Hassé was born in Fulneck Moravian Settlement, Leeds, Yorkshire to organist and composer Christian Frederick Hassé and Ann Cossart. His father was an ethnic German from the Moravian community in Old Sarepta, Russian Empire. His paternal great-grandparents were Johann Adolph Hasse and Faustina Bordoni.

Hassé was a deacon of the Moravian Church in 1844 and by 1883 he was Bishop. He was a collector of plant specimens in Silesia.
