= Johann Joseph Thalherr =

Austro-Hungarian architect (1730–1801)

- Born: 1730; Fulnek, Moravia
- Died: 16 October 1801 (aged 70–71); Buda, Kingdom of Hungary
- Occupation: Architect

Johann Joseph Thalherr (or Talherr; Czech: Jan Josef Talherr, Hungarian: József Talherr; 1730 – 16 October 1801) was an Austrian architect.

== Life ==
Thalherr was born in Fulnek, Moravia (now Czech Republic). He studied architecture in Vienna and, after graduation, worked there as court architect, under the direction of Isidore Canevale.

In 1782 he moved to Buda (now Budapest, Hungary) and worked as chamber-architect, being promoted chief of the Hungarian Direction of Constructions, and remained there until his death. He is one of the main representatives of the Palladian revival in Central Europe. His constructions can be found in Budapest, Bratislava, Győr and several other Hungarian cities.

== Main works ==
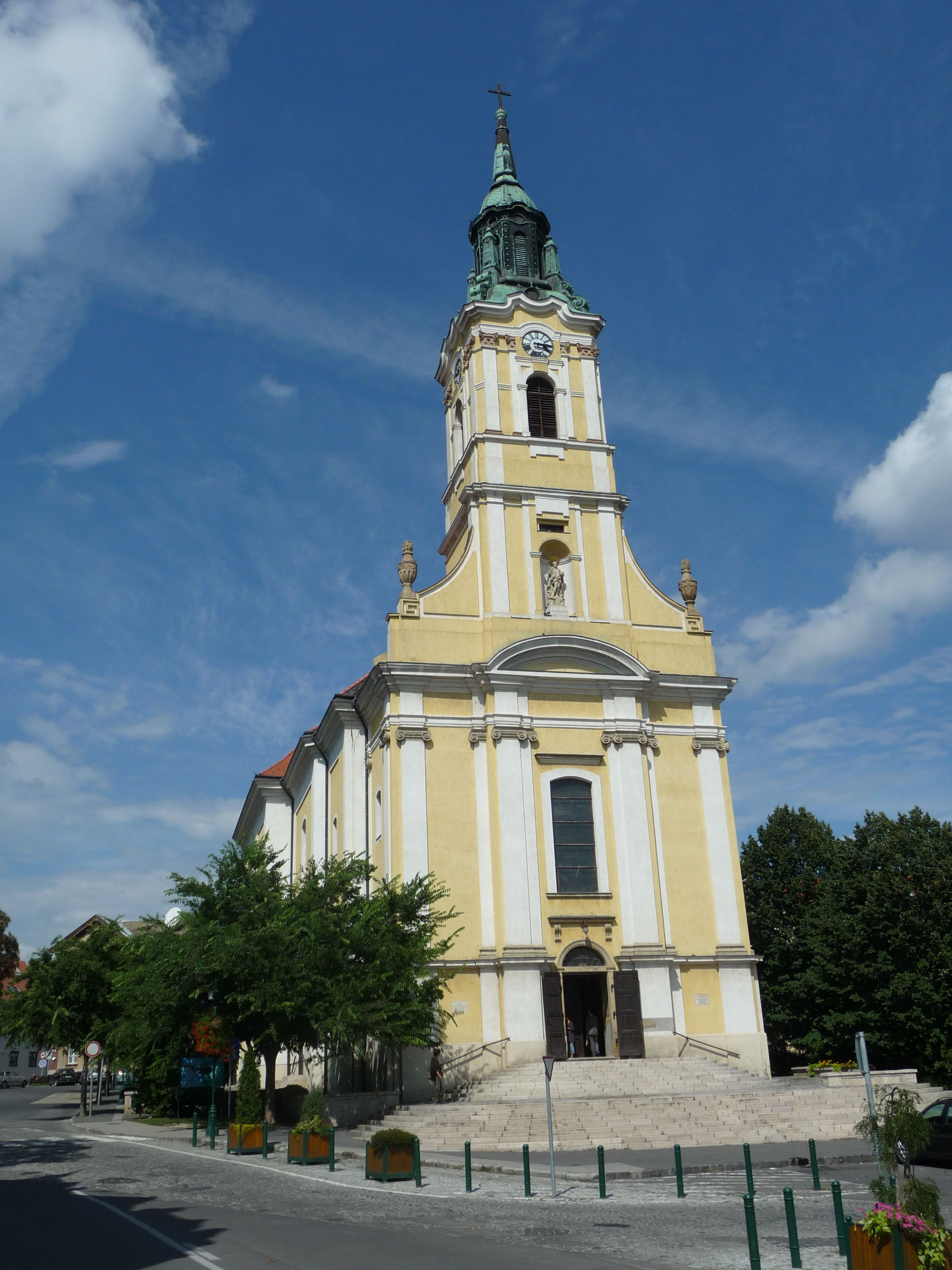
Catholic church in Szekszárd (1794)

- Silk factory (Filatorium), Budapest, (1785)
- Catholic church in Szekszárd (1794)
- St. Joseph Church, Budapest (1798)
