= Fulneck Moravian Church =

Church in Leeds, England

Coordinates: 53.783729°N 1.664794°W

Fulneck Moravian Church and its associated settlement were established on the Fulneck estate, Pudsey, in the West Riding of Yorkshire, England, in 1744 by Count Nicolaus Ludwig von Zinzendorf, a Moravian Bishop and Lutheran priest, following a donation of land by the evangelical Anglican clergyman, Benjamin Ingham. Fulneck is now part of the City of Leeds, West Yorkshire.

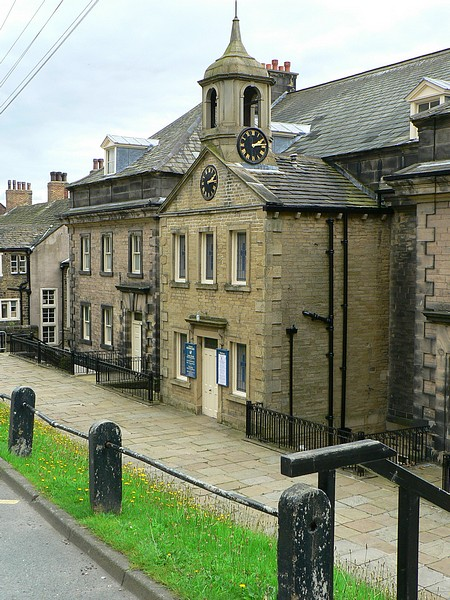
The front of Fulneck Moravian Church

== History ==
=== Foundation ===
Representatives of the Moravian Church, descended from the Bohemian Brethren's Church of 1457 and renewed in 1722 in Saxony under the leadership of Count Nicolaus Ludwig von Zinzendorf, first came to England in 1728 and 1734 to establish good relations with the Church of England and to help organise missionary work in the American colonies. In 1738, a Moravian Society was established at Fetter Lane, London. With this Society were associated for a while John Wesley and his brother Charles.

In Yorkshire, Benjamin Ingham, an evangelical priest of the Church of England, had created many small groups of fervent Christians. Unable to support them all himself, he sought help from the Moravians. Br John Toeltschig from Herrnhut on Zinzendorf's estates in Saxony visited Ingham in November 1739 but it was not until 26 May 1742 that the Moravian Bishop August Gottlieb Spangenberg, with the support of the Fetter Lane Society, agreed to establish a 'Yorkshire Congregation' for this work. In July 1742, the Moravians established a headquarters at Smith House, a farmhouse near Halifax. A Moravian family by the name of Gussenbauer were sent to work in Pudsey and took up residence at Bankhouse at the western end of the Falneck ridge. In February 1743, Zinzendorf arrived in Yorkshire and went to see the Gussenbauers as their child was seriously ill. Impressed by the vista from Falneck, he decided to build a settlement there on the model of the one established at Herrnhaag in the Wetterau in west-central Germany. Ingham obliged by buying the estate and donating part of it to them for building.

=== Name of the settlement ===
The Moravians originally called Fulneck "Lamb’s Hill", which referred to two aspects of the Book of Revelation, i.e. the Lamb of God and the City Set Upon a Hill. This name was used between 1744 and 1760 and from 1750 until 1763 the church building was known as Grace Hall. After that the name Fulneck was adopted. This was partly because it was similar to the estate's original English name, Falneck or Falnake (a contraction of "Fallen Oak") but also as a tribute to Bishop John Amos Comenius, who had ministered to the Bohemian Brethren in Fulnek, Moravia, during the Counter Reformation. In 1661, Comenius had commended the dying Unitas Fratrum to the care of King Charles II and the Church of England in his "Exhortation of the Churches of Bohemia to the Church of England".

=== Moravian settlement system ===
In the eighteenth century, the Moravian Church had settlements which were largely self-contained communities. The settlements usually had a chapel, a Single Brethren's House, a Single Sisters’ House, a Widows’ House, schools and an inn. Single members would live, work and worship together in their communal Houses. A settlement might have its own doctor, bakery, shop, farm, shoe makers, glove makers and carpenters. These businesses – for the common good rather than private profit – were known as ‘diaconies’. The congregation was organised into Choirs, e.g., the Married Choir, the Single Sisters’ Choir, the Great Girls’ Choir and the Little Girls’ Choir, each of which was a sub-community serving Christ in its own way.

=== Building the settlement ===
The settlement was built on land given to the Moravians by Benjamin Ingham. The land was acquired in January 1744 and the decision to build there was taken in May 1745. Building of the Congregation House, known as ‘Grace Hall’ and which included the chapel, began in 1746. The edifice was consecrated on 2 June 1748.

The building followed a style that was then typical of the Moravians. There was no clear distinction between residential accommodation for congregation labourers and the chapel. Rather, a hall in the centre of the residence served as a space for communal worship. The hall occupied the central part of the first and second floors of the building and was distinguished by a single row of tall windows. The natural lighting, furnishing and decor of the hall have been described as giving a ‘lightness of touch’ and a ‘sense of rest and stillness’ while ‘the organ’s exuberant fretwork case increased the elegance’. The hall had no altar, font or pulpit. The leader of worship sat behind a table, flanked by his fellow pastoral workers. The congregation sat in their choirs, with the sexes separated and sitting adjacent to the entrances from their single choir houses.

Ingham disapproved of the imposing buildings, describing them as "finer than my Lord Huntingdon's house". Podmore ascribes this grandeur to Zinzendorf's aristocratic sense of style and notes that the buildings attracted a stream of distinguished visitors including "gentry, baronets, peers, MPs and the Dean of Carlisle". Moravian historian Peter Zimmerling of Leipzig says that Moravian settlements were deliberately built on a grand scale with stately public buildings because they were to indicate that these "towns of the Lord" were noble in their purpose, serving as way-stations for the Moravian missionaries and evangelists and supporting their work and sending them out.

=== Choir Houses ===
A number of brethren's and sisters' houses were quickly established at Fulneck and in 1752, two great choir houses were built. At the west end of the quarter-mile long terrace stood the Single Brethren's House and at the east end the Single Sisters’ House. These also had recreational gardens that ran down the slope in front of the terrace. The front door of these choir houses opened into a dining room. A central staircase led up to the first floor, where there was a choir hall for meetings. The first and second floor had a number of work and living rooms. The third floor consisted of a single open-plan dormitory. "The spirit of these houses was of cleanliness and order, of work and godly conversation, of frugal living in surroundings of some grandeur, and above all of stillness". The building of a Widows’ House followed in 1763, then a shop and inn in 1771 and a cupola was added to the church in 1779. In 1754 between eighty and ninety people occupied the choir houses.

=== Br James Charlesworth ===
The warden of the Single Brethren's Choir at Fulneck in 1751, James Charlesworth, was a "man of superior business ability" who succeeded in raising money to help stave off the bankruptcy of the whole Moravian Church in the face of its burgeoning missionary work. Br Charlesworth had developed a cloth weaving business for the benefit of the church and traded with Portugal and Russia. In 1754, Br Charlesworth was also able to effect a reconciliation between Zinzendorf and Ingham, the former owner of the Fulneck estate.

=== God's Acre ===
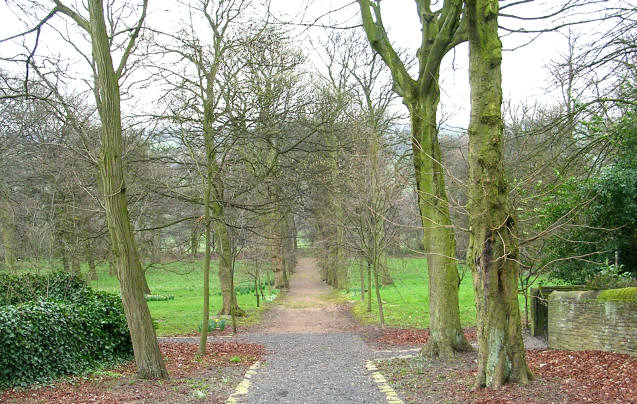
The burial ground at Fulneck

The burial ground or God's Acre stands at the eastern end of the terrace. This also was laid out with elegance and simplicity with the ground, beyond a white triumphal entrance arch, divided into four squares. People were buried in their choir houses rather than together as families. There was one body in each grave. Equality even in death was marked by all occupants having a small and standard gravestone, lying flat on the earth, showing just name and dates. In 1751 the Fulneck elders noted that their "beautiful burial ground was often the reason for deathbed requests for reception" into the Moravian Church. The funeral of a single sister in 1751 involved a procession led by the band of musicians, then the Minister and pastoral labourers, with the Single Sisters’ Labouress dressed entirely in white, the coffin carried by eight single brethren's labourers, the sisters and then finally the brethren. At dawn on Easter Sunday, the congregation would gather in God's Acre to process around the graves with music to celebrate the Resurrection and remember their faithful departed. In 1753, this service attracted a crowd of some 10,000 which proved difficult to manage so the elders chose to cancel the procession in 1754.

=== Schools ===
Boarding schools were opened at Fulneck in 1753 for boys and 1755 for girls. The two schools merged in 1994. A new boys' school building was erected in 1784. A notable student of Fulneck School was the hymn writer James Montgomery (1771–1854), whose father had been converted by the evangelist John Cennick and became a Moravian minister.

=== Theological college ===
On 12 October 1808, a theological seminary was established in the Brethren's House at Fulneck. The principal was Henry Steinhauer and there were five students. Before then, candidates for ordained ministry had to attend schools in Germany for training. Br John Hartley, the Head of the Schools at Fulneck, had made a proposal in 1795 at a provincial conference in Fulneck for the school to provide collegiate studies for future Ministers. However, this was pronounced to be impracticable by Bishop Samuel Liebisch from the Unity Elders’ Conference. Br Liebisch's pessimism seemed justified when the Fulneck seminary had to be closed in 1828. Ordinands then had to go again to Niesky or Gnadenfeld for training. In 1858 the British Provincial Synod decided that a theological college had become essential and so a new one was opened at Fulneck in October 1860. This college was also given the task of training teachers for Moravian Schools. Br John England was appointed as its principal. The college took occupation of the Single Brothers’ House. The Fulneck Seminary was transferred to Fairfield Moravian Settlement in Lancashire in 1875 as a result of a decision by the 1874 Provincial Synod. This was so that the Seminary could benefit from a relationship with Owen's College (later the Victoria University of Manchester).

=== Music ===
Fulneck was like the continental Moravian churches in having bands of musicians in the eighteenth century, e.g. trombone players who would anticipate the trumpet sound of the general resurrection in the Easter dawn services. This is a tradition which has survived in the Moravian Congregations in Germany, the Netherlands and Denmark as well as the United States but not in England.

On 30 March 1912, the first Yorkshire Moravian Choir Festival was held at Fulneck. Around the same time, the Fulneck organist, Br C S Nelson, retired after forty-seven years of service. With his brother and father before him, this family had provided the Settlement with organ music for ninety-two years. In the last decades of the 20th century Harold Jones ARCO, LRAM, also Music Master at Fulneck School, served as organist for an extended period; some of his musical settings are to be found in the Moravian Hymn Book.

The church has a pipe organ by John Snetzler dating from 1748 with work from J J Binns 1930. On the first Thursday of each month (the second Thursday in January) at 11.00 am Fulneck resident Dr Simon Lindley gave a recital on the organ. Dr Lindley also conducted and directed a special weekend of music in Fulneck Church on the weekend before the late August Bank Holiday.

== The Church today ==
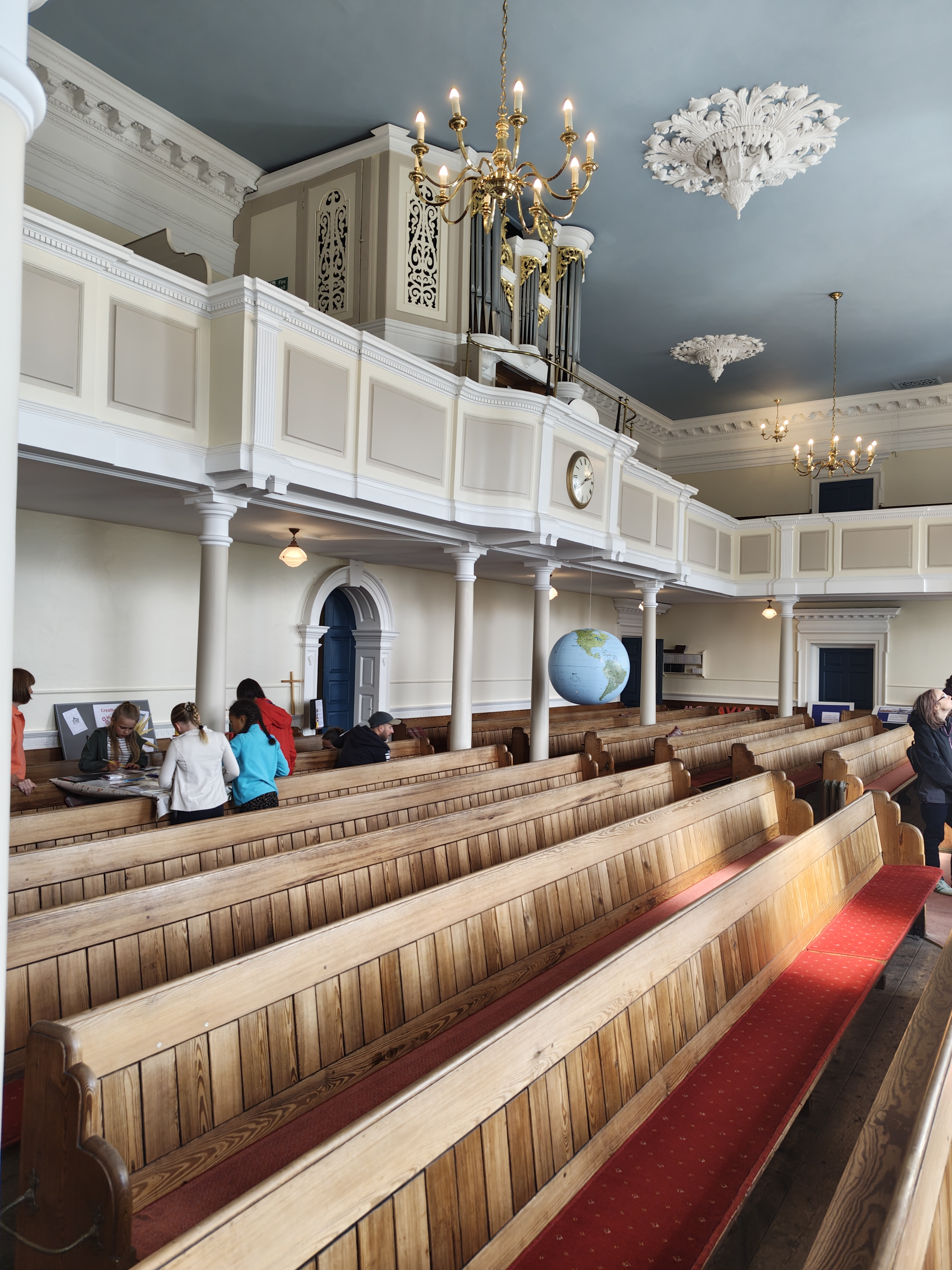
Interior of the church, in 2025

Fulneck Moravian Church is still a busy congregation with activities for all ages and various interests. Family Worship is at 10.30 am every Sunday, and the traditional Lovefeast and Communion service is held on the first Sunday of the month at 2.30 pm (except January and August). Morning Prayers are held every Thursday at 9.45 am.

Fulneck Museum is open on Wednesdays and Saturdays from 2 pm to 4 pm between Easter and the end of October.

== Buildings ==
Fulneck Moravian Church is a Grade I listed building.

More details of external links showing other listed buildings in the settlement can be found on the Fulneck Moravian Settlement page.

== See also ==
- Fulneck Moravian Settlement
- Grade I listed buildings in West Yorkshire
- Listed buildings in Pudsey

== Bibliography ==
- Comenius, John Amos (1661) An Exhortation of the Churches of Bohemia to the Church of England, London, printed for Thomas Parkhurst at the Three Crowns over-against the great Conduit, at the lower end of Cheap-side
- Hamilton, J. T. and Hamilton, K. G. (1967) History of the Moravian Church: the Renewed Unitas Fratrum 1722–1957, Bethlehem, Pa, and Winston-Salem, NC, Interprovincial Board of Christian Education, Moravian Church in America
- McQuillan, T. (1950) Two Hundred Years of Christian Witness: A Brief Account of the Story of the Moravian Church in Dukinfield
- Mellowes, F. H. (1977) A Short History of Fairfield Moravian Church
- Podmore, C. (1998) The Moravian Church in England 1728–1760, Oxford, Clarendon Press
- Rican, R. (transl Crews, C. Daniel) (1992) The History of the Unity of the Brethren: A Protestant Hussite Church in Bohemia and Moravia, Bethlehem Pa, and Winston-Salem, NC, Moravian Church in America
