= Wir wollen alle fröhlich sein =

German Easter hymn

- German Easter hymn
- English: "Rejoice we all this Easter-tide!"
- Text: by Cyriakus Spangenberg (stanzas 2–5)
- Language: German
- Melody: by the Bohemian Brethren
- Composed: 1544
- Published: 1573
- Tune EG 106

"Wir wollen alle fröhlich sein" ("We all want to be merry", freely: "Rejoice we all this Easter-tide!") is a German Easter hymn, with a text mostly by Cyriakus Spangenberg, who added to an older first stanza, and a 1544 tune by the Bohemian Brethren. It was published in Wittenberg in 1573.

== History ==
The first stanza of "Wir wollen alle fröhlich sein" was written in the 14th century in Medingen Abbey, a nuns' monastery. The following four stanzas were added by Cyriakus Spangenberg in Eisleben. The melody appears first in a Bohemian monastery in Hohenfurt, another sources says "Böhmische Brüder 1544" (Bohemian Brethren 1544). It was printed in Wittenberg in 1573. It has appeared in German-language hymnals, including in the Protestant hymnal Evangelisches Gesangbuch as EG 100, and in the Catholic hymnal Gotteslob as GL 326.
