= Elfriede Wojaczek-Steffke =

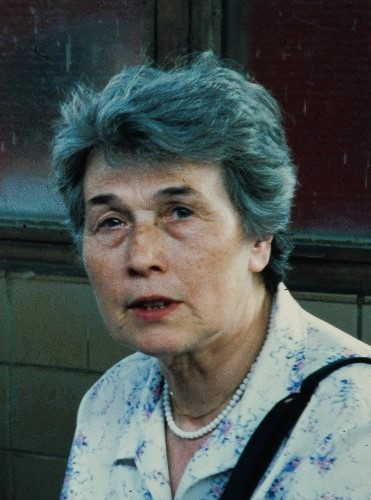
- Born: 24 March 1931; Stachovice, Czechoslovakia
- Died: 18 March 2024 (aged 92); Berlin, Germany

Elfriede Wojaczek-Steffke (* 24 March 1931 in Stachovice, Czech Republic; † 18 March 2024 in Berlin) was a German author of short stories and poems. She later wrote her autobiography with emphasis on her childhood in the Sudetenland and her experiences of the brutal expulsion of its German population, which began in 1945. This was published first in Czech and later German languages. Her published works and outspoken interviews are considered outstanding services to the German-Czech reconciliation.

== Life ==
Elfriede Wojaczek-Steffke grew up in a Catholic family with two siblings in Stachovice, Czechoslovakia (today part of Fulnek, Czech Republic). At the end of 1946, the family was forced to leave its home and was resettled in the then Soviet occupation zone, eventually finding a new home in Hennigsdorf near Berlin. After finishing high school in 1951, Wojaczek-Steffke studied veterinary medicine at the Humboldt University of Berlin (graduating in 1956 and obtaining her doctorate in 1957). She then worked at the Veterinary and Animal Health Office in Dresden from 1957 to 1961. She moved to Berlin in 1962 to marry physicist Karl Wojaczek, where she then worked as a veterinarian until 1972. Later, alongside her family and social commitments, she devoted herself to her writing, joining the Maxim Gorky circle of working-class writers in 1978. She published numerous stories and poems during her time in East Germany, but for political reasons, her autobiography 'Vom geliebten zum gelobten Land' (in English: 'From the Beloved to the Promised Land') remained unpublished until after the fall of the Berlin Wall in 1989. In 1995, the first version was finally published in the Czech language, and was the first publication in the Czech Republic to directly address the ruthless expulsion of the Czech native German population from their homes. The book attracted extensive attention and was hailed a major contribution to German-Czech reconciliation. It was published in the German language in 1996 and 2001.

Elfriede Wojaczek-Steffke and her husband had two children. In her stories and poems, she shares her perspective on life as Catholic mother under the East Germany dictatorship. In October 1989, shortly before the fall of the Berlin wall, at a major demonstration at Berlin's Alexanderplatz, she took the stand to fearlessly denounce the atrocious injustices of the Stasi (the state security service and secret police of East Germany from 1950 to 1990) based on her own personal experiences. After German reunification, she became a member of the Ackerman Community and was actively involved in publishing and lecturing to promote the reconciliation of Czechs and Germans.

Elfriede Wojaczek-Steffke was the daughter of Elfriede Steffke (1907–2000), who also wrote poetry for anthologies, which were published by various publishing houses. Steffen Mensching published an article on Steffke in the literary magazine 'Temperamente' in 1980. Her anthology 'Ich hab mir Sonnenstrahlen aufgespart' (which translates to, 'I saved up sunbeams') was published in 2007. Elfriede Steffke was honoured as the hometown poet of Hennigsdorf.

== Selected works ==
- "Was tut's" in Musik des Lebens, Berlin 1977
- "Leute von heute" in Die Uhr des Baltus Kern, Berlin 1979
- "Poesie eines Unfalls", "Eine Liebesgeschichte", "Der Bummelfritze", "S-Bahn-Episode", "Fräulein Schindler", "Begegnung" in Kirschblüten im Rauch, Leipzig 1984
- "Hart stieß der Engel mich", "Zwischen Halle und Weimar" in Türklinken zum Leben, Leipzig, 1990
- "Kerzen am Rathaus", "Der Büchsenjunge", "Schnee von gestern" in Zwischen Gewalt und Gnade, Katholisches Hausbuch 1992. Leipzig 1991
- Ze země milované, do země zaslíbené (translator: Marie Reslova), Prag 1995
- "Zukunft und Vergangenheit", "Pflanz einen Baum" in Wurzeln, Christliches Hausbuch 2000, Leipzig, 1999
- Vom geliebten zum gelobten Land, Velten 1996, Leipzig St. Benno-Verlag 2001
- "Bockwurst-Aster" in Berliner Geschichten, Berlin 2000
- "Der 17. Juni 1953" in Peter Lange, Sabine Roß (Hg.) 17. Juni 1953 – Zeitzeugen berichten, (S. 67, 90 ff, 383 f), Münster 2004
- "Das Eignungsgespräch", "Großmuttel", "Schnee von gestern", "Sturmgrillen" in Im Kreis, der Leben heißt, Berlin, 2006
- Geschichten und Gedichte aus der Schublade, Norderstedt, 2022

== Honours ==
- 2014: Golden Badge of Honour of the Ackerman Community
- TV Series (in German language), "Meine DDR"
- Buchrezension Alte Heimat (Book Review of the Old Homeland)
- Elfriede W.- Steffke, Zirkel schreibender Arbeiter
- Award of the Golden Badge of Honour of the Ackerman Community
- Erzähl deine Geschichte
- Filmmakers
- Elfriede W.- Steffke in der tschechischen Nationalbibliothek (in Czech language)
- Das Protektorat Böhmens und Mährens in der deutschen Literatur
