= Karolína Huvarová =

Czech fitness trainer, model and singer

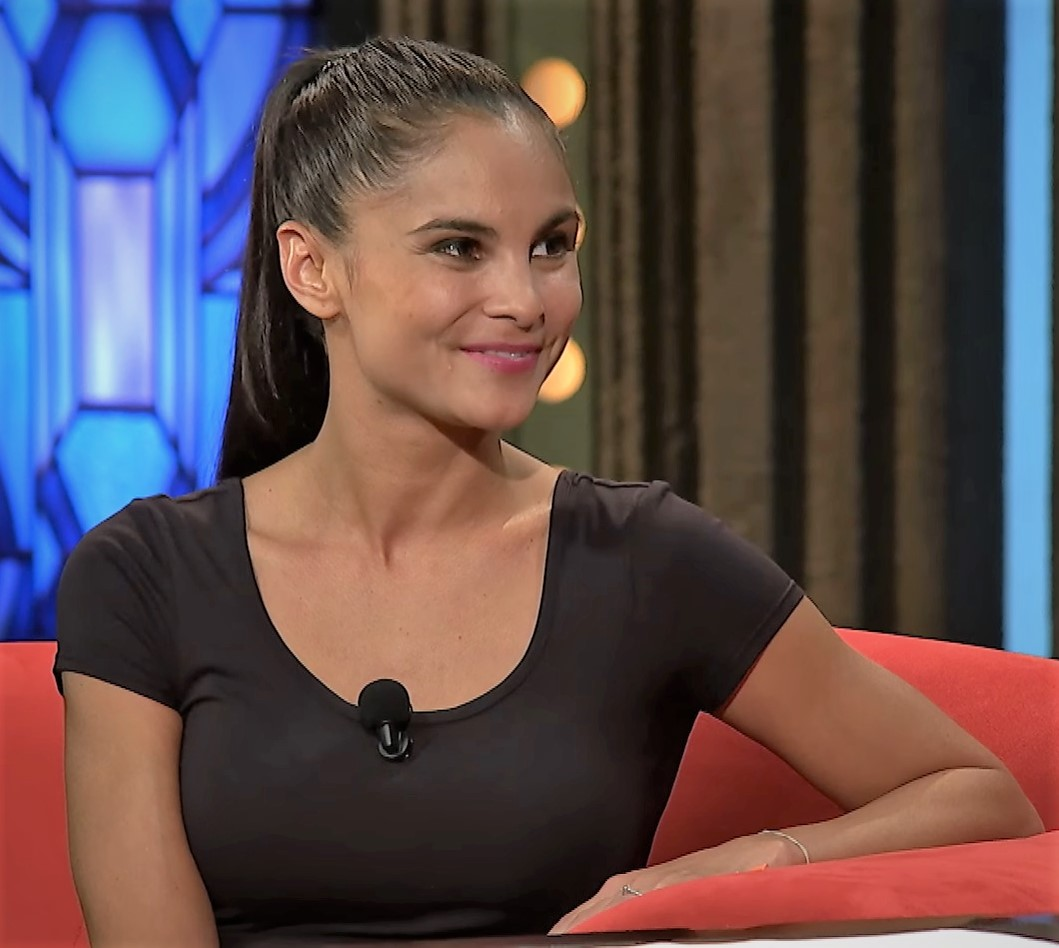
- Huvarová in a promotion for Show Jana Krause in 2020
- Born: 29 April 1986 (age 40); Nový Jičín, Czechoslovakia
- Other name: Karolína Oravski
- Occupations: Fitness trainer, model, singer
- Known for: First European woman to coach a US professional hockey team; Playboy Playmate
- Height: 163 cm (5 ft 4 in)
- Website: bikinifitnessprincess.cz

Karolína Huvarová Oravski (born 29 April 1986) is a Czech fitness trainer, model, Instagram influencer, singer and former fitness competitor. She was the first European woman to coach an American professional men's hockey team, and has been featured in magazines including the Czech edition of Playboy.

== Early life and education ==
Karolína Huvarová was born on 29 April 1986 in Nový Jičín in what was then Czechoslovakia, but soon moved with her family to Fulnek, where she studied at the J. A. Komenského elementary school. After elementary school, she attended grammar school in Vítkov.

From 2006 to 2010, Huvarová attended the University of Ostrava and graduated with master's degrees in Czech language and music education. She also has a certificate in US immigration law from the American University in Washington D.C. in 2020.

== Early career and performing arts ==
Huvarová had a musical education including choral singing, piano, ballet and modern dance, and private vocal instruction. During grammar school she sang at parties and events with local band "Relax". In 2004, Huvarová competed in the first season of the television singing competition Česko hledá SuperStar, and reached the top 40, before being eliminated in the first televised semi-final. She says she loved the competition, but took a break from it for her studies. Her college education was to teach the second level of elementary school, but she never taught.

In 2010, Huvarová returned to singing under the name "Kaya", a common diminutive of Karolína. She recorded several song singles, one of which, "Štěstí" (lit. 'Happiness'), reached the top 10 record charts on radio stations Kiss Morava and Čas Radio. In 2011, Huvarová played a minor role in the film Bastardi 2. The same year, her bikini photo won a beauty contest for TV Nova Czech television channel. In 2019, Huvarová also sang the Czech national anthem Kde domov můj during a hockey team practice after a game with the Carolina Thunderbirds, the team she coached with her then-boyfriend.

Huvarová has also danced professionally, as a backup dancer for Trinidadian-German singer Haddaway, from 2015. In 2017, she danced for Haddaway in the Czech Republic, Denmark, and for Gerry Weber German fashion company.

== Fitness ==
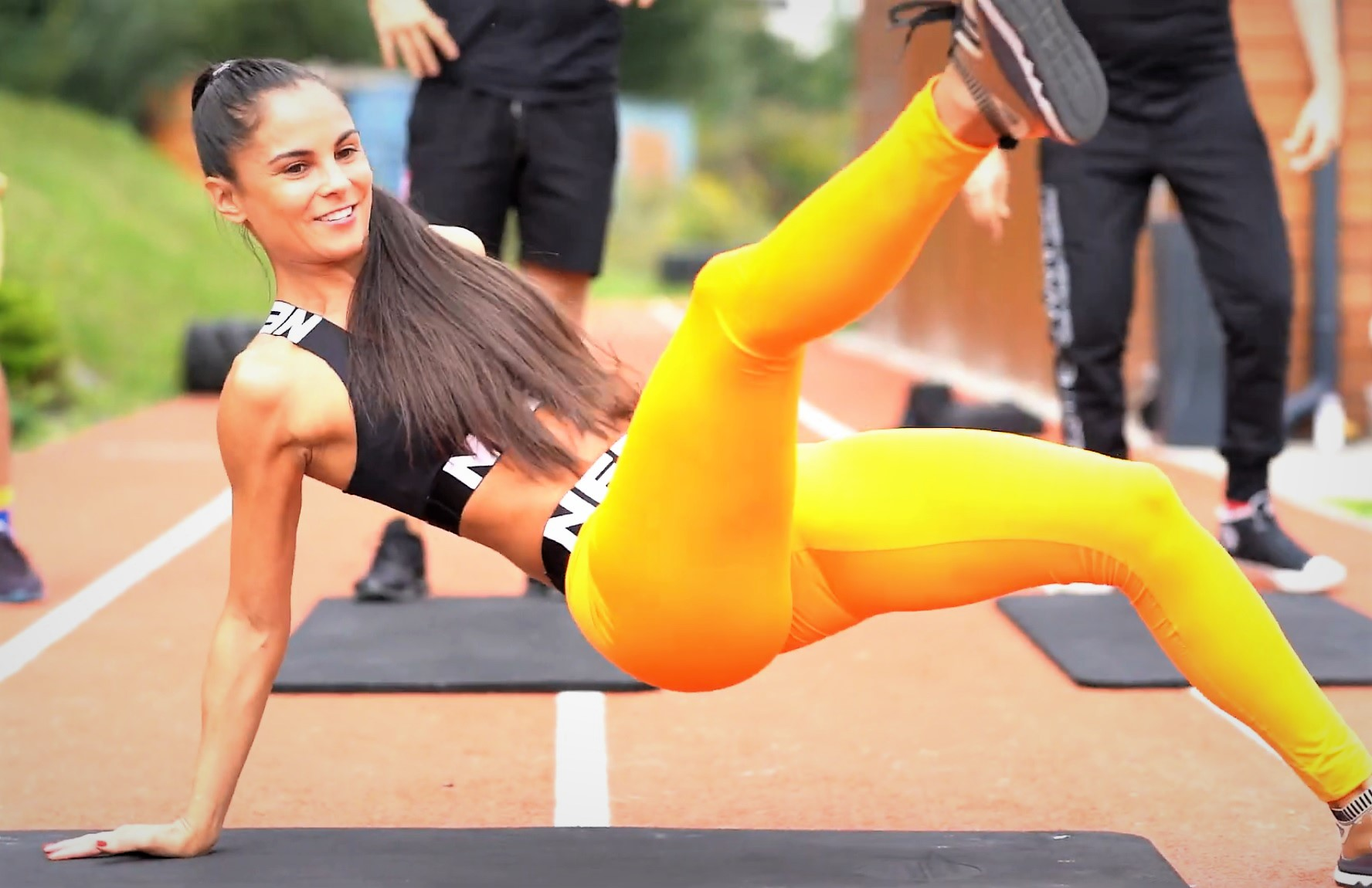
Huvarová demonstrating the exercises she uses for the Thunderbirds to the Nebbia team in 2020

Huvarová obtained a fitness instructor license in 2004 and maintained her own gym in Fulnek from 2004 to 2006. She began fitness and figure competition in 2014. Competing as Karolína Oravski, she won second place in the 2015 bikini fitness championship of Moravia and Silesia up to 164 cm, and tenth place in mixed pairs up to 164 cm. This allowed her to be a Czech Republic representative at the 2015 International Federation of BodyBuilding and Fitness World Championships in Budapest; she did not reach the semifinals.

Throughout 2016, Huvarová had a recurring feature (Zpátky do Formy!, lit. 'Back in Shape!') in the Ostrava region magazine Lečo Ostrava or Magazín Lečo, where she demonstrated exercises.

=== Hockey trainer and coach ===
In 2016, Huvarová traveled to the United States to see her boyfriend, Czech-Austrian ice hockey player and coach Andre Niec. He was hired to coach the Berlin River Drivers professional ice hockey team in New Hampshire, and she became the team trainer in the second season. In 2017, when the Drivers ceased operations, Niec and Huvarová became head coach and team trainer of the Carolina Thunderbirds (FPHL) ice hockey team in Winston-Salem, North Carolina. She would spend over half the year in the United States, during the ice hockey season of October to April, and the summer in the Czech Republic. There, she did fitness training for football players from FC Baník Ostrava and private clients.

On 1 November 2018, Huvarová was named interim head coach of the Thunderbirds after Niec was suspended for six games. This made Huvarová the first European woman to coach an American men's professional hockey team, and the second woman (after Nicole Kirnan who coached the 1000 Islands Privateers in 2013). She joked that she earned the position "in bed". Niec's suspension was reduced to four games on 12 November, and he returned to coaching the Thunderbirds. Huvarová's three victories and one loss made her the female hockey coach in FPHL history with the most team victories against Kirnan's 2-3 record. The Thunderbirds finished the season with 39 wins out of 46 games, including a Federal Prospects Hockey League record of 24 consecutive wins, and were the league champions. As a reward to the players, five of whom were Czech, Huvarová sang the Czech national anthem before one game.

Huvarová won another game as Thunderbirds interim head coach on 27 December 2019, while Niec served another suspension for one game. Niec was suspended for another eight games (for taking part in a bench-clearing brawl) in March 2020, before the season was canceled due to the COVID-19 pandemic. He had to serve those suspensions in the 2021–22 season, but left the team in 2021 to become a European scout for the Florida Panthers.

== Modeling ==
In 2018, Huvarová contacted the Czech edition of Playboy magazine, and offered to write an article about fitness training the American Carolina Thunderbirds hockey team. The article, and her accompanying pictorial, appeared in the June 2018 issue. She also appeared on the cover of the Časopis Fitness magazine October 2018 issue.

By 2020, Huvarová became known as an Instagram fitness celebrity, with over 95,000 followers. Niec filmed many of her videos. In September 2020, Huvarová became a featured model for the Nebbia Fitness European clothing brand. One month later, she was the Czech Playboy Playmate, and cover model for October 2020. Her pictorial was photographed by Alžběta Jungrová. Nebbia organized a release party for the magazine issue, where it was formally christened with champagne by rapper Sharlota. Huvarová was interviewed about the Playboy pictorial on television talk show Show Jana Krause.

== Personal life ==
Huvarová and Andre Niec became engaged over New Year 2020, which she announced over Instagram.
