= Christian Gregor =

Moravian composer and Bishop

Christian Gregor (January 1, 1723 – November 6, 1801) was a Moravian composer and bishop.

Gregor was born to a peasant family living in the Silesian village of Dirsdorf, near Peilau and became a member of the Moravian Church when he was seventeen. He moved to Herrnhut, Germany in 1742, where he soon became organist and director of congregational music. He later served similar roles in Herrnhaag (1748) and Zeist (1749). He was ordained a Deacon in 1756, and was appointed to several administrative posts within the Moravian Church during which time he traveled extensively: Riga (1744) where he met Nicolaus Zinzendorf, North America (1770–1772), and a trip to Old Sarepta, Russia (1774) by way of Estonia, Latvia, and St. Petersburg. He was consecrated a bishop in 1789. A translation into English of his Lebenslauf (autobiography) was completed in the 1960s.

Gregor is credited with the Moravian liturgical development of the late 18th century and the introduction of concerted anthems into worship services. Gregor edited the 1779 hymnal and the 1784 chorale book of the Unitas Fratrum. He composed several hundred musical works of which the majority are preserved in collections of the Moravian archives in Herrnhut, Germany, Christiansfeld, Denmark, and Moravian Music Foundation in the United States, as well as the University of Warsaw.

He died in Berthelsdorf, near Herrnhut, on November 6, 1801.
