= Fulneck Moravian Settlement =

Village in West Yorkshire, England

Coordinates: 53.7837°N 1.6648°W

Fulneck
- Location within West Yorkshire
- OS grid reference: SE225319
- Metropolitan borough: City of Leeds
- Metropolitan county: West Yorkshire
- Region: Yorkshire and the Humber
- Country: England
- Sovereign state: United Kingdom
- Post town: PUDSEY
- Postcode district: LS28
- Dialling code: 0113
- Police: West Yorkshire
- Fire: West Yorkshire
- Ambulance: Yorkshire
- UK Parliament: Leeds West and Pudsey

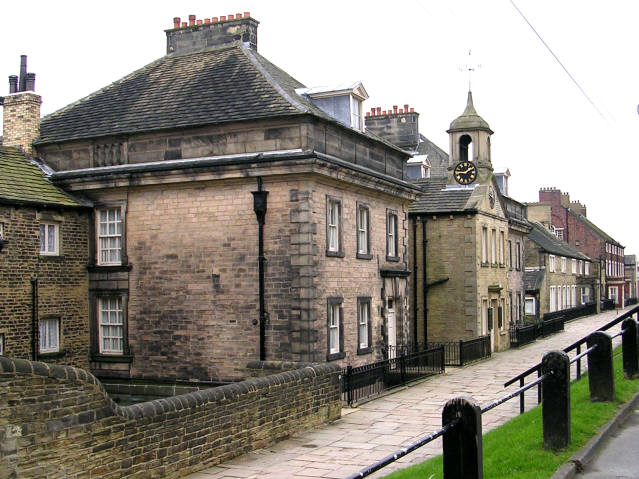
Fulneck Moravian Church

Fulneck Moravian Settlement is a village in Pudsey in the City of Leeds metropolitan borough, West Yorkshire, England. The village (grid reference SE225319) lies on a hillside overlooking a deep valley. Pudsey Beck flows along the bottom of the valley.

== Etymology ==
The name of Fulneck is first attested in 1592, as Fall Neck and the Falle Necke, and is thought to originate in Old English: the name probably comes from the Old English words *fall ('place where something falls, a forest clearing') and hnecca ('neck, neck of land'). If so, it once meant 'a pronounced piece of land characterised by a clearing'.

After members of the Moravian Church bought the land in 1744, the site was renamed Fulneck after Fulnek, a town in Northern Moravia, Czech Republic, where the Moravian denomination originated.

== History ==
Members of the Moravian Church settled at Fulneck in 1744. They were descendants of old Bohemian/Czech Unity of the Brethren, extinct in Bohemia after 1620 due to forcible re-Catholicisation imposed on the Czech lands by Habsburg emperors. These church members had found refuge in 1722 in Saxony on the estate of Nicolaus Ludwig Count von Zinzendorf. Within the next few years of settling at Fulneck, housing, a school and a chapel were built, the last completed in 1748. In 1753 and 1755, separate boys' and girls' schools were opened. They were combined into one school in 1994.

== Amenities ==
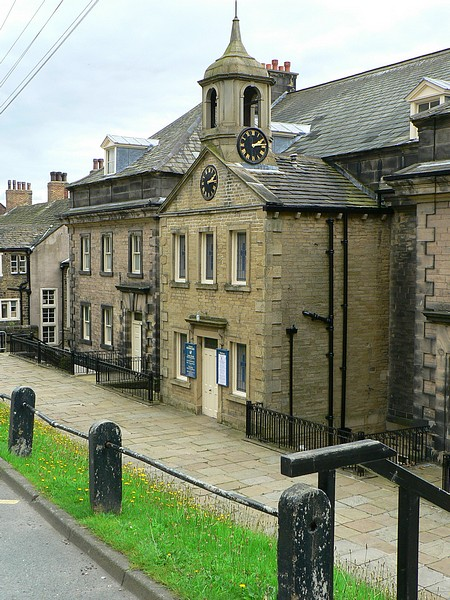
Fulneck Moravian Chapel

Fulneck Moravian Chapel is a Grade I listed building, making it one of the most architecturally significant buildings in Leeds. In addition to the normal Sunday Service(s), there were monthly concerts by Fulneck resident Dr Simon Lindley on a John Snetzler/Binns organ on the first Thursday of every month. This instrument was fully and comprehensively restored in the Autumn and early Winter of 2016 by Wood of Huddersfield. Other regular musical events include recitals by former Fulneck resident cornet virtuoso Phillip McCann and at least two annual visits by Saint Peter's Singers of Leeds for a Baroque music weekend in August and late November/early December for a concert of seasonal music normally including Part One and the Hallelujah Chorus from Handel's oratorio Messiah.

Many of the 18th-century stone houses in the village are listed buildings.

The fee-paying Fulneck School, established in 1753, formed a major part of the Moravian village (Until its closure in 2025)

Founded in 1892, Fulneck Golf Club is the oldest golf club in the Leeds area.

In recent years, a restaurant and cafe occupied an 18th-century listed building, that was the original shop for the settlement. Shop records still survive from its opening in 1762, and are believed to be some of the oldest shop archives in the UK. The premises are now run by Cafe 54 and Antiques and open every day except Saturday.

The Moravian Museum (opposite the church) has operated since 1969 and is open Saturdays and Wednesdays 2 pm-4 pm from April to September.

There are a number of footpaths and scenic walks in the area, including a footpath between Fulneck and the nearby village of Tong and the Leeds Country Way.

== Notable people ==
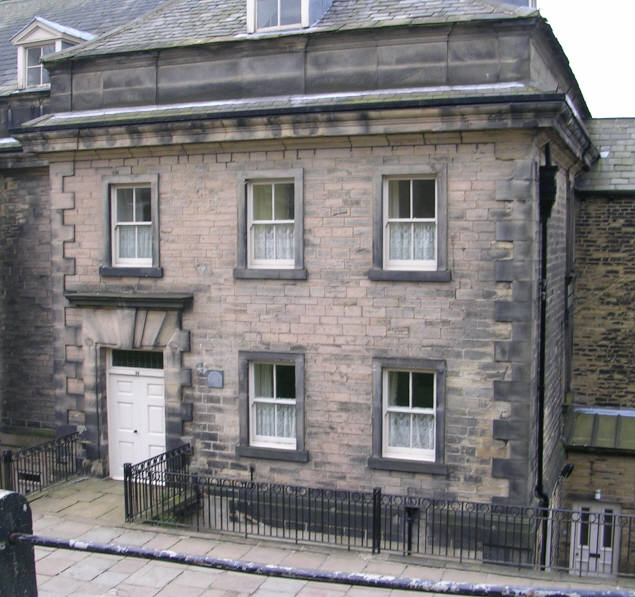
No.34 Fulneck, home of Benjamin Latrobe

- Architect Benjamin Latrobe, whose most famous works include the United States Capitol and the White House porticoes in Washington, D.C., USA
- Cricketer Sir Leonard Hutton, who played for Yorkshire and England. Hutton still holds the record for the highest innings (364) by an Englishman in a test match. A blue plaque marks his former home.
- The Reverend Alexander Cossart Hassé, Bishop in the Moravian Church in the 19th century

== See also ==
- Fulneck Moravian Church
- The Industrial Revolution
