= Cyriacus Spangenberg =

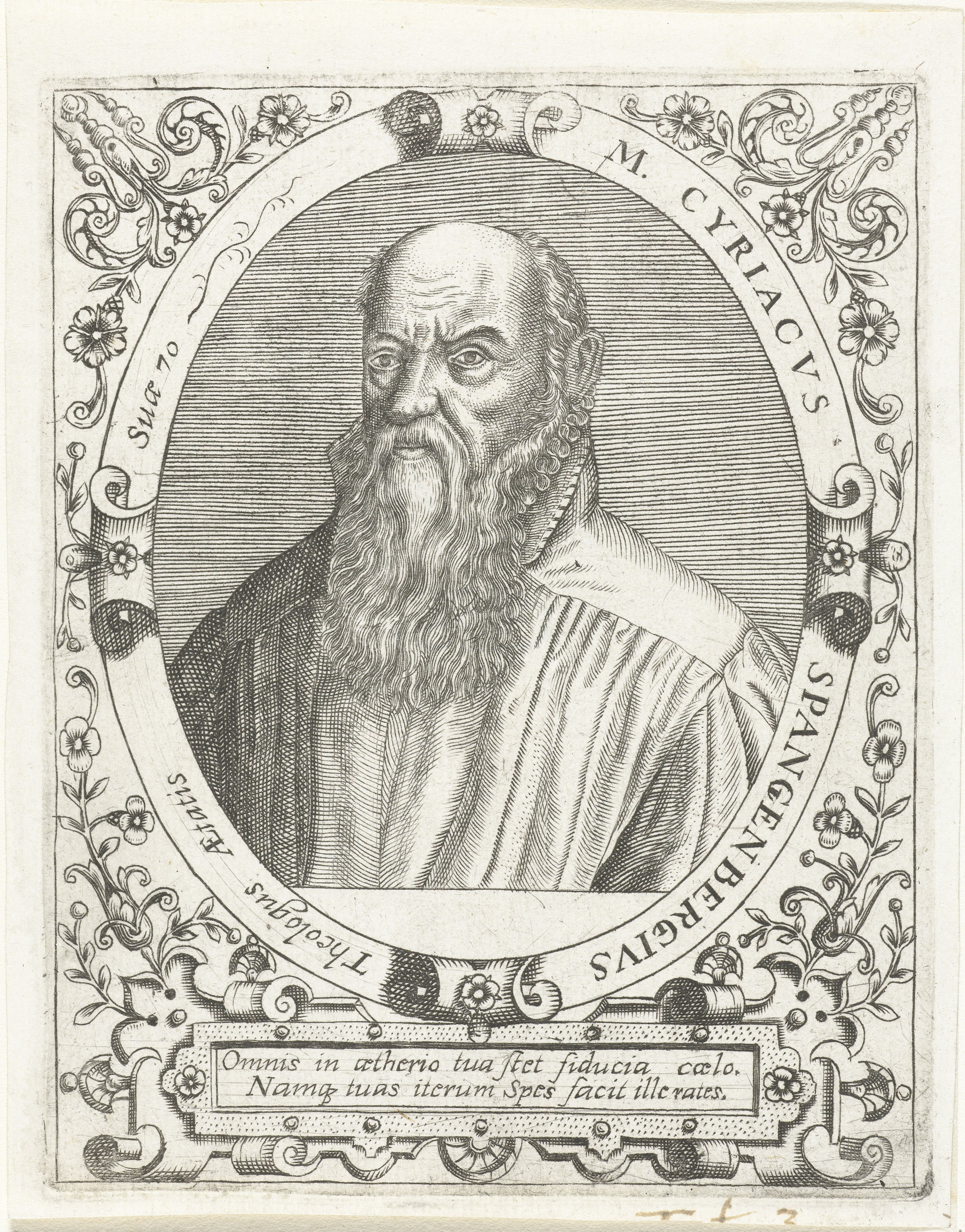
Cyriacus Spangenberg

Cyriacus Spangenberg (7 June 1528 – 10 February 1604) was a German theologian, Protestant reformer and historian, son of the reformer Johannes Spangenberg (1484–1550).

Cyriacus was born in Nordhausen. As a student, he was a fellow tenant of Martin Luther in Wittenberg, later became a minister in Eisleben, and, in 1559, the General Dean of the Grafschaft Mansfeld. In January 1575, he lost his place at Mansfeld because in the Flacian controversy he sided with Matthias Flacius. Along with Flacius, he taught that through original sin some of the substantial faculties of men were also corrupted. This contradicted the doctrine of his opponents that only accidental faculties were depraved. He served as a pastor at Schlitz, Hesse from 1580 until getting expelled in 1590. After getting expelled, he went on a short retreat to Vacha before moving to Strassburg, where his youngest son, Wolfhart Spangenberg, a poet, lived, and where he died. Among the last pupils of Luther, Spangenberg is the most prominent.

He wrote about 150 works. As a historian he wrote Mansfeldi Chronica, Saxonian Chronica, and other publications. His Adelsspiegel is probably the most important early-modern aristocracy treatise. Also he wrote How Husbands Ought to Behave and What every Christian should make...Confession of Faith.
