= John Snetzler =

Swiss organ builder (1710–1785)

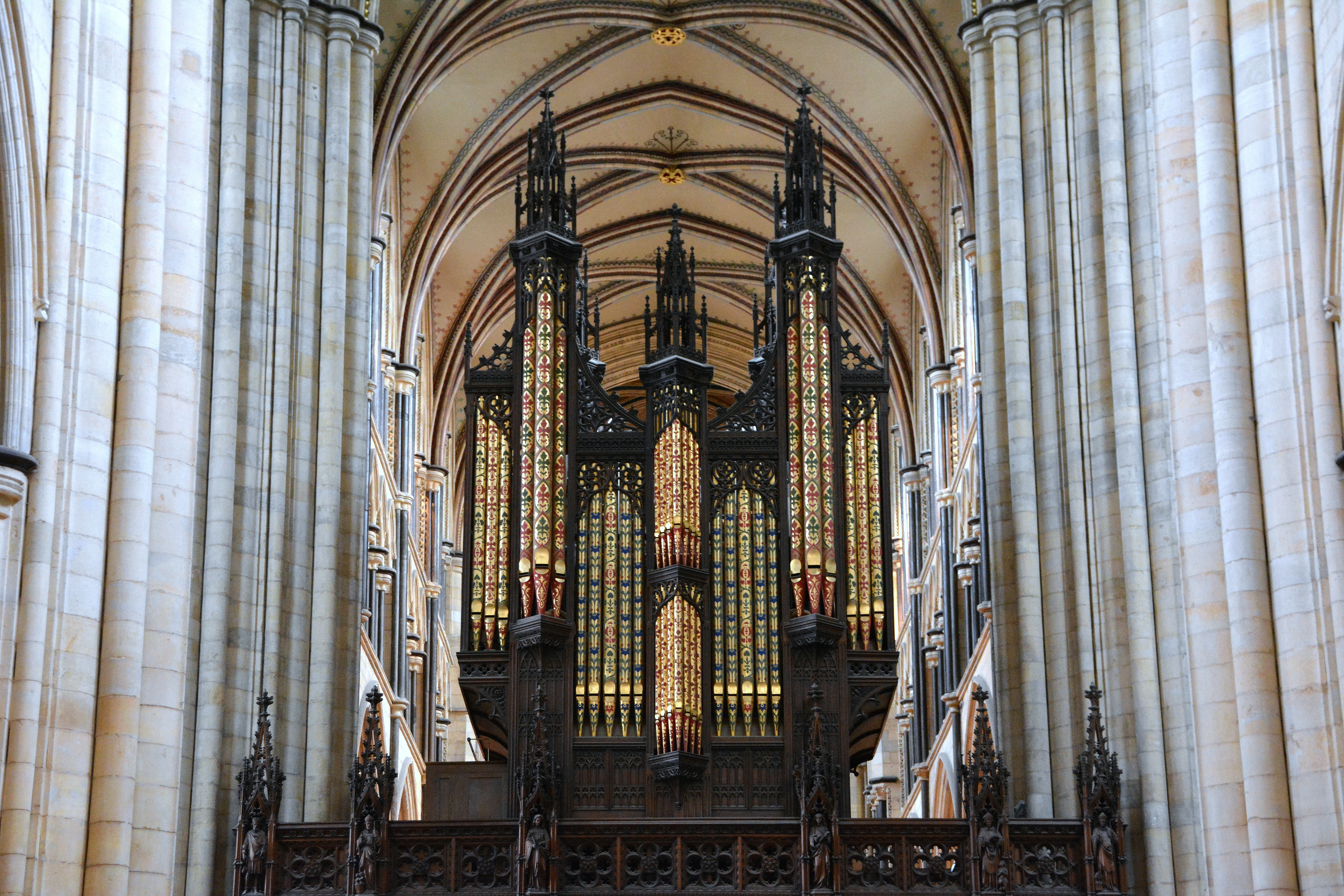
The Snetzler organ case from 1769 in Beverley Minster

John Snetzler (or Schnetzler) was an organ builder of Swiss origin, who set up his workshop in London, and worked extensively throughout the United Kingdom. Born in Schaffhausen in 1710, he trained with the firm of Egedacher in Passau and came to London about 1741. When he retired in 1781, his business continued and ended up with Thomas Elliot. Snetzler died in Schaffhausen on 28 September 1785.

== List of works ==
- Belle Skinner Collection, Yale University, New Haven, Connecticut, 1742 (restored 1983 by Noel Mander)
- St Saviour's Chapel, Cathedral of the Holy and Undivided Trinity, Norwich, Norfolk 1745
- St Andrew's Qualified Chapel, Carrubbers' Close, Edinburgh 1747, now in University of Glasgow Concert Hall
- Fulneck Moravian Church, Leeds 1748
- St Margaret's, King's Lynn 1754
- Chamber organ Clare College, Cambridge 1755 acquired from John Bibby of Winchester in 1985 and restored in 2016. It had been in the Mission Church of St James, Heysham, and before that in the collection of a 19th-century musicologist, J Fuller Maitland, of Borwick Hall, Lancashire. At one time it was in Shaw House, Berkshire.
- St Paul's Church, Sheffield 1755
- St Nicholas's Church, Whitehaven 1755 – removed to Arlecdon Church in 1904, where it survives in a heavily altered state.
- St Leonard's Church, Swithland, Leicestershire, 1756
- Church of St Mary and All Saints, Chesterfield 1756 (destroyed by fire 1961)
- Duke of Bedford's musical gallery 1756, now St Mary the Virgin, Hillington, Norfolk
- Holy Trinity Church, Hull (now Hull Minster) 1756 and 1758
- Chapel of St John, St John Street, Edinburgh, 1757; the organ purchased by Lodge Canongate Kilwinning No2, is featured in a picture of Burns being made Poet Laureate of the lodge. It is still in regular, hand-pumped use.
- Buckingham Palace 1760, now Eton College Chapel
- Buckingham Palace 1760, now Chapel Royal, St James's Palace
- Unitarian Church, Hastings, 1760 (restored 2010 by Matthew Copley) BA
- Chamber organ for Samuel Bard of Philadelphia and New York 1761, acquired by the National Museum of American History, Washington, D.C. 1969
- The New Room, Bristol 1761 (installed around 1930, previously elsewhere)
- Church of St Andrew, Blickling, Norfolk 1762
- Congregational Church of South Dennis, Massachusetts, United States, built in 1762, installed in 1854
- Concert Hall (Boston, Massachusetts), 1763–1774
- St Laurence Church, Ludlow, Shropshire, 1764
- Peterhouse, Cambridge 1765
- St Patrick's Cathedral, Armagh (Church of Ireland) 1765 (sold in 1838 to the Armagh Music Society in the Tontine, 1849 transferred to Donegall Square Methodist Chapel, Belfast and destroyed on the opening night by fire.)
- Halifax Parish Church 1766 (William Herschel first organist)
- Octagon Chapel, Bath 1767 (William Herschel first organist)
- St Michael's Episcopal Church, Charleston, South Carolina, USA 1768 (Case only; new organ 1994 by Kenneth Jones of Bray, Ireland)
- Beverley Minster 1769
- St Modwen's, Burton upon Trent 1771
- St Malachy's Parish Church, Hillsborough, County Down 1772–1773
- St Martin's Church, Leicester 1774 (Modified 1873 and 1930, some pipework remains)
- National Museum Cardiff 1774, given by Watkin Williams-Wynn
- St Mary's Church, Andover, Hampshire 1775 moved to Wesley Methodist Church, Newquay, Cornwall 1937 (now destroyed)
- St Mary's Church, Nottingham 1777 (some pipework survives in St Andrew's Church, Nottingham)
- Rotherham Minster 1777
- St Anne's Parish Church, Belfast 1781
- St Mary and All Saints Church, Sculthorpe, Norfolk
- Picton Castle, chamber organ in the Great Hall, 1745/46

== Sources ==
- National Pipe Organ Register (NPOR) at the British Institute of Organ Studies
- The Organ, William Leslie Sumner
