= Fulneck School =

Independent school in Pudsey, West Yorkshire, England

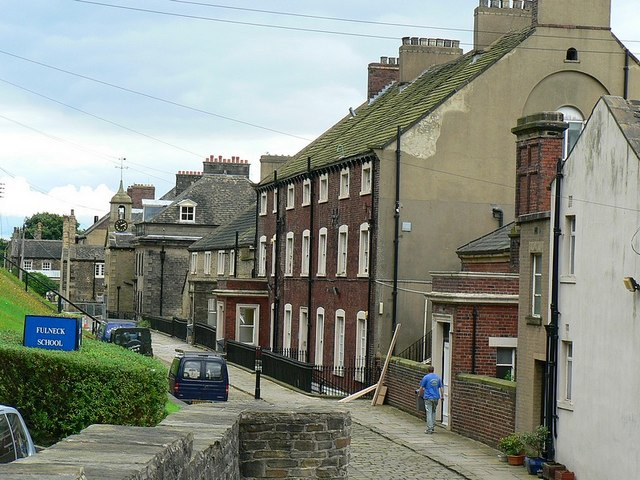

Location
- Fulneck; Pudsey, West Yorkshire, LS28 8DS; England; 53.78404°N 1.66311°W

Information
- Type: Independent school non-selective
- Motto: Work hard, Be kind
- Religious affiliation: Moravian Church
- Established: 1753
- Closed: 2025
- Local authority: City of Leeds
- Department for Education URN: 108117 Tables
- Chair of Governors: E. Dawson
- School Principal: D. P. Cassidy
- Gender: Coeducational
- Age: 3 to 18
- Enrolment: 266
- Houses: Connor & Latrobe (Junior), Wolstenholme, Oastler & Asquith (Senior)
- Colour: Blue
- Publication: The Fulneck Times, The Comenian, The Orgreave
- Website: http://www.moravian.org.uk/

Fulneck School was an independent day and boarding school, situated in the Fulneck Moravian Settlement, in Pudsey, West Yorkshire, England. For 272 years, it provided education for pupils between the ages of 3 and 18. It closed on 8 July 2025. The School buildings are part of the Fulneck Moravian settlement, which includes the Church, Museum, multiple resident buildings and shops and is named after Fulnek, Czechia.

In 2025, it was announced that Fulneck would close after the 2024-2025 School Year.

== History ==
The History of the Fulneck Settlement can be traced back to the Proto Protestant reformer Jan Huss. His teachings that the Bible should be translated into the vernacular tongue (In this case, Czech), his opposition to Simony (which was widespread at the time) and the existence of Purgatory led to his being excommunicated, deemed a heretic and burnt at the stake in 1415. The resulting Hussite wars would see the Hussites crushed and Catholicism re-established as the dominant Religion in Bohemia. The Hussites of the 15th century would evolve into what is now the Moravian Church.

In the 18th century, Moravian Nicolaus Zinzendorf (Count Zinzendorf) attempted to spread the Moravian Church outside of Bohemia and his native Saxony. The Church bought the land that would become Fulneck in 1744, but the Fulneck Moravian Church would not be established until 1749 and the School 4 years later in 1753. It was progressive for the time as it educated both boys and girls. The influx of Moravians was not welcomed locally, and many Moravians feared for their safety in case of a possible pogrom. The Moravians built many underground tunnels leading outside the site in case they needed to escape in an emergency. These tunnels, although not in use, can still be seen today.

In the late 19th century, the office of Headmaster was abolished and the school was made into separate Boys' and Girls' Schools with separate Head Teachers. In 1994, the 2 schools were reunited after the former suffered financial difficulties. The Head Teacher of the Girls' school became Principal of the whole school.

In 2008, the school reopened a building and renamed it the Robinson Building (it used to be the science block for the boys' school), which come to serve as a learning centre for maths, geography, art and food technology. In 2014, the school extensively refurbished Joan Mort House, the building that came to house the Sixth Form Centre.

When Fulneck first opened, the pupils would sleep at the top of the church. The school developed boarding facilities, which were located on the upper floors of the main school building.

Fulneck School had a Learning Support Unit and was registered as a "DU" category school by CReSTeD (Council for the Registration of Schools Teaching Dyslexic Pupils), which meant it had a designated unit for the teaching of pupils with dyslexia on a one-to-one or small-group basis. Fulneck was one of only a few mainstream schools in the North of England to be registered "DU".

Fulneck was a non-selective school. In its later years, the majority of students in the Sixth Form went on to study at university, while some entered apprenticeships and employment. Some students took part in a Multiflight training scheme at Leeds Bradford Airport, and a limited number went on to pilot training at Oxford Aviation Academy.

== Contemporary history ==
In 2019, the school changed the names of their houses from Griffin, Pegasus, and Phoenix to Asquith, Wolstenholme and Oastler, respectively.

In 2020, Fulneck won the 2020 History Bee and Bowl of Northern England (despite having a team of 2).

The school is proud of its history, and in its "East Hall" there are displays of former Captains of the School and past Principals (dating back to 1753).

The school announced on 24 March 2025 that it would close in July 2025, citing a decline in student numbers and rising operating costs as reasons for the closure.

== Notable former pupils ==
- H. H. Asquith (1852–1928), politician, Prime Minister of the United Kingdom 1908–16
- Major Booth (1886–1916), Yorkshire and England cricketer
- Benjamin Henry Latrobe (1764–1820), architect
- James Montgomery (1771–1854), hymnist, poet and editor
- Victor Quelch (1891–1975), Canadian politician
- Dame Diana Rigg (1938–2020), actress appearing in The Avengers
- Sir Robert Robinson (1886–1975), Nobel laureate in chemistry
- Frederic Shoberl (1775–1853), Writer
- Elizabeth Clarke Wolstenholme Elmy (1833–1918) suffragist, life-long campaigner and organiser
