= Fulnek =

- Town
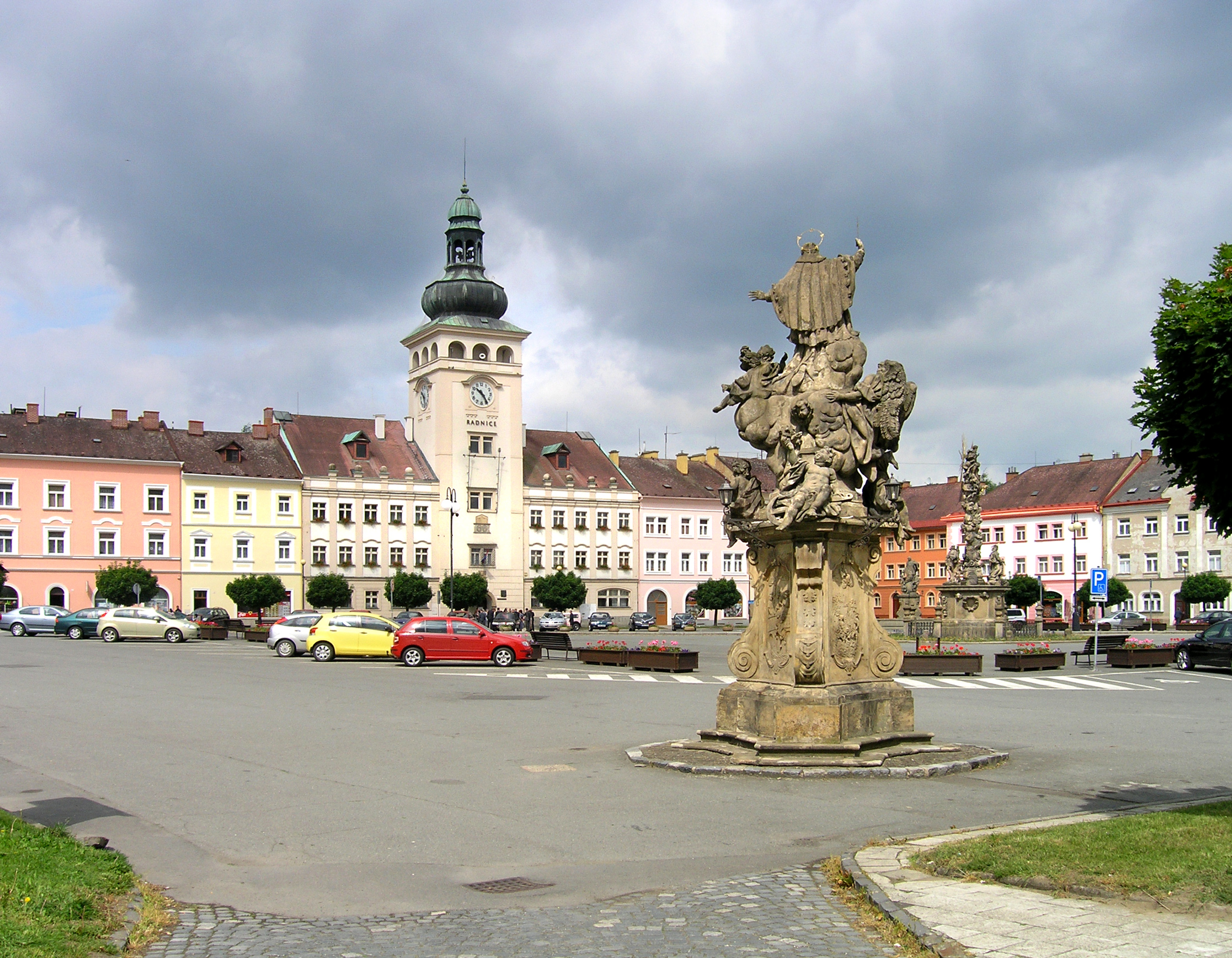
- Town square with the town hall

- Flag Coat of arms

- Location in the Czech Republic
- Coordinates: 49°42′45″N 17°54′12″E
- Country: Czech Republic
- Region: Moravian-Silesian
- District: Nový Jičín
- First mentioned: 1293

Government
  - Mayor: Radka Krištofová

Area
  - Total: 68.49 km^{2} (26.44 sq mi)
- Elevation: 258 m (846 ft)

Population (2026-01-01)
  - Total: 5,436
  - Density: 79.37/km^{2} (205.6/sq mi)
- Time zone: UTC+1 (CET)
  - Summer (DST): UTC+2 (CEST)
- Postal code: 742 45
- Website: www.fulnek.cz

Fulnek (Czech pronunciation: [ˈfulnɛk]) is a town in Nový Jičín District in the Moravian-Silesian Region of the Czech Republic. It has about 5,400 inhabitants. It is located in the Nízký Jeseník range.

In the 16th century, Fulnek became a centre of the Moravian Church. The historic town centre is well preserved and is protected as an urban monument zone. The main landmark of Fulnek is the Church of the Holy Trinity, which is among the most valuable Baroque buildings of the region.

== Administrative division ==
Fulnek consists of 11 municipal parts (in brackets population according to the 2021 census):

- Fulnek (2,801)
- Děrné (363)
- Dolejší Kunčice (124)
- Jerlochovice (593)
- Jestřabí (136)
- Jílovec (68)
- Kostelec (98)
- Lukavec (372)
- Pohořílky (54)
- Stachovice (445)
- Vlkovice (302)

== Etymology ==
The origin of the name is uncertain. It could be derived from the German words Pfuhl ('swamp') or faul ('putrid') according to its location near slow-flowing watercourse. In the oldest documents, the name appeared as Vulneck.

== Geography ==
Fulnek is located about 14 kilometres (9 mi) north of Nový Jičín and 25 km (16 mi) southwest of Ostrava. It lies in the hilly landscape of the Nízký Jeseník range. The highest point is at 555 m (1,821 ft) above sea level. The town is situated at the confluence of the streams of Husí potok and Gručovka.

== History ==
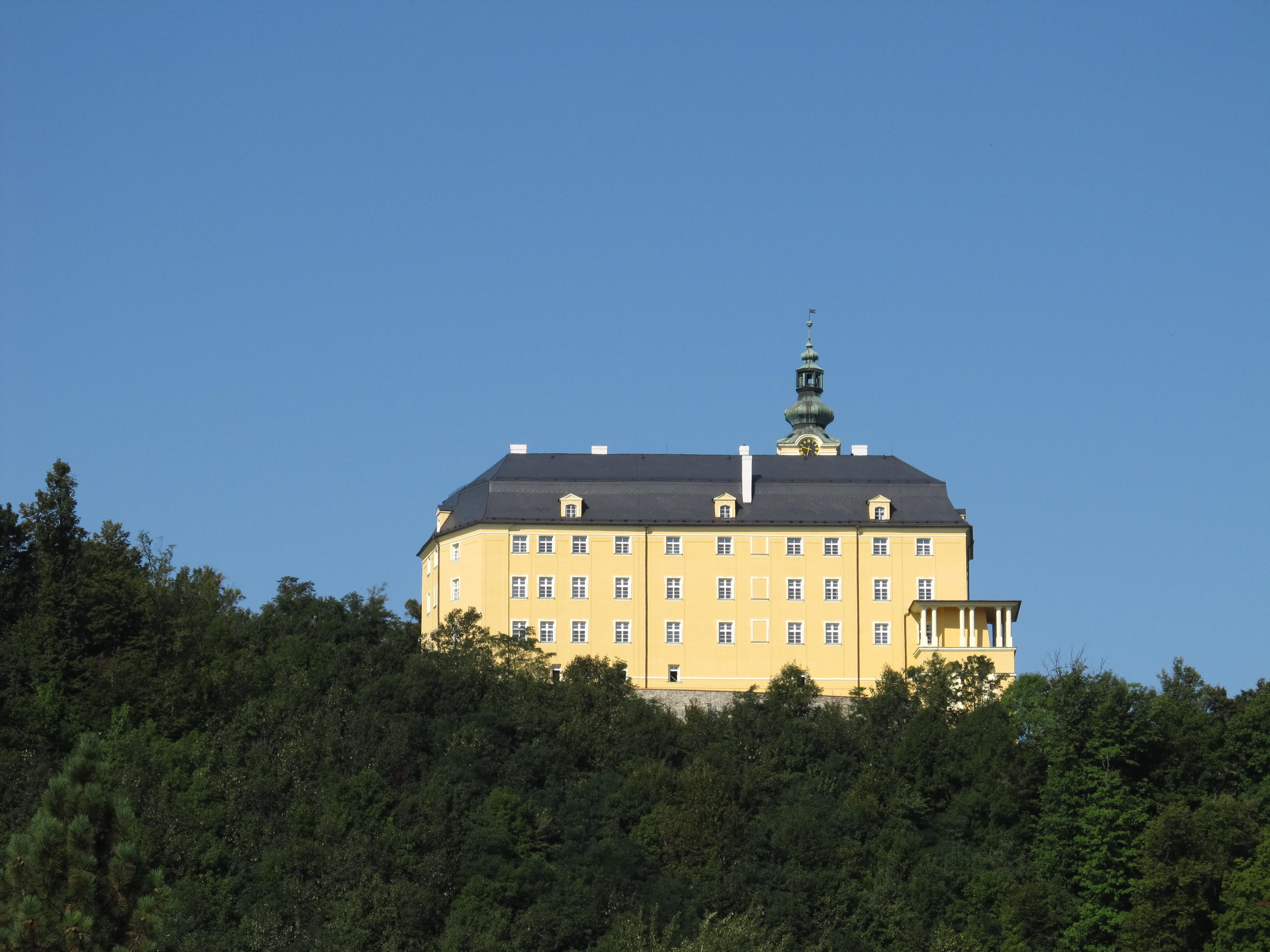
The castle Horní zámek

Fulnek was probably founded by the lords of Lichtenburk, who received this land from King Ottokar II. The first written mention of Fulnek is from 1293, when the town already had a fortress, a church and a rectory. The town was probably planned as the centre of a larger estate, which is indicated by the relatively large town square. Fulnek was inhabited by German population, during the Hussite Wars became partly Czech.

In the 16th century, Fulnek was a prosperous Renaissance town with German majority. It became an important centre of Moravian Church. A very important representative of this church was John Amos Comenius, who lived and worked here in 1618–1621.

In the first half of the 17th century, when Fulnek was owned by the Bruntálský of Vrbno family, there was a lively construction activity in the early Baroque style, which significantly enriched the town and gave it a new character. At the end of the 18th and the beginning of the 19th century, Fulnek developed rapidly thanks to cloth and weaving production.

In the second half of the 1920s, ethnic differences in the town subsided. In 1938, Fulnek was occupied by Nazi Germany and administered as part of the Reichsgau Sudetenland. Until the spring of 1945, it became the main control centre for Germanisation resettlement operations throughout the border, which was occupied by Germany. The great fire at the end of the war severely damaged the historic centre, but did not damage the town's landmarks. The German-speaking population was expelled in 1945 according to the Beneš decrees and replaced by Czech settlers.

== Demographics ==
Historical population

Year	Pop.	±%
1869	7,628	—
1880	7,814	+2.4%
1890	7,430	−4.9%
1900	7,538	+1.5%
1910	7,713	+2.3%

Year	Pop.	±%
1921	6,818	−11.6%
1930	7,458	+9.4%
1950	4,682	−37.2%
1961	5,823	+24.4%
1970	5,945	+2.1%

Year	Pop.	±%
1980	6,455	+8.6%
1991	6,225	−3.6%
2001	6,053	−2.8%
2011	5,720	−5.5%
2021	5,356	−6.4%

Source: Censuses

== Transport ==
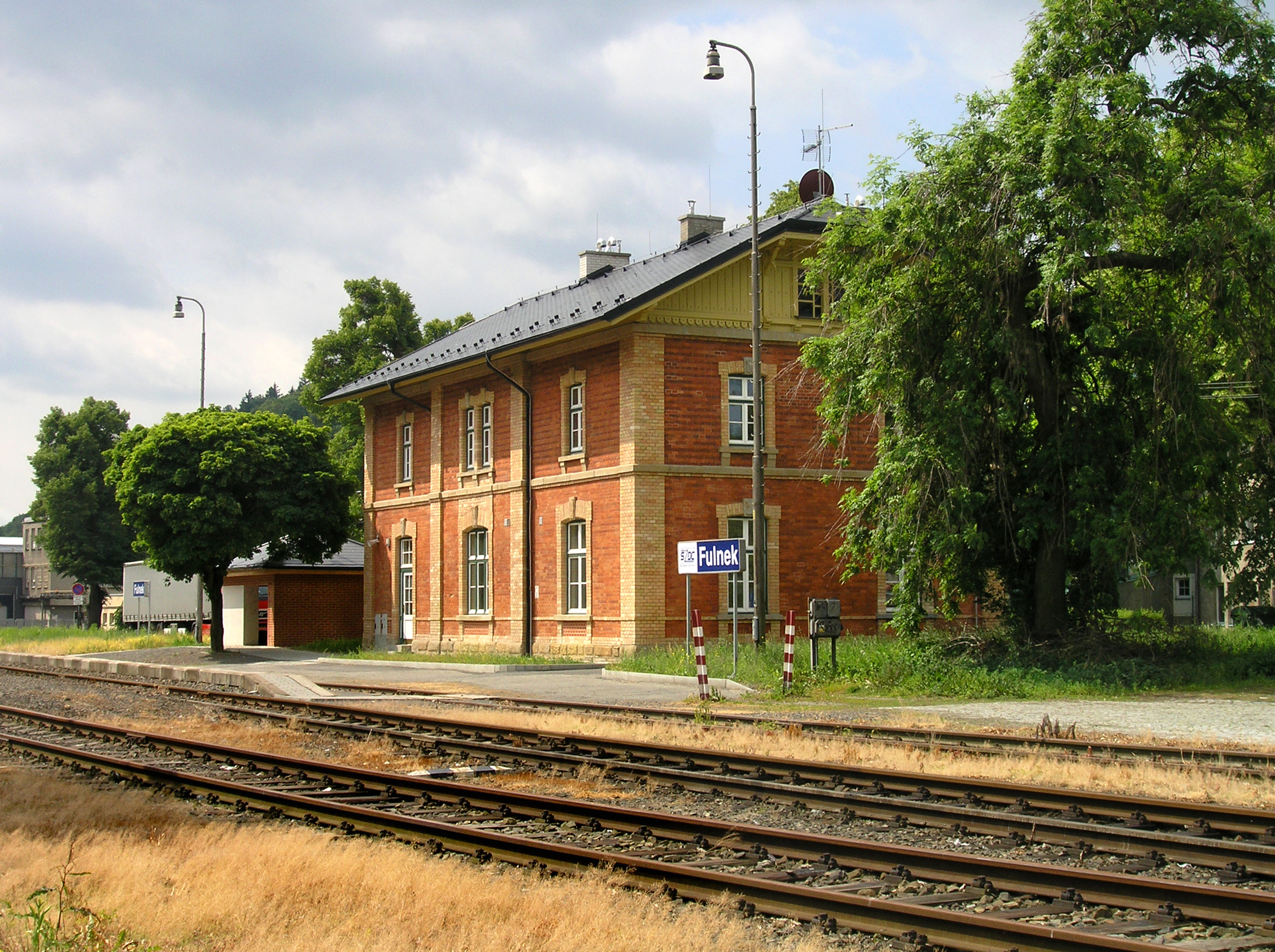
Train station

Fulnek is located on a short railway line of local importance heading from Fulnek to Suchdol nad Odrou.

== Sport ==
The local football club Fotbal Fulnek plays in lower amateur tiers.

== Sights ==
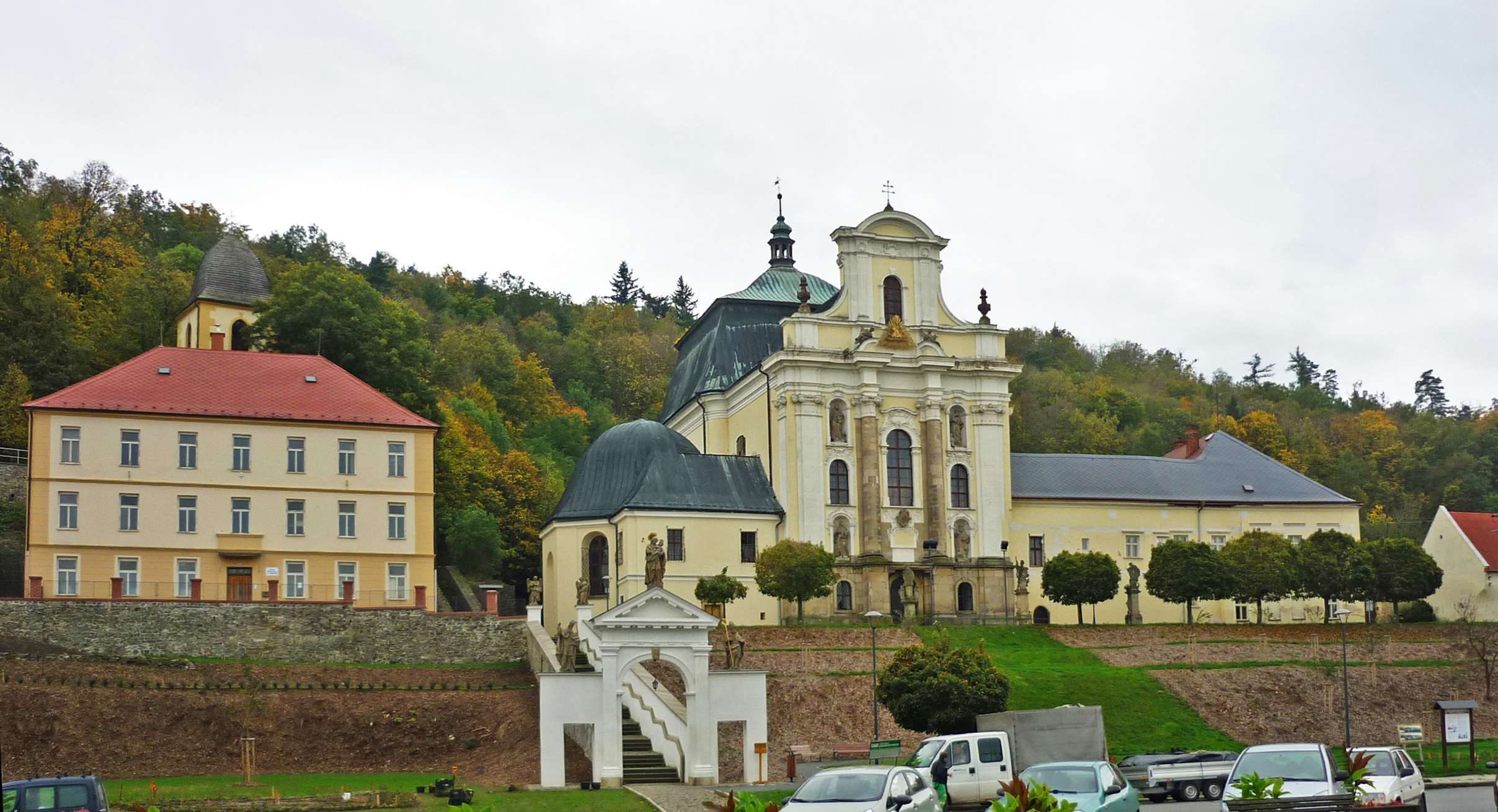
Church of the Holy Trinity

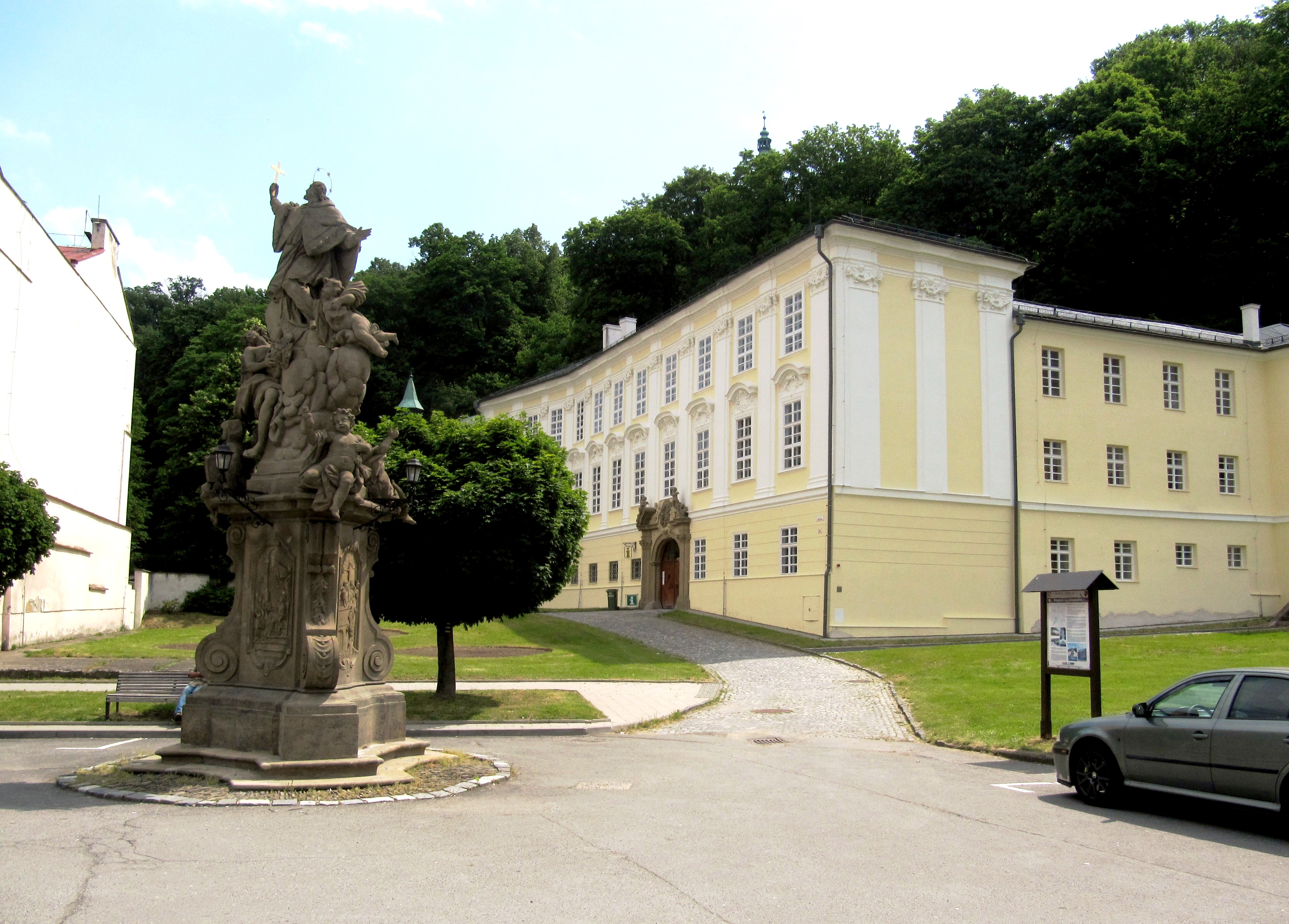
Knurr's Palace

The Church of the Holy Trinity was built in 1750–1760 and is one of the most important Baroque monuments in the region. Originally, it was part of the Augustinian monastery, from which the Gothic cloister has been preserved (today part of the rectory).

The complex of the Fulnek Castle is formed by two buildings called Dolní zámek ('lower castle') and Horní zámek ('upper castle'). The old Gothic castle, first documented in 1372, was rebuilt into a Renaissance residence in the 1560s–1570s and now is called Horní zámek. In 1628–1633, the third floor was added and a tower was built. In 1653–1655, the fortification was modernized and the castle was modified in the Baroque style. Another building, now called Dolní zámek, was built along the medieval fortification in the mid-18th century and then adapted to the flats and offices of lords' officials. Today the castle complex is privately owned and inaccessible to the public.

A Capuchin monastery was founded here in 1668. The complex of Baroque buildings dates from the 1670s, the Church of Saint Joseph was built in 1674–1683. The monastery was abolished in 1950 and the complex fell into disrepair. The church was reconstructed in 2006 and is used for cultural and social purposes.

Knurr's Palace dates from the early 18th century. It was built for the local burgher E. Knurr. Today it houses the Memorial of J. A. Comenius with an exposition on his life in Fulnek, and a library.

== Notable people ==
- John Amos Comenius (1592–1670), philosopher and pedagogue; lived and worked here in 1618–1621
- Johann Joseph Thalherr (1730–1807), Austrian architect
- Johann Leopold Hay (1735–1794), Bishop of Hradec Králové
- Leopold Ritter von Dittel (1815–1898), Austrian urologist
- August Gödrich (1859–1942), German racing cyclist
- Franz Konwitschny (1901–1962), German conductor and violist
- Elfriede Wojaczek-Steffke (1931–2024), German writer
- Karolína Huvarová (born 1986), fitness trainer and model; lives here
- Petra Kvitová (born 1990), tennis player; raised here

== Twin towns – sister cities ==
Fulnek is twinned with:

- Châtel-sur-Moselle, France
- Łaziska Górne, Poland
- Ljutomer, Slovenia
- Sučany, Slovakia
- Téglás, Hungary
- Vrútky, Slovakia

== See also ==
- Fulneck Moravian Settlement and Fulneck Moravian Church, Yorkshire, England
