= Old Sarepta =

District of Volgograd, Russia

Coordinates: 48°31′10″N 44°30′39″E

Old Sarepta (Russian: Старая Сарепта), now Krasnoarmeyskiy Rayon, is a district of Volgograd, in Russia.

Sarepta was founded 28 kilometers south of Tsaritsyn by the Moravian Brethren in 1765 when Catherine II sought to attract German settlers (so-called Volga Germans) to expand crop production in southern Russia and defend against the invasions of Kalmyk, Kazakh, and Tatar tribes. Its name comes from Sarepta in I Kings 17:9-10 and here derives from that of the Sarpa river, which flows into the Volga nearby.

The city was renamed Krasnoarmeysk in 1920, and became a district of Volgograd (then Stalingrad) in 1931.

A set of eighteenth-century buildings in Sarepta that escaped the bombing during the Battle of Stalingrad is since 1990 an open-air museum called the Old Sarepta Museum of History and Ethnography.

When the German Lutheran church tried to bring Old Serepta under its influence, some of the Moravian Brethren emigrated to Canada and founded New Sarepta.
