= Unity of the Brethren =

Unity of the Brethren (Latin Unitas Fratrum) may refer to:

- Unity of the Brethren (Czech Republic), the province of the Moravian Church in the Czech Republic
- Unity of the Brethren (Texas), a denomination formed in 1903 by Czech Moravians who migrated in the 1800s
- Unity of the Brethren Baptists, a Baptist denomination in the Czech Republic
- Minor Party (Unity of the Brethren), a Christian group in Bohemia that split from the Unity of the Brethren during the 1490s
- Moravian Church or Unitas Fratrum, a Protestant denomination dating to the Bohemian Reformation of the 15th century

== See also ==
- History of the Moravian Church, the Moravian Church's origin in the early fourteenth century to the beginning of mission work in 1732
- Bohemian Reformation, a Christian movement in the late medieval and early modern Bohemia for reform of the Roman Catholic Church
