= Edict of toleration =

Declaration by a ruling power that members of a given religion will not be persecuted

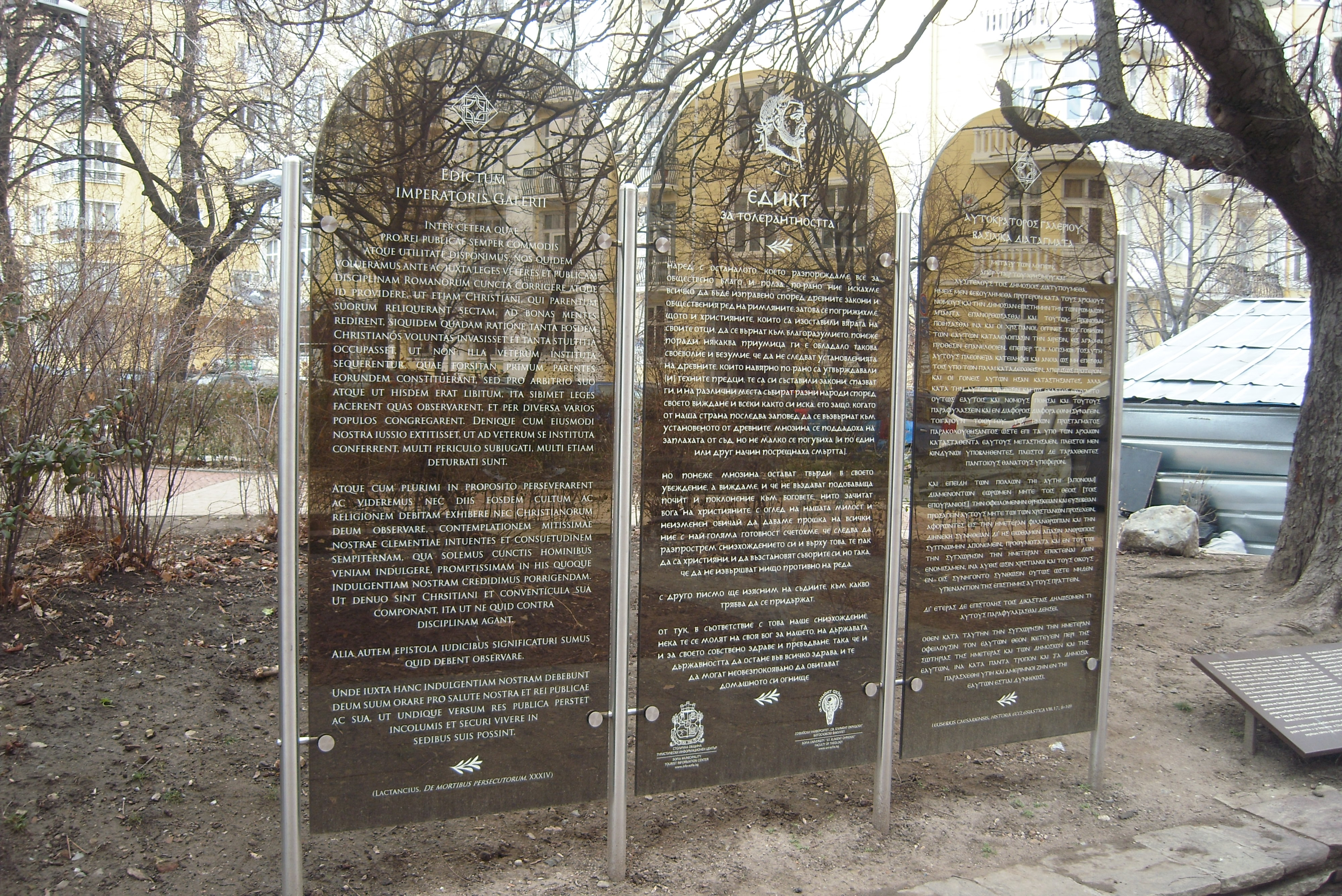
Roman Religion Edict of Toleration of Serdica, that established Christianity as a Religio licita.

An edict of toleration is a declaration, made by a government or ruler, and states that members of a given religion will not suffer religious persecution for engaging in their traditions' practices. Edicts may imply tacit acceptance of a state religion.

== History ==
=== Ancient times ===
- 550 BCE – The Jain principle of Anekantavada based on Ahimsa, forged by Tirthankara Vardhamana Mahavira, may have been the first Oral law for Conflict resolution of Relativism, including Religious pluralism and Syncretism.
- 539 BCE – The clay document Cyrus Cylinder, issued by Achaemenid Persian monarch Cyrus the Great, declares the restoration of the cult of Marduk in Babylon and of the temples of other peoples, including the Jews Second Temple.
- 500 BCE – The Song dynasty Great Learning, part of the Four Books and Five Classics authored by Zhu Xi, merged Legalist and Confucionist Chinese philosophies with Chan Buddhism and Daoism Chinese religions into his own form of Confucianism that became the official Chinese imperial religion.
- 260 BCE – The Maurya Empire Pillars of Ashoka inscriptions suggest that for the Jain-Buddhist emperor Ashoka, Dharma meant "a moral polity of active social concern, religious tolerance, ecological awareness, the observance of common ethical precepts, and the renunciation of war."
- 260 – The Edict of Toleration by Gallienus was promulgated in favor of Christians at the initiative of the Roman emperor Gallienus.
- 311 – The Edict of Serdica was issued by the Roman Tetrarchy of Galerius, Constantine and Licinius, officially ending the Diocletian persecution of Christianity by declaring it a religio licita in the Roman Religion.
- 313 – The Edict of Milan legalized Christianity across the whole Roman Empire.
- 361 – The Edict of restoration of state paganism issued by Julian the Apostate legalized all forms of Christianity as well as Judaism and Paganism.
- 500 – The Orphic Pythagorean Golden Verse 5th states: "Of all the [rest of] mankind, make him your friend who distinguishes himself by his virtue." which presents the Virtue ethics approach for Interfaith dialogue of the Ancient Greek religion through Agoras' Henotheist Piety.
- 800 – The Constitution of Medina ensured freedom of belief and practices for all citizens who "follow the believers". It also assured that representatives of all parties, Muslim or non-Muslim, should be present when consultation occurs or in cases of negotiation with foreign states.

=== Middle Ages ===
- 1368 – The Religion in the Mongol Empire was based on Freedom of religion. This earned Genghis Khan the title of "defender of religions" by the Muslims and it was even said that he was "one of the mercies of the Lord and one of the bounties of His Divine Grace".
- 1436 – The Compacts of Basel, based on the agreement from 1420 and approved in 1433 by the Council of Basel, were validated by the Crown of Bohemia through their acceptance by Catholics and Utraquists (moderate Hussites) at an assembly in Jihlava, under the consentment of King Emperor Sigismund, which introduced an Ecumenical limited toleration there. They state that "the word of God is to be freely and truthfully preached by the priests of the Lord, and by worthy deacons". 1485 Religious peace of Kutná Hora was established as the law of the Czech lands approved by both Catholic and Utraquist nobility, that the Utraquist and the Catholic faiths were declared equal in front of the law, and individuals without regards to their social status were free to choose their faith, and slander of anybody for their believes was made illegal.

=== Early modern period ===
- 1562 – The Edict of Saint-Germain, by Catherine de' Medici (the regent for the young Charles IX of France), issued an Ecumenical limited toleration that ended insistent persecutions of non-Catholics (mostly Huguenots), resulted from the 1516 Concordat of Bologna and a massacre of Huguenots a few week later open hostilities of the French Wars of Religion.
- 1568 – The Edict of Torda (or Turda), also known as the "Patent of Toleration" or "Act of Religious Tolerance and Freedom of Conscience", was an attempt by King John II Sigismund of Hungary to guarantee religious freedom in the realm. It broadened previous grants to Roman Catholics, Lutherans, and Calvinists so that they might include the Unitarian Church, allowing toleration without legal guarantees for other faiths.
- 1573 – The Warsaw Confederation made all Christian confessions equal in the Polish–Lithuanian Commonwealth.
- 1578 – The Mughal Empire Sulh-i-kul, or "Absolute Peace Policy", inspired by its emperor Akbar's Din-i Ilahi syncretic faith, defended and promoted Interfaith dialogue at least with Sikhism, Christianism, Buddhism, Jainism, and Hinduism. In such a way he even had a Vegan Prasada in a Langar with Guru Nanak.
- 1579 – The Union of Utrecht included a decree of toleration allowing personal freedom of religion. An additional declaration allowed provinces and cities that wished to remain Catholic to join the Union.
- 1598 – The Edict of Nantes, issued by the King of France, Henry IV, was the formal religious settlement which ended the first era of the French Wars of Religion, granting Huguenots legal recognition as well as limited religious freedoms, which included: freedom of public worship, the right of assembly, rights of admission to public offices and universities, and permission to maintain fortified towns. It was revoked in 1685 by Henry IV's grandson, Louis XIV, who once again proclaimed Protestantism to be illegal in France through the Edict of Fontainebleau.
- 1609 – The Letter of Majesty by Holy Roman Emperor Rudolph II, valid for the Kingdom of Bohemia and Duchies of Silesia, introduced freedom of religion and religious toleration for all population, including non-privileged classes.
- 1649 – The Maryland Toleration Act, also known as the "Act Concerning Religion", by this British North American colony's Province of Maryland colonial assembly under the organization of its founder family, the Calverts, mandated religious tolerance for Catholicism protection of hegemonic Anglicanism and created the first legal limitations on hate speech in the Anglo-Saxon world. It was revoked in 1654, before being reinstated again, and finally, repealed permanently following the Glorious Revolution 1692. The Maryland Toleration Act influenced related laws in other colonies and was an important predecessor to the First Amendment to the United States Constitution, which enshrined religious freedom in American law, over a century later.
- 1664 – The Edict of Toleration in the Electorate of Brandenburg predicted the Ecumenical tolerance of Protestant Christian denominations with each other.
- 1685 – The Edict of Potsdam allowed the reform of Huguenots in Lutheran Prussian Kingdom.
- 1689 – The Act of Toleration, by the Parliament of England, protected Protestants with the intentional exclusion of Roman Catholics and Quakers.
- 1692 – The Chinese Edict of Toleration, by the Kangxi Emperor of the Qing Dynasty, recognized the Roman Catholic Church and barred attacks on its churches and missions by legalizing the practice of Christianity in China.
- 1712 – The Tolerance Act of Ernst Casimir in Büdingen, amidst war and plague, guaranteed "vollkommene Gewissensfreiheit", or "complete freedom of conscience", by demanding in return that civil authorities and subjects to behave as honorable, decent, and Christian Civilians.
- 1723 – The United Grand Lodge of England's Anderson's Constitutions of Freemasonry states in its first article: "Let a man's religion or mode of worship be what it may, he is not excluded from the order, provided he believe in the glorious architect of heaven and earth, and practice the sacred duties of morality." providing Masonic lodges Policies until today.
- 1773 – The Tolerance Edict of Catherine II of Russia responded to domestic political disputes with Muslim Tatars by the acceptance of all religious denominations in the Russian Empire, except for the large number of Jews, who were under its rule since the First partition of Poland.
- 1781 – The Patent of Toleration and its following 1782 Edict of Tolerance, by the Holy Roman Emperor Joseph II, extended religious freedom to non-Catholic Christians living in Habsburg lands, including: Lutherans, Calvinists, Jews, and the Greek Orthodox. It was rescinded by Joseph II on his deathbed.
- 1784 – The Tolerance Edict of Elector Clemens Wenceslaus of Saxony allowed the toleration of Protestants in the Electorate of Trier.
- 1787 – The Edict of Versailles, by Louis XVI of France, proposed the end of persecutions of non-Catholics, including Huguenots and Jews.
- 1789 - the Declaration of the Rights of Man and of the Citizen by France's National Constituent Assembly proclaimed full freedom of religion in France.
- 1791 – The Constitution of the United States, based on the United States Bill of Rights, commands in its 1st Amendment the Freedom of religion in the United States in the following terms: "Congress shall make no law respecting an establishment of religion, or prohibiting the free exercise thereof".

=== Late modern period ===
- 1812 – The Prussian Jews Edict, by King Frederick William III of Prussia of Prussia, extended the rights of naturalized ("eingebürgeten") Jews living in the country.
- 1813 – The Unitarian Relief Act amended the Act of Toleration blasphemy laws by granting toleration for Unitarian worship to include non-Trinitarians among the Protestant dissenters whose practices were tolerated.
- 1839 – The Hawaiian Edict of Toleration, by Kamehameha III, allowed Catholic missionaries in addition to Protestant ones.
- 1844 – The Edict of Toleration was the beginning of the Zionist process of Jewish diaspora return to the Holy Land with its removal of Capital punishments for apostasy.
- 1847 – The Tolerance Edict of King Frederick William IV of Prussia has, among other things, allowed religious disaffiliation.

=== 20th century ===
- 1905 – The Edict of Toleration, by Tsar Nicholas II of Russia, gave legal status to religions other than the Russian Orthodox Church. It was followed by the 30 of October of 1906 Edict, the October Manifesto was signed by the Tzar that gave legal status to Orthodox schismatics and sectarians.
- 16 November 1993 – The Religious Freedom Restoration Act (RFRA) states that the "Government shall not substantially burden a person's exercise of religion even if the burden results from a rule of general applicability."

== See also ==
- Freedom of religion
- Religious tolerance
- Ecumenism
- Interfaith dialogue
- International Association for Religious Freedom
