= Czech Brethren =

The Czech Brethren may refer to:

- Evangelical Church of Czech Brethren, the biggest Czech Protestant church, founded 1918
- Church of Brethren (Czech Republic), an evangelical free church in the Czech Republic
- Moravian Church, a current church which evolved from Unity of the Brethren
- Unity of the Brethren Baptists, an association serving Brethren Baptist Christians in the Czech Republic

== See also ==
- Unity of the Brethren (disambiguation)
