= Altar Wings of Roudníky =

Two wings of a late Gothic retable

- Oltářní křídla z Roudník (Czech)
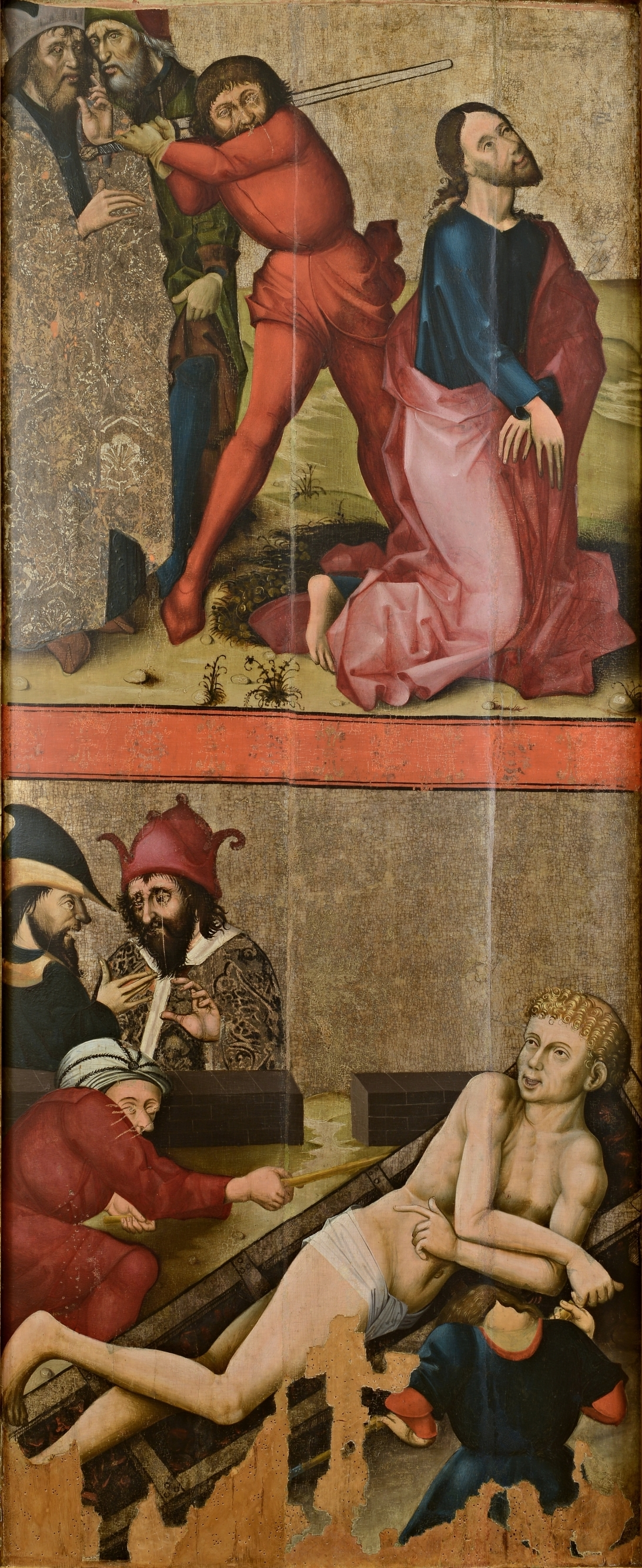
- Year: before 1486
- Dimensions: 179 cm × 82 cm (70 in × 32 in)
- Location: Hussite Museum, Tábor

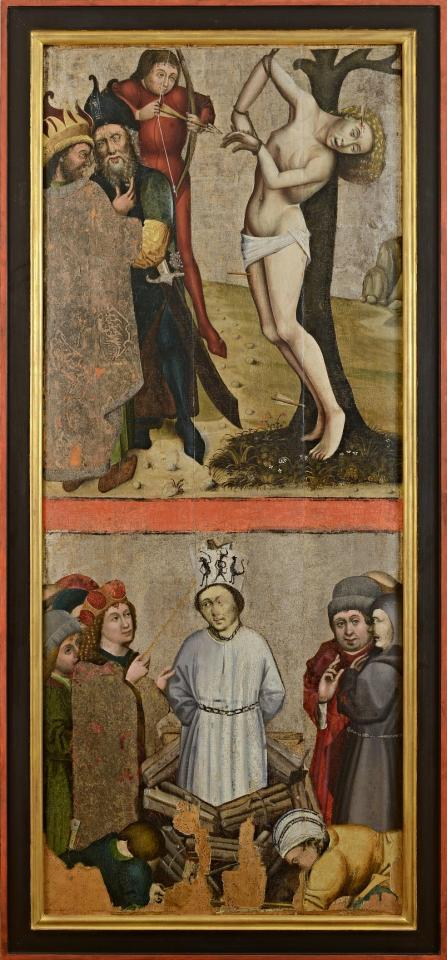
Right wing

The Altar Wings of Roudníky are two surviving wings of late Gothic retable, which probably originated in one of Prague's contemporary workshops for a Utraquist village parish church. The altar wings exhibited at the Hussite Museum in Tábor have the status of a national cultural monument in the Czech Republic.

Altar Wings of Roudníky are the two sides painted panels accrued before 1486. The wings were cut back and secondarily coated with baroque marbling, making reconversion survived the 17th and 18th centuries, since the inside of the right wing is the oldest depiction of the burning of Jan Hus depicted in the Czech Gothic panel painting. It is believed to be a fragment of an altarpiece, which has not survived. The anonymous painter portrayed "Crucifixion" and "The Last Supper", possibly in monstrance with the body of the Lord. Due to the fact both wing panels are shown, it is assumed the patrons were Jakoubek of Vřesovice, a Hussite captain from Roudníky, and his son John.

== Description ==
Each of the truncated wing plates has dimensions of 162 x 68 cm, framed 179 x 82 cm. The inner side of the left wing appears at the top of the Beheading of St. James the Great, while at the bottom is shown the Burning of St. Lawrence. The Beheading of St. James depicts two figures in discussion, one of which with a headdress in brocade in the form of a mitre, the High Priest Abiathar. The figure is a reference to the prelates who Hus condemned. In the lower part shows the Death of St. Lawrence, while the figure on the right is identifiable with the Emperor Decius. On the outer side of the plate is left St. James the Greater pilgrim's staff and St. Lawrence deacon holding the book and palm branch. The contralateral altar wing (board 2 inv. No. 4336) has on the inside at the top of Passion of Sebastian, and in the lower half of the burning of Jan Hus. On the outside is depicted St. James the Less, at the bottom of St. Stephen deacon. While the martyrdom of St. Sebastian depicts the Emperor Diocletian (left figure with a crown on his head), the "Burning" is dominated by the figure of a man with a princely cap. This represents Rhine Louis of Wittelsbach, to whom Sigismund handed Hus over for execution. On the altar, cover it and Jan Hus assigned to prvomučedníkům Christian church – St. James, Vol. Sebastian and St. Lawrence. The fact that the left bottom plate is shown "baking" St. Lawrence, while on the right wing is depicted the "burning of Jan Hus", is not accidental. These are parallels between the forms of martyrdom of the saints.

== Dating ==
The altar wings are neither dated nor signed. The time of their creation can be inferred either by comparing to the manuscript painters in contemporary context, or biographical content of the patron of the altar. Jaromir Pešina states that the author of the piece was in contact with the artist behind St. George's altar, whose work dates to early in the second half of the 15th century, newly assigned to Czech late Gothic panel painting. Milena Bartlová considered the painter as a member of the Prague workshop environment with knowledge of the Nuremberg Master’s (Hans Pleydenwurff) and Brussels patterns (Dirck Bouts). Jan Royt states that the artist who painted panels was aware of the Wrocław Master painting in the Altar of St. Barbara, which could be instrumental in these Western European influences. These conjectures allow dating the genesis of the retable in 1470 to 1480s. In the event that the purchaser of the altar was a Hussite captain Jakoubek of Vřesovice (died in 1467) dating the retable can be shifted to the 1460s. The Church of Saint Wenceslaus in Roudníky, for which it was intended, is already mentioned as a parish in 1352, and rebuilt in the Gothic style in 1486.

== The wings' fate ==
In 1966, during restoration of the village church, students of the Academy of Fine Arts, Prague discovered two door panels on which were concealed, beneath overpainting, a baroque quality pre-medieval painting dating to the 1470s. Restoration of the original painted panels was done by Bohuslav and Ludmila Slaný in 1975. The last conservation and restoration work on both boards conducted by academic painter Naděžda Mašková and Miroslav Křížek in the year 2013/14. The altar wings were bought from the Trmice parish in the Diocese of Litoměřice for the amount of CZK 12 million paid from the funds of the Ministry of Culture of the Czech Republic. Today it is one of the most important artistic artefacts, in the Hussite Museum in Tábor.

== Art-historical importance ==
The finding of altar wings of Roudniky became one of the few documented Utraquist works in the development of painting in Bohemia after a period of stagnation on topics and painting techniques at the time of George of Poděbrady. It was a diversion in Prague acting "Master of St. George's altar" from a conservative home environment and the influence of Nuremberg painting from the mid-15th century, which influenced the anonymous Master. The Roudniky panels also likely originate from the Prague workshop environment.

The meaning of the altar wings of Roudniky lies in their iconography. Illustrations of Jan Hus as a holy martyr are captured in their oldest form, as we know from the few surviving fragments of altars from the middle of the 15th century. This monumental painting presents us with Jan Hus as a man of small stature with a round face, beardless, dressed in a liturgical white shirt. His representation with other religious saints assigns him to providence, and the founding legitimacy of the early church. Utraquists needed to present their own saint, with the traditional saints, as one of the reasons their relationship to the paintings had religious themes. Conversely the painting served as a means of spreading reform ideas, but had a didactic function for laymen unfamiliar with iconography.

== Exhibitions ==
The altar wings of Roudniky was exhibited in the Teresian Wing of the Old Royal Palace at Prague Castle in the exhibition "Jan Hus 1415–2005" (30 June – 25 September 2005). Again, the two boards exhibited in the Imperial Stables at Prague Castle during the exhibition "Art of the Czech Reformation", which took place from 16 December 2009 to 4 April 2010. The new acquisition exhibiting an altar wing of the Hussite Museum in Tabor in February 2009, which is got into professional care at the end of 2012. the last two altar slabs enriched the exhibition "Prague Hus and the Hussite 1415–2015", which was held in the Clam-Gallas Palace in Prague from 25 September 2015 and 24 January 2016.

== Sources ==
- Homolka J. et al. Pozdně gotické umění v Čechách (1471-1526). Vydal Odeon, Praha, 1968.
- Beránek J. et al. Trans Montes, Podoby středověkého umění v severozápadních Čechách (Mudra A. a Ottová M,. eds.). Vydala Filozofická fakulta UK v Praze, 2014. ISBN 978-80-7308-537-7
