= Unity of the Brethren (Czech Republic) =

Ecclesiastical province of the Moravian Church

Unity of the Brethren Jednota bratrská
- Classification: Protestant
- Orientation: Hussite (Bohemian) with Lutheran Pietist influences
- Polity: Presbyterian
- Head bishop: Evald Rucký
- Associations: Moravian Church
- Region: Czech Republic
- Headquarters: Liberec, Czech Republic
- Origin: 1880
- Other names: Evangelical Church of the Brethren; Herrnhutian Church of the Brethren
- Official website: jbcr.cz

The Unity of the Brethren (Czech: Jednota bratrská) is the ecclesiastical province of the Moravian Church in the Czech Republic. Due to a schism in the province in 2000, eight of its original congregations comprise the so-called Herrnhut Seniorate of the Evangelical Church of Czech Brethren.

It is located in the lands (Bohemia and Moravia) of the origins of the Bohemian Reformation, a movement that later created the Moravian Church.

== Origins ==
The movement was originally started by a Catholic priest named Jan Hus in approximately 1405 as part of the Bohemian Reformation, making it one of the oldest Protestant denominations in Christianity. Hus is considered by some to be the first Church reformer, although some believe this to be John Wycliffe.

Hus opposed many aspects of the Catholic Church in Bohemia, including the Bohemian view of ecclesiology, simony and the Eucharist. He established a new group as a reaction to these practices and attempted to return the Church in Bohemia and Moravia to the practices of early Christianity. The movement gained royal support for a time but was eventually forced to be subject to Rome. Some of his followers publicly recognised Rome’s authority; however, the remaining Hussites continued to operate outside Roman Catholicism and, within fifty years of Hus's death, had become independently organized as the 'Bohemian Brethren' or Unity of the Brethren.

This group maintained Hussite theology (which later leaned towards Lutheran teachings). The first Brethren's congregation was founded in Kunvald, Bohemia, in 1457. After the expulsions of the Protestants from Czech lands during the 17th and 18th centuries, some families from Moravia, specifically from Fulnek and adjacent area, who preserved the traditions of the old Bohemian brethren, found refuge in Saxony. They established a new village called Herrnhut between 1722 and 1727. This was the beginning of the Moravian church as it is known today.

== History ==
Since 1781, Protestantism was tolerated again in the Czech and Austrian lands and most of the secret Protestants and Bohemian brethren entered the newly established Evangelical churches of either the Augsburg or the Helvetic confessions (the modern Evangelical Church of Czech Brethren and Silesian Evangelical Church of the Augsburg Confession). The Moravian church as it was established in Herrnhut in the early 18th century could establish its congregation in the Czech lands first after the imperial Protestant patent in 1861. The first congregation of the "renewed Unity of the Brethren" was established in 1870 in Potštejn. Until the end of World War II, a third of the congregations were German-speaking. In 1957, the independent Czech province of the Moravian church was officially established during the general synod of Unitas Fratrum.

In 1998 and 1999, a conflict escalated in the province concerning many theological and ecclesiological questions and it was not possible to maintain the unity of the province any further. Part of the congregations that wanted to retain the traditional forms of liturgy left the independent Czech province (Jednota bratrská) and formed a newly-established Herrnhut Seniorate (Ochranovský seniorát) of the Evangelical Church of Czech Brethren which remained part of the world-wide Moravian Church.

In 2023, the Moravian Church consists of 19 provinces and several mission fields on four continents. The Unity is bound by the Church Order of the ‘’Unitas Fratrum’’, a document written by the Unity Synod (the highest legislative body within the Moravian Church).

The province also runs a number of schools and vocational training centres.

== Beliefs ==
The church follows the beliefs of the Apostles’ Creed, the Athanasian Creed, the Nicene Creed and Luther's Small Catechism.

== See also ==
- History of the Moravian Church
- Unity of the Brethren (Texas)
- Evangelical Church of Czech Brethren
