= History of the Moravian Church =

This article covers the period from the origin of the Moravian Church, as well as the related Hussite Church and Unity of the Brethren, in the early fourteenth century to the beginning of mission work in 1732. Further expanding the article, attention will also be paid to the early Moravian settlement at Bethlehem, Pennsylvania, following their first arrival in Nazareth, Pennsylvania in 1740.

== History ==
=== 15th century ===
The movement that would develop into the Moravian Church was started by a Catholic priest named Jan Hus (in English John Hus) in the early 15th century. The Church was established as a reaction to practices of the Roman Catholic Church. Hus wanted to return the Church in Bohemia and Moravia to the practices of early Christianity: performing the liturgy in the language of the people, allowing lay people to receive both the bread and the cup during communion, and eliminating Papal indulgences and the idea of purgatory. The movement gained royal support and a certain independence for a while, even spreading across the border into Poland, but was eventually forced to be subject to the governance of Rome. A contingency of Hus's followers struck a deal with Rome that allowed them to realise most of their doctrinal goals, while recognising the authority of the Roman Catholic Church; these were called the Utraquists. The remaining Hussites continued to operate outside Roman Catholicism and, within fifty years of Hus's death, had become independently organized as the 'Bohemian Brethren' or Unity of the Brethren. This group maintained Hussite theology (which would later lean towards Lutheran teachings), while maintaining the historic episcopate, even during their persecution. The Bohemian Brethren's Church was founded in Kunvald, Bohemia, in 1457.

=== 16th century ===
The Moravians were one of the earliest Protestant Churches, rebelling against the authority of Rome some fifty years before Martin Luther. One unusual and (for its time) shocking belief was the group's eventual focus on universal education. By the middle of 16th century as many as 90% of the inhabitants of the Czech lands were Protestant. The majority of nobility was Protestant, the schools and printing-shops established by the Moravian Church were flourishing. Very often the Brethren were protected by local nobles who joined their ranks to assert their independence from Habsburg Vienna. By the middle of the 16th century, there was not a single town without a Protestant school in the Czech lands, and many had more than one, mostly with two to six teachers each. In Jihlava, a principal Protestant center in Moravia, there were six schools: two Czech, two German, one for girls and one teaching in Latin, which was at the level of a high / grammar school, lecturing on Latin, Greek and Hebrew, Rhetorics, Dialectics, fundamentals of Philosophy and fine arts, as well as religion according to the Lutheran Augustana. With the University of Prague also firmly in hands of Protestants, the local Catholic church was unable to compete in the field of education. Therefore, the Jesuits were invited, with the backing of the Catholic Habsburg rulers, to come to the Czech lands and establish a number of Catholic educational institutions, foremost the Academy in Prague and the Academy in Olomouc, Moravian capital.

=== 17th century ===
The nobility was able to force the emperor Rudolf II to issue Letter of Majesty in 1609, safeguarding the religious freedom in the Kingdom of Bohemia. Rudolf II was succeeded in 1612 by his brother, the Emperor Matthias who sought to install the fiercely Catholic Ferdinand of Styria on the Bohemian throne (which was conjoined with that of the March of Moravia), but in 1618 the Protestant Bohemian, Moravian, and Austrian noblemen, who feared losing religious freedom (two of the Protestant churches being already forcibly closed), started the Bohemian Revolt. The Revolt was defeated in 1620 in the Battle of White Mountain. As consequence the people who were involved in the revolt were either executed or expelled from the country.

By 1629, Protestants were offered an ultimatum. They were forced to choose to either leave the many and varied southeastern principalities of what was the Holy Roman Empire (mainly Austria, Bohemia, Moravia, some principalities within Silesia and parts of Germany and its many states), or to convert to Catholicism and to practice their beliefs illegally and secretly. The Brethren were forced to operate underground and eventually dispersed across Northern Europe as far as the Low Countries, where Bishop John Amos Comenius attempted to direct a resurgence. The largest remaining communities of the Brethren were located in Lissa in Poland, which had historically strong ties with the Czechs, and in small, isolated groups in Bohemia and Moravia.

=== 18th century ===
Illustration of Nicolaus Ludwig Zinzendorf preaching

Nicolaus Ludwig Zinzendorf was a nobleman born in 1700 in Dresden, Saxony, in present-day eastern Germany, where he was brought up in the traditions of Pietism. Zinzendorf studied law at university in accordance with the wishes of his family, but his main interests were in the pursuit of his religious ideas. In 1722 he left the court in Dresden to spend more time on his estates at Berthelsdorf, where he hoped to establish a model Christian community.

Out of a personal commitment to helping the poor and needy, Zinzendorf agreed to a request (from an itinerant carpenter named Christian David) that persecuted Protestants from Moravia should be allowed to settle on his lands. Among those who came were members of the Bohemian Brethren who had been living as an underground remnant in Moravia for nearly 100 years since the days of Comenius.

In 1722, the refugees established a new village called Herrnhut, about 2 miles from Berthelsdorf. The town initially grew steadily, but major religious disagreements emerged and by 1727 the community was divided into warring factions. Zinzendorf used a combination of feudal authority and his charismatic personality to restore a semblance of unity, then on 13 August 1727 the community underwent a dramatic transformation when the inhabitants of Herrnhut "Learned to love one another." following an experience which they attributed to a visitation of the Holy Spirit, similar to that recorded in the Bible on the day of Pentecost. Many issues were settled by this renewal or revival and, while different doctrinal views still occasionally threatened the unity of the community, Count Zinzendorf was able to maintain harmony of spirit from then on, so the revival could continue unhindered.

Herrnhut grew rapidly following this transforming revival and became the centre of a major movement for Christian renewal and mission during the 18th century. Moravian historians identify the main achievements of this period as:

1. Establishing a prayer watch of continuous prayer which ran uninterrupted, 24 hours a day, for 100 years.
2. Originating the Losungen, the "Daily Watchwords," on 3 May 1728, published today in 50 languages, the oldest and most widely read daily devotional work in the world. Old Testament texts, the "Watchwords", are chosen by lot annually in Herrnhut from a collection of 1200 verses; the New Testament texts, "Doctrinal Texts," are then selected to comment on the Watchwords. This is an ecumenical ministry of the worldwide Moravian Unity that transcends confessional, political and racial barriers of all kinds.
3. Establishing over 30 settlements globally on the Herrnhut model, which emphasised a lifestyle of prayer and worship and a form of communal living in which personal property was still held but simplicity of lifestyle and generosity with wealth were considered important spiritual attributes. As a result, divisions between social groups and extremes of wealth and poverty were largely eliminated.
4. Sending out hundreds of Christian missionaries to many parts of the world including the Caribbean, North and South America, the Arctic, Africa, and the Far East.
5. The Moravian missionaries were the first large scale Protestant missionary movement. They were also first to send unordained "lay" people (rather than trained professional clergymen), the first to go to enslaved people, and the first in many countries of the world. The first Moravian missionaries were a potter named Johann Leonhard Dober and a carpenter named David Nitschmann, who went to the Caribbean island of St Thomas in 1732.
6. Forming many hundreds of small renewal groups operating within the existing churches of Europe, known as "diaspora societies". These groups encouraged personal prayer and worship, bible study, confession of sins and mutual accountability.

==== Pennsylvania ====
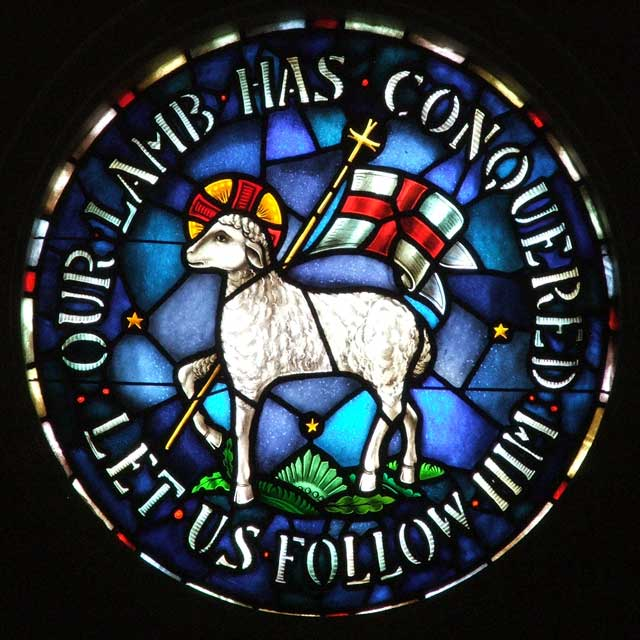
The seal of the Moravian Church featuring the Agnus Dei in stained glass at the Rights Chapel of Trinity Moravian Church in Winston-Salem, North Carolina

Before finally settling in Pennsylvania, and later founding another settlement in North Carolina, the Moravians initially made an attempt at settlement in Georgia for their mission work. Upon settlement in Georgia, due to various complications including impending war and leadership withdrawal, a select several of the Moravian settlers moved from Georgia to Bethlehem, Pennsylvania in 1740. Missionary settlers in Bethlehem were part of one of the oldest recognized Protestant denominations in the world, the Unitas Fratrum or the Unity of the Brethren which began in 1457 in what is now the Czech Republic.

After years of persecution in their native land, many from the old Unity immigrated to Germany where they began settling on Zinzendorf's estate in 1722. With a renewed spirit of purpose, they began sending out missionaries in 1732 and over the years developed a far-flung mission movement that lives on today in Moravian churches, schools, and communities in Europe, the Caribbean, Central America, North America, South America, Nepal, and Africa. While the prime objective of reaching the colonies was to convert the Native population of the Delaware River region, the Moravian method of evangelizing was not always looked upon kindly or welcomed.

The modern Unitas Fratrum or Moravian Church, with about 825,000 members worldwide, continues to draw on traditions established during the 18th century renewal. In many places it observes the convention of the lovefeast, originally started in 1727, and continues to use older and traditional music in worship. In addition, in some older congregations Moravians are buried in a traditional God's Acre, a graveyard organized by gender, age, and marital status rather than family. The Moravians continue their long tradition of missionary work, for example in the West Indies of the Caribbean and Greenland. This is reflected in their broad global distribution. The Moravians in Germany, whose central settlement remains at Herrnhut, are highly active in education and social work. The American Moravian Church sponsors Moravian College and Seminary, recognized as the sixth-oldest institution of higher education in the United States. The largest concentration of Moravians today is in Tanzania.

The motto of the Moravian church is:

(in Latin) In necessariis unitas, in dubiis libertas, in omnibus caritas

(in English) "In essentials, unity; in nonessentials, liberty; and in all things, love"

=== 19th century ===
In the 1800s, Hussite immigrants to the United States organized in Texas, where they established the Unity of the Brethren.

The Brethren who stayed in the Czech lands during Catholic persecution gained again some religious freedom thanks to the Patent of Toleration in 1781. However, the new law did not enable them to revive an independent church to continue the tradition of the Bohemian Reformation. They had to join either the Evangelical Church of the Augsburg Confession or the Evangelical Church of the Helvetic Confession. In 1918, they were united into the Evangelical Church of Czech Brethren.

=== 20th century ===
In 1920, the Czechoslovak Church was established by Roman Catholic modernist clergy as a national church of newly formed Czechoslovakia. In 1971, the church started to use the name Czechoslovak Hussite Church with the aim to continue the Hussite tradition. The Czechoslovak Hussite Church recognizes seven sacraments: baptism, eucharist, penance, confirmation, holy matrimony, holy orders, and anointing of the sick. By the 1950s, the membership of the Hussite Church numbered over one million. It is headed by a patriarch.

== See also ==
- Religious peace of Kutná Hora
