= St George's Altar =

Gothic altarpiece

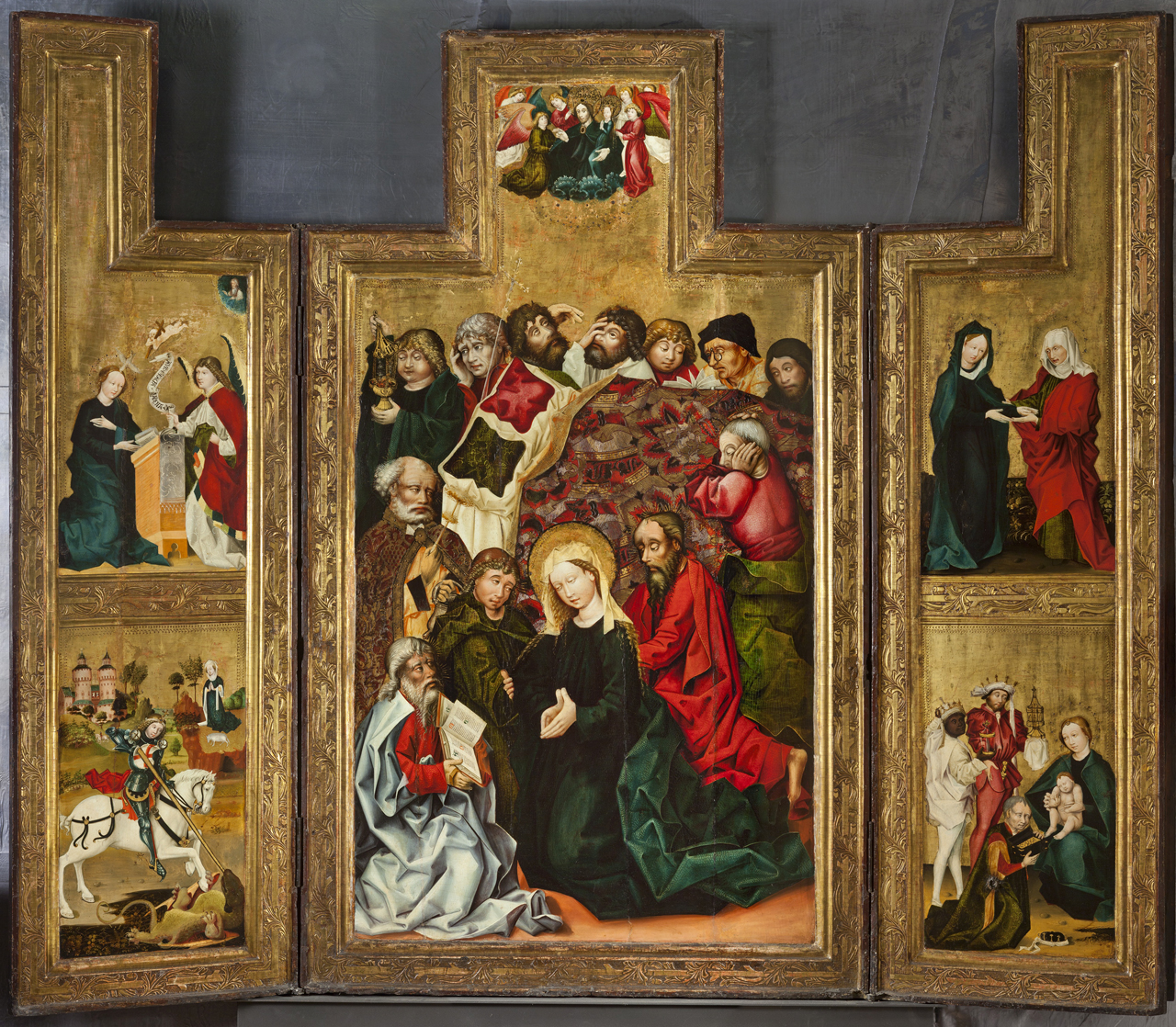
Altar of St. George (Altar with the Death of the Virgin Mary) (around 1470), National Gallery Prague

St George's Altar (or Altar with the Death of the Virgin Mary) is a large Gothic altarpiece from the 1460s-70s, originally placed in the St. George's Convent at Prague Castle. It belongs to the property of the Metropolitan Chapter of St. Vitus Cathedral and is on loan to the exhibition of medieval art of the National Gallery in Prague.

== History ==
The altar was originally located in the chapel dedicated to the Virgin Mary in the St. George's Convent. Most studies place its creation around 1470, when the monastery's furnishings were being restored after the Hussite Wars under the reign of Abbess Anna of Kotopek. This is evidenced by the depiction of the donors - the kneeling abbess and the canon - on the back of the altar wings, as well as a scene from the Saint George's legend.

As a starting point and source of inspiration for the Master of the St. George's Altar are usually referred to graphic designs of Master E. S. and Nuremberg productions before 1450 influenced by Dutch painting, in particular the Master of the Tucher Altarpiece, the Master of the Löffelholz Altarpiece (a pupil of Hans Pleydenwurff), the Wurzach Altarpiece (Hans Multscher) and the Albrecht Altarpiece.

== Description and classification ==
Tempera on linden wood panels covered with linen (centre and inner sides of the wings), dimensions: central panel: 192.5 x 114 cm, wings: 192 x 56.5 cm. The altar has an original frame decorated with a carved relief depicting a stylized branch with leaves.

The central scene represents the so-called Last Prayer of the Virgin Mary among the Apostles, connected in the upper part with the Assumption of the Virgin Mary with the blessing of Christ and the angels. Mary kneels with clasped hands before the Apostle holding an open book and is set in the composition in the intersection of two diagonals formed by the figures of the four Apostles. Together with the apostles standing behind the bed, all the heads form an ellipse. The faces of the apostles have individual features, and the scene is enlivened by small genre details and a variety of gestures. The draperies of the Virgin Mary and the kneeling apostle are stylized in a way that is characteristic of the late Gothic style of the so-called pressed or broken folds. The deathbed and the cloak of Saint Peter are decorated with the technique of gilded tin-plated relief (pressed brocade).

On the wings of the altar are three scenes from the life of the Virgin Mary (Annunciation, Visitation, Adoration of the Magi) and the Wrestling of St. George with the Dragon. The central image and the three scenes from the life of the Virgin have a uniform gilded background decorated along the frame with hallmarking. The exception is the scene of St. George and the Dragon, where the gilded background is preceded by a perspective representation of an open landscape with a castle and the figure of the rescued princess.

On the back of the outer wings is St. Wenceslaus on the left, with the abbess kneeling before St. Philip (with cross) and St. Simon (with saw) below him, St. George on the right, and the donor kneeling before St. Andrew at the bottom. The rear side of the frame is unadorned and the background is decorated with gilding on a red bolus ground.

The double depiction of Saint George may also have a contemporary significance. In addition to being the patron saint of St. George's Convent at Prague Castle, he also has a role in Christian iconography as a defender of Christianity against pagans and may have been a symbol of King George of Poděbrady's efforts to unite European rulers in defence against the invading Turks.

The Master of the St George's Altar probably stayed in Nuremberg in the 1460s and was also familiar with the Swabian and Viennese artistic milieu. The sculptural carved ornament on the frames testifies to the contact with Silesian art. His workshop was active in Prague until about the 1480s and supplied his works from there to Northwest Bohemia or Kutná Hora.

The St George's Altar is a work of above-average value, in which fully mature late Gothic principles are applied. According to Pešina, it "belongs to the first and supreme manifestations of the new style aesthetics on Czech soil" and introduces the image of landscape into Czech Gothic painting. The Dutch influence is not only manifested in its individual details, but also in its overall conception.

=== Gallery ===
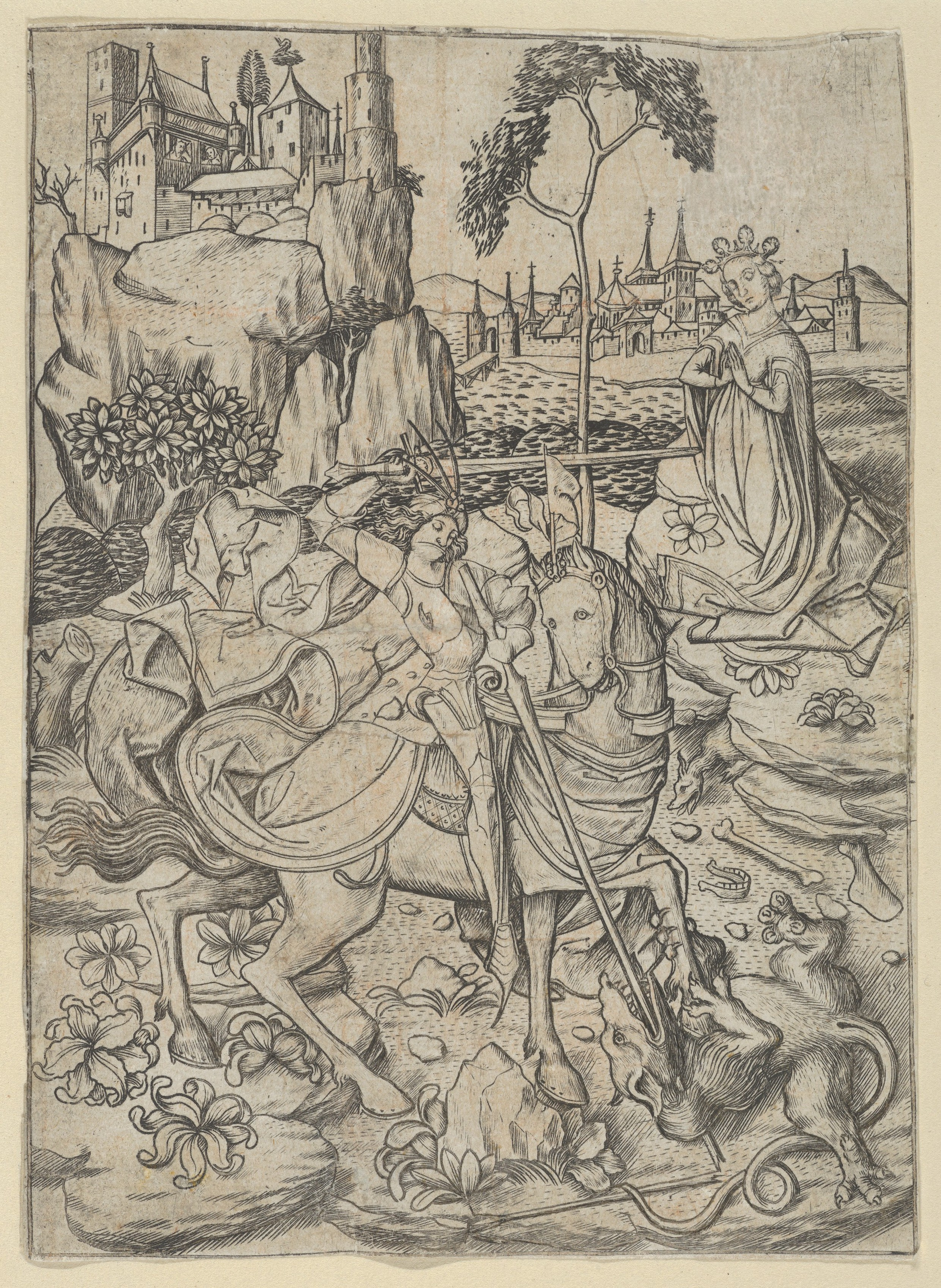
Master E. S., St George, from the series The Apostles

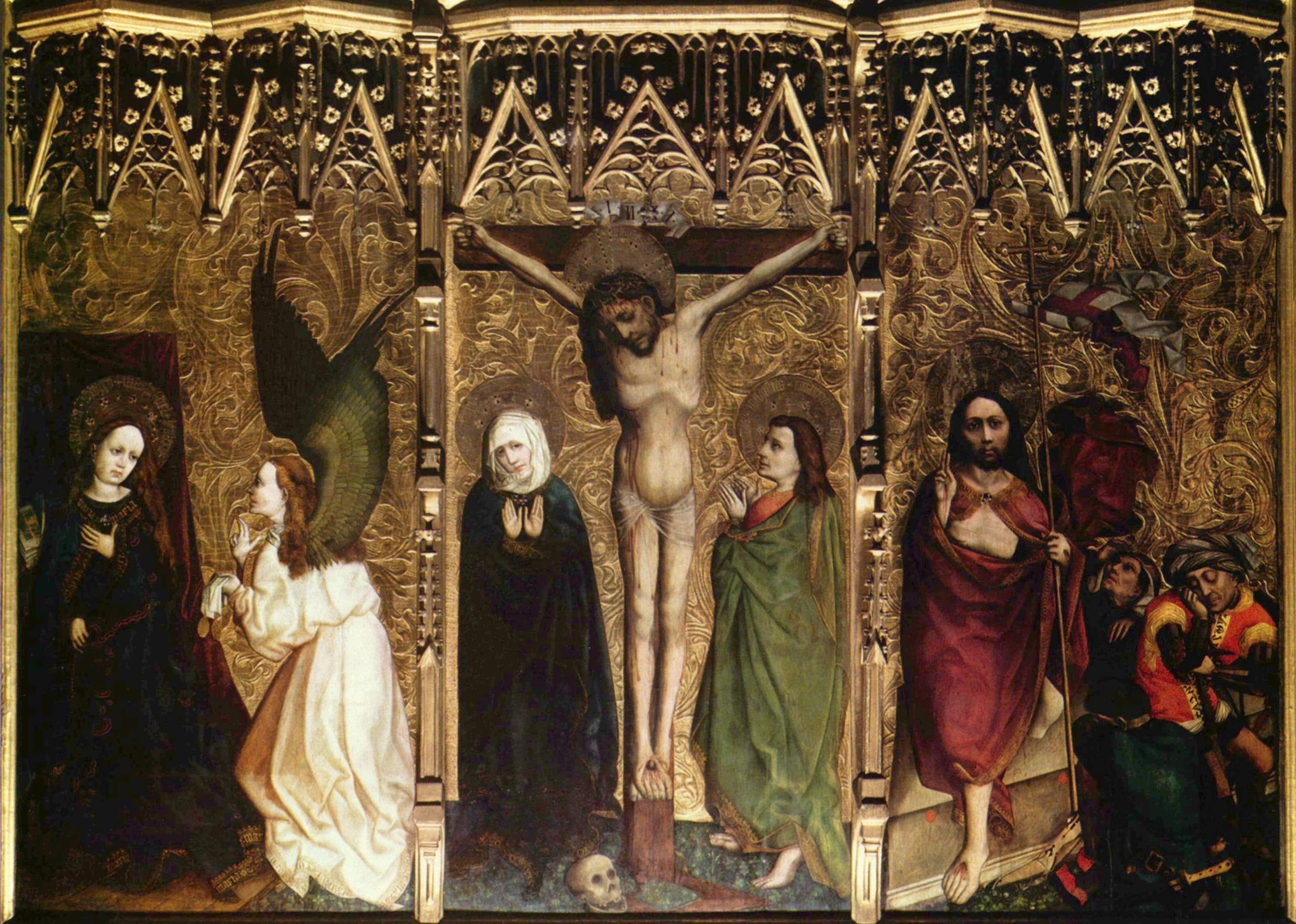
Master of the Tucher Altarpiece, central panel

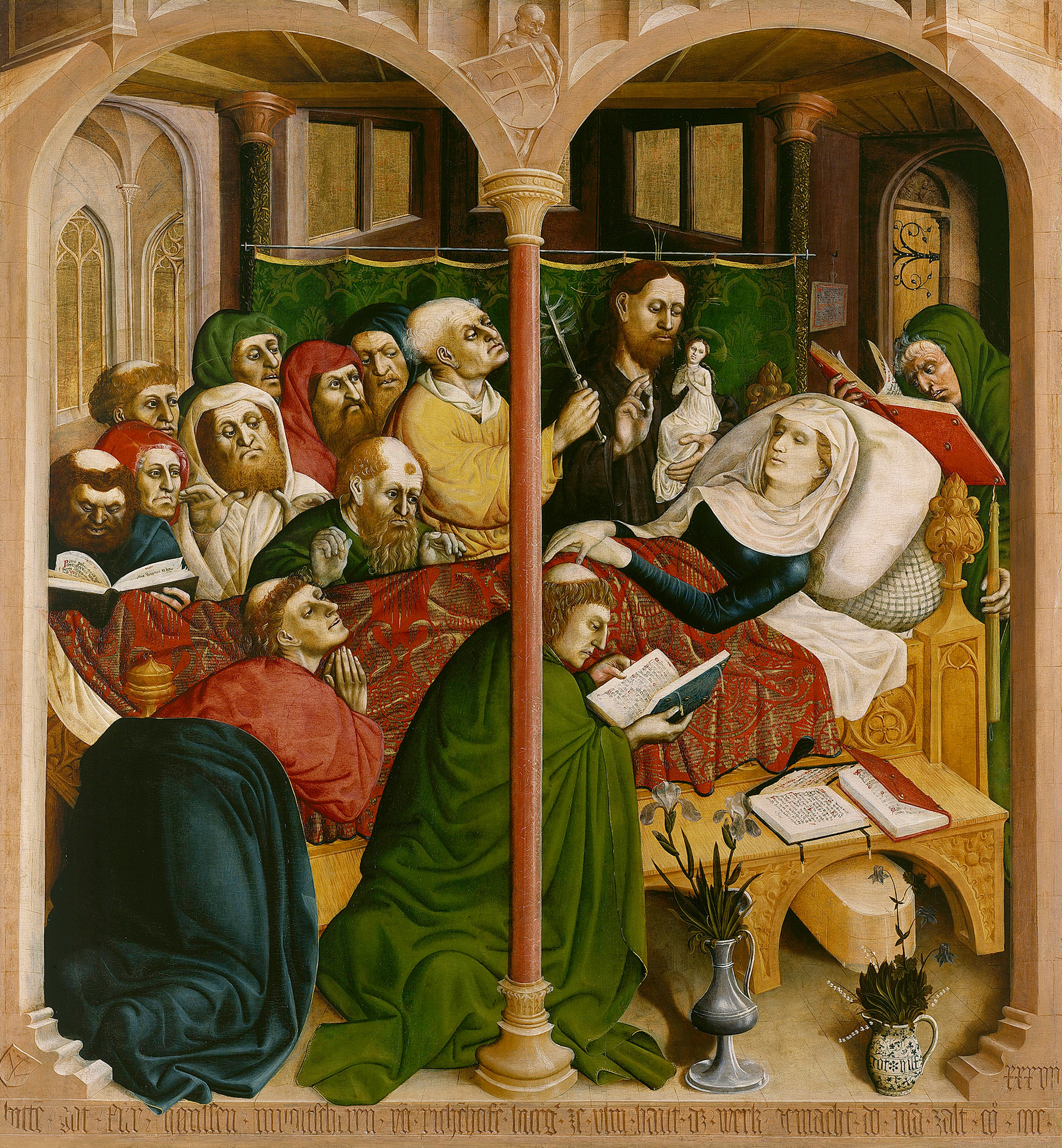
Hans Multscher - right wing of the Wurzach Altar - Google Art Project

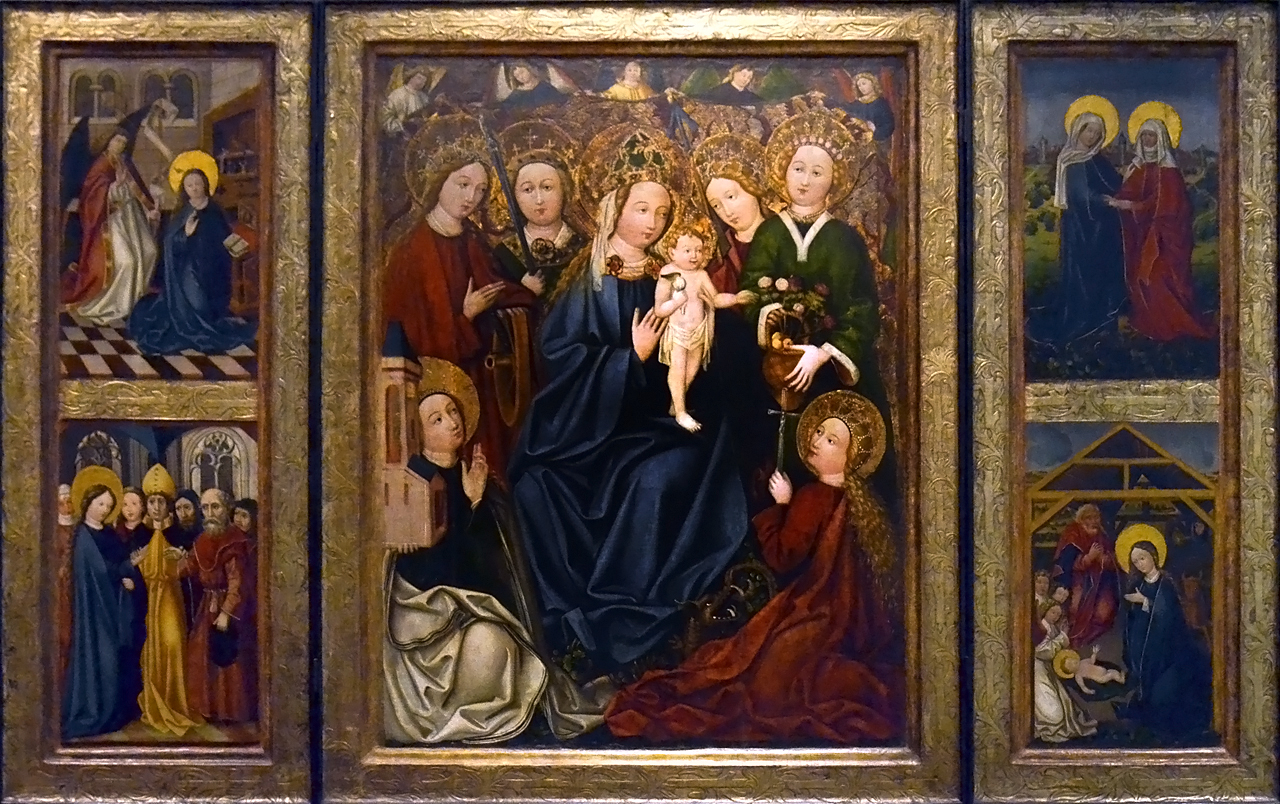
Thunovský Altar

=== Works attributed to the workshop of the Master of the St. George's Altar ===
- St. Barbara triptych (Smíškovská Chapel, St. Barbara's Church in Kutná Hora)
- Triptych called Thunovský (National Gallery Prague)
- panels with saints from Litoměřice - a series of small plate paintings representing St. Barbara, St. Dorota, St. Catherine and St. Voršila, as well as panels with scenes of the Visitation of the Virgin Mary and the Adoration of the Magi, which come from the collections of the bishop's residence in Litoměřice
- four altar extensions from Kadan (National Gallery Prague)
- workshop (?): altar wings from the Church of Saint Wenceslaus in Roudnice (now in Hussite Museum in Tábor)

== Sources ==
- Fajt J, Chlumská Š, Bohemia and Central Europe 1220–1550, National Gallery in Prague 2014, ISBN 978-80-7035-569-5, pp. 82–84
- Lenka Hejzlarová, St. George's Altar, An Attempt at a New View, Bachelor's thesis, MUNI in Brno, 2010
- Jan Klípa, Master of the St. George's Altar. Its place in Czech panel painting of the last third of the 15th century, Master's thesis, UDU FFUK in Prague, 2002
- L. K. (Ladislav Kesner), catalogue entry Master of the St. George's Altar, in. Collection of Old European Art. Collection of Old Czech Art I., Prague, 1984, pp. 274–275
- Jaroslav Pešina, Panel Painting, in: Jaromír Homolka, Josef Krása, Václav Mencl, Jaroslav Pešina, Josef Petráň, Late Gothic Art in Bohemia 1471 - 1526, Prague, 1978, p. 318
- Jaroslav Pešina, Czech Painting of the Late Gothic and Renaissance, Prague, 1950, p. 25
