= Unity of the Brethren (Texas) =

American Moravian Christian denomination

- Orientation: Hussite
- Polity: Presbyterian
- Region: Texas
- Language: English
- Origin: 19th century
- Congregations: 28
- Members: 3,500
- Official website: brethrenunity.org

The Unity of the Brethren is a Protestant church formed in the 1800s by Czech immigrants to Texas, where the church is still based, in the tradition of Moravian Church.

== Restoration in Texas ==
From about the middle of the 19th century until the outbreak of the First World War, a number of Czech Protestants immigrated to the United States. In many parts of the U.S. they formed Czech congregations within the Presbyterian Church. Some who settled as farmers in the state of Texas decided to form their own denomination. Jindřich Juren (1850–1921) came to Texas in 1876, and from 1881 to 1888 was the only minister to these Brethren congregations. Representatives of these congregations met in 1903 and formed the Evangelical Unity of the Bohemian-Moravian Brethren in North America. The early churches reflected their origin and worshipped in Czech. By the 1940s, most of the churches reflected assimilation into the surrounding culture and worshipped in English. In 1959, the name Unity of the Brethren was adopted.

=== Doctrine ===
This body accepts the Apostles' Creed as a valid expression of their beliefs, and stresses the ancient motto, "In essentials, unity; in non-essentials, liberty; in all things, love." They believe the Bible is God's revelation to man, the sourcebook for all spiritual truth; that one God is revealed in three persons; that Christ is the only way of salvation; that salvation is by grace through faith; that the Holy Spirit dwells in believers; and that Jesus Christ will return to judge the world and reward the faithful believers. The Unity practices two sacraments—water baptism and holy communion. Christian parents present their infant children for baptism. All Christians are invited to commune with them at the Lord's Supper or communion. However, they do not regard full agreement on the elements, methods and modes of the sacraments as essential. They believe that love is the supreme evidence of Christian disciples.

=== Church emblem ===
The Unity of the Brethren church has adopted a church emblem having an open Bible, with a cross behind in the center, and a chalice in front to the left. According to the church, the "cross represents Christ as the resurrected and living Lord, the Bible is the sourcebook of all Christian truth, open for all to explore, while the chalice holds special significance for Brethren: not only is it a symbol of the Lord's Supper, but it is also a reminder of the pre-Reformation insistence of John Hus and the early Brethren upon receiving wine as well as bread in Holy Communion."

=== Status ===
Currently the church is made up of 28 congregations with an estimated membership of 3500, with all except one located in the state of Texas. The location of the majority of churches is roughly the area from West, Temple, to Austin to Houston. The synod meets every two years. The Unity of the Brethren maintains several ministry organizations, including the Board of Christian Education; Brethren Youth Fellowship; Brethren Bookstore, operated in Caldwell, Texas; Brethren Journal (founded 1902); Christian Sisters Unity; Friends of the Hus Encampment; Grants and Bequests Board; the Hus Institute for Lay Leadership (which meets with the various congregations); and the Mutual Aid Society. The Hus Encampment Facility is located near Caldwell, Texas. They have no seminary, but support the Moravian Theological Seminary in Bethlehem, Pennsylvania. Three missionary families are serving in Honduras and Mexico.

== See also ==
- Unity of the Brethren (Czech Republic)
- Texaňané
