= Utraquism =

15th-century Protestant doctrine held by the Hussites

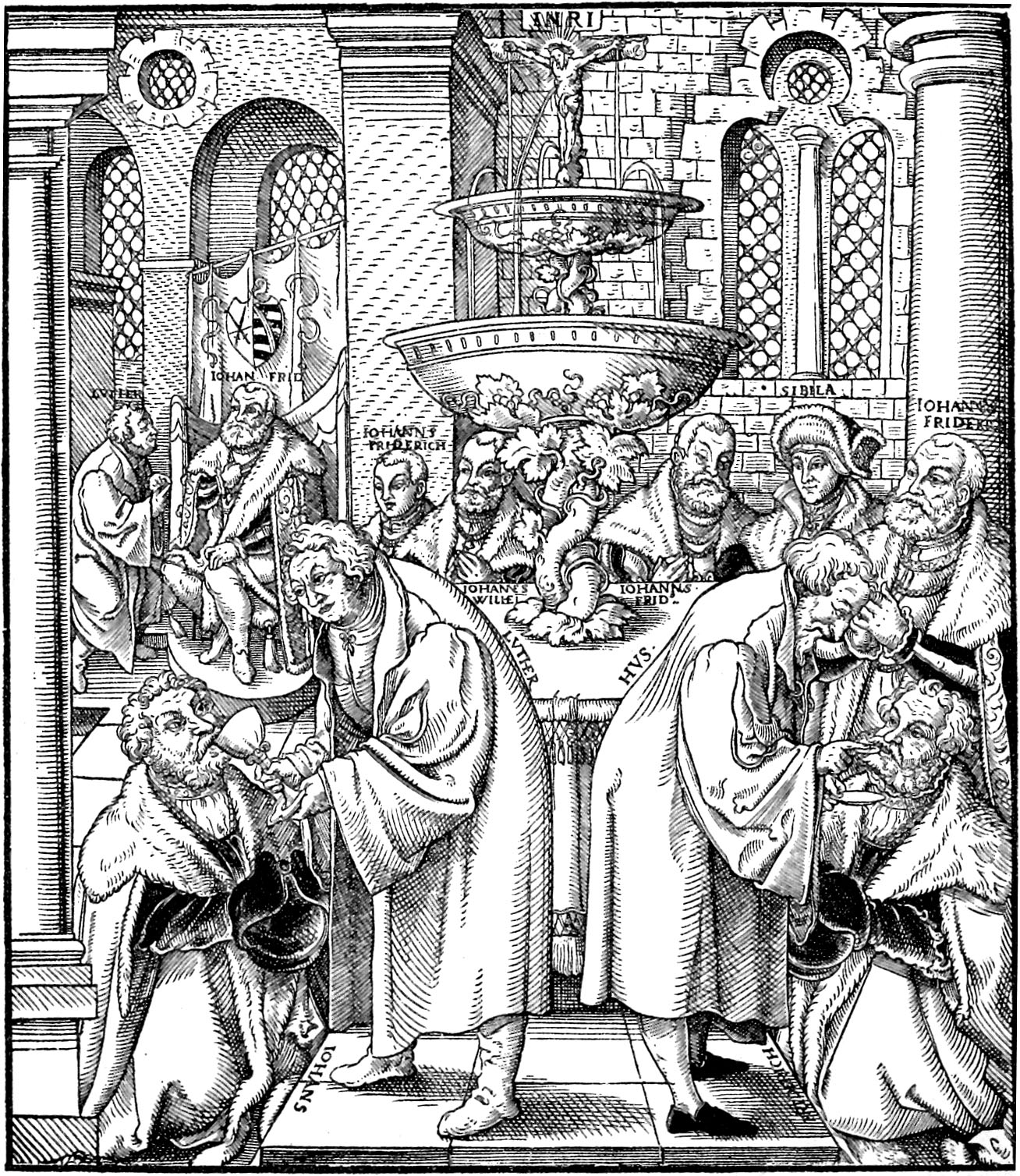
Luther and Hus serving communion under both kinds together, an imaginative woodcut from 16th-century Saxony representing the affinity of Lutherans and Moderate Hussites

Utraquism (from the Latin sub utraque specie, meaning "under both kinds"), also called Calixtinism (from chalice; Latin: calix, borrowed from Greek kalyx, "shell, husk"; Czech: kališníci), was a belief amongst Hussites, a pre-Protestant reformist Christian movement in fifteenth century Bohemia that communion under both kinds (both the consecrated host and the precious blood, as opposed to the consecrated host alone) should be administered to the laity during the celebration of the Eucharist. Communion in both kinds was a principal dogma of the Hussites and one of the Four Articles of Prague.

After the Hussite movement split into various factions early in the Hussite Wars, Hussites that emphasized the laity's right to communion under both kinds became known as Moderate Hussites, Utraquist Hussites, or simply Utraquists. The Utraquists were the largest Hussite faction.

== History ==
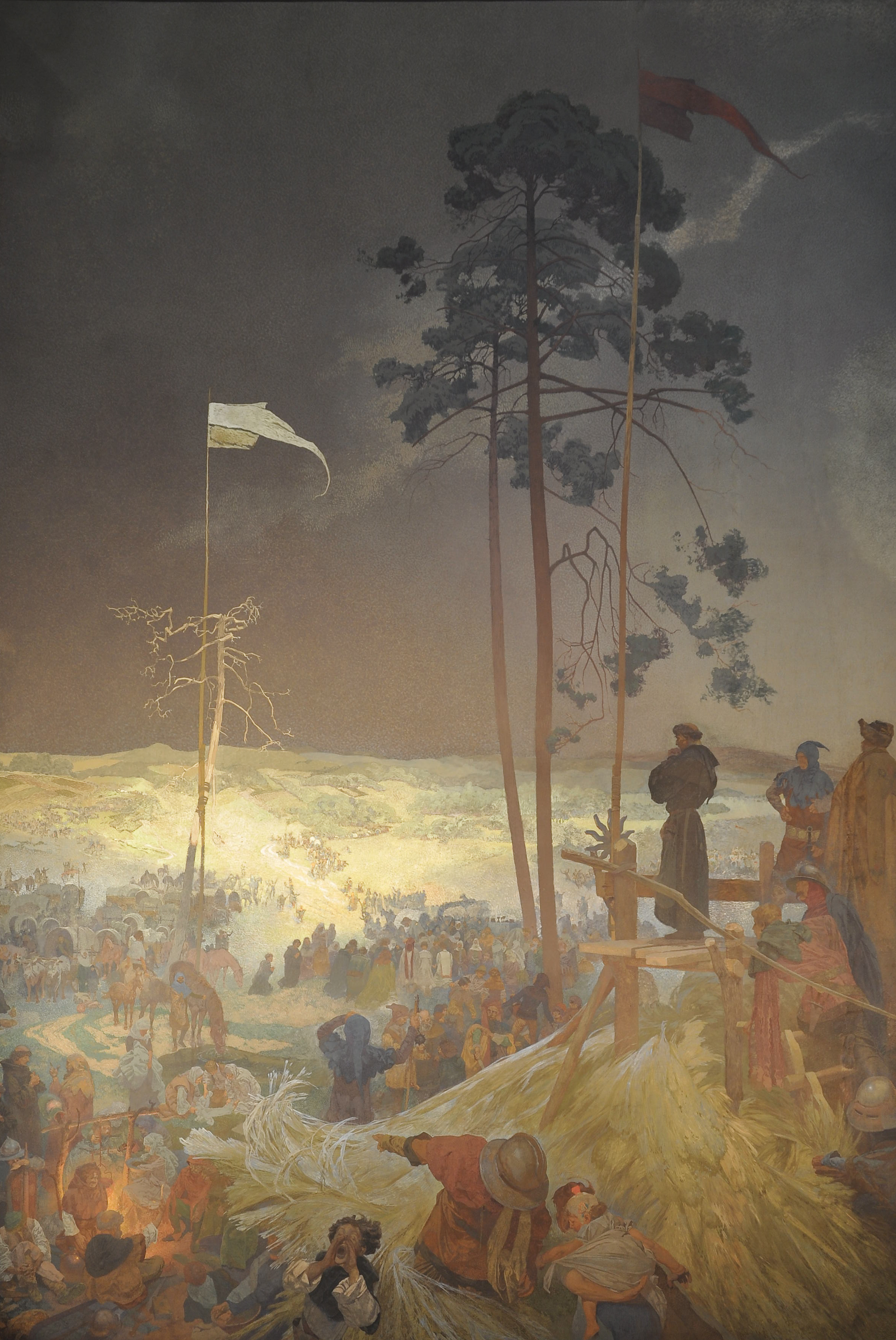
The Meeting at Křížky: Sub Utraque (1916), by Alphonse Mucha, The Slav Epic

Utraquism was a Christian dogma first proposed by Jacob of Mies, professor of philosophy at the University of Prague, in 1414. It maintained that the Eucharist should be administered "under both kinds" – as both sacred host and precious blood – to all the congregation, including the laity. The practice among Roman Catholics at the time was for only the priests to partake of the consecrated wine, the Precious Blood.

Jacob taught that communion should be provided and taken under both kinds, which as a precept of Christ could not be changed by the church. Only those who received the utraquist (both kinds) communion belong to the church of Christ. There is disagreement in sources about whether he, or early Utraquists, taught this was necessary for salvation (as claimed by Catholic detractors such as Andrew of Brod), or necessary to receive the salvific effect of the eucharist or an obligation.

The 15th century Utraquists were a moderate faction of the Hussites with strong respect for the sacrament and, generally, endorsed transubstantiation and Catholicity (in contrast to the more radical Taborites, Orebites and Orphans who were closer to the beliefs of John Wycliffe). They were also known as the Prague Party or the Calixtines – from calix, Latin for their "emblem", the chalice.

The Utraquists eventually allied themselves with the Catholic forces (following the Council of Basel) and defeated the more radical Taborites and Orphans at the Battle of Lipany in 1434. After that battle, nearly all forms of Hussite revival were Utraquist, as seen with George of Poděbrady, who even managed to cause the town of Tábor, the famous Taborite stronghold, to convert to Utraquism.

An agreement of mutual accommodation was agreed in 1485 between Catholics and Utraquists: the religious peace of Kutná Hora ended the Hussite wars. Following the victory of allied Utraquist and Catholic forces in the Hussite Wars, Utraquists constituted a majority of the Bohemian lands.

== Further development ==
In the 16th century much of the population then adopted the pre-Lutheran Protestant Unity of the Brethren and eventually Lutheranism; the Utraquist Church remained strong in the cities.

The Battle of White Mountain, in 1620, marked the end of the Bohemian Revolt and, led to recatholisation in the Lands of the Bohemian Crown. In 1627, communion under both kinds was again not made available, until the eventual Josephinian Patent of Toleration in 1781.

In modern Catholic practice since the Second Vatican Council, it is determined by each local bishop whether communion is available in one or both kinds in their diocese.

== See also ==
- Altar Wings of Roudníky
- Concomitance (doctrine)

== Bibliography ==
- Ogden, C. K.; Richards, I. A. (1989) [1923]. "Chapter VI: The Theory of Definitions". The Meaning of Meaning. Harcourt Brace Jovanovich. ISBN 0-15-658446-8.
- This article incorporates text from a publication now in the public domain: Hughes, Joseph (1915). "Utraquism". In Herbermann, Charles (ed.). Catholic Encyclopedia. Vol. 15. New York: Robert Appleton Company.
- This article incorporates text from a publication now in the public domain: Wood, James, ed. (1907). "Utraquists". The Nuttall Encyclopædia. London and New York: Frederick Warne.
