= Religious peace of Kutná Hora =

1485 agreement in Bohemia ending the Hussite Wars

Religious peace of Kutná Hora (Czech: Kutnohorský náboženský mír) was concluded in March 1485 by the Czech lands Diet in Kutná Hora between Utraquist Hussites and Roman Catholics. The agreement between representatives of both sides, reached after meeting from 13 March to 20 March, declared the agreement from the Basel Council the basic law of the land. The Utraquist and the Catholic faiths were declared equal in front of the law, and the religious peace (Landfried) was declared for the following 31 years. This agreement finished a long series of religious conflicts in the Czech lands and constituted a definitive end to the Hussite Wars. The Diet in 1512 confirmed the agreement and extended it in perpetuity. Religious peace and tolerance helped for development of the land, but it contributed to the future conflicts of interests between middle-class and nobility.

== See also ==
- Hussites
