= Unity of the Brethren Baptists =

Christian denomination with conservative evangelical theology

Unity of the Brethren Baptists in the Czech Republic Bratrská Jednota Baptistů v České republice
- Classification: Evangelical Christianity
- Theology: Baptist
- Associations: Baptist World Alliance
- Region: Czech Republic
- Headquarters: Prague 3, Czech Republic
- Origin: 1884
- Congregations: 43
- Members: 2,298
- Seminaries: 2
- Official website: bjb.cz

Unity of the Brethren Baptists in the Czech Republic (Czech: Bratrská Jednota Baptistů v České republice), is a Baptist Christian denomination in Czech Republic. It is affiliated with the Baptist World Alliance. The headquarters is in Prague.

== History ==
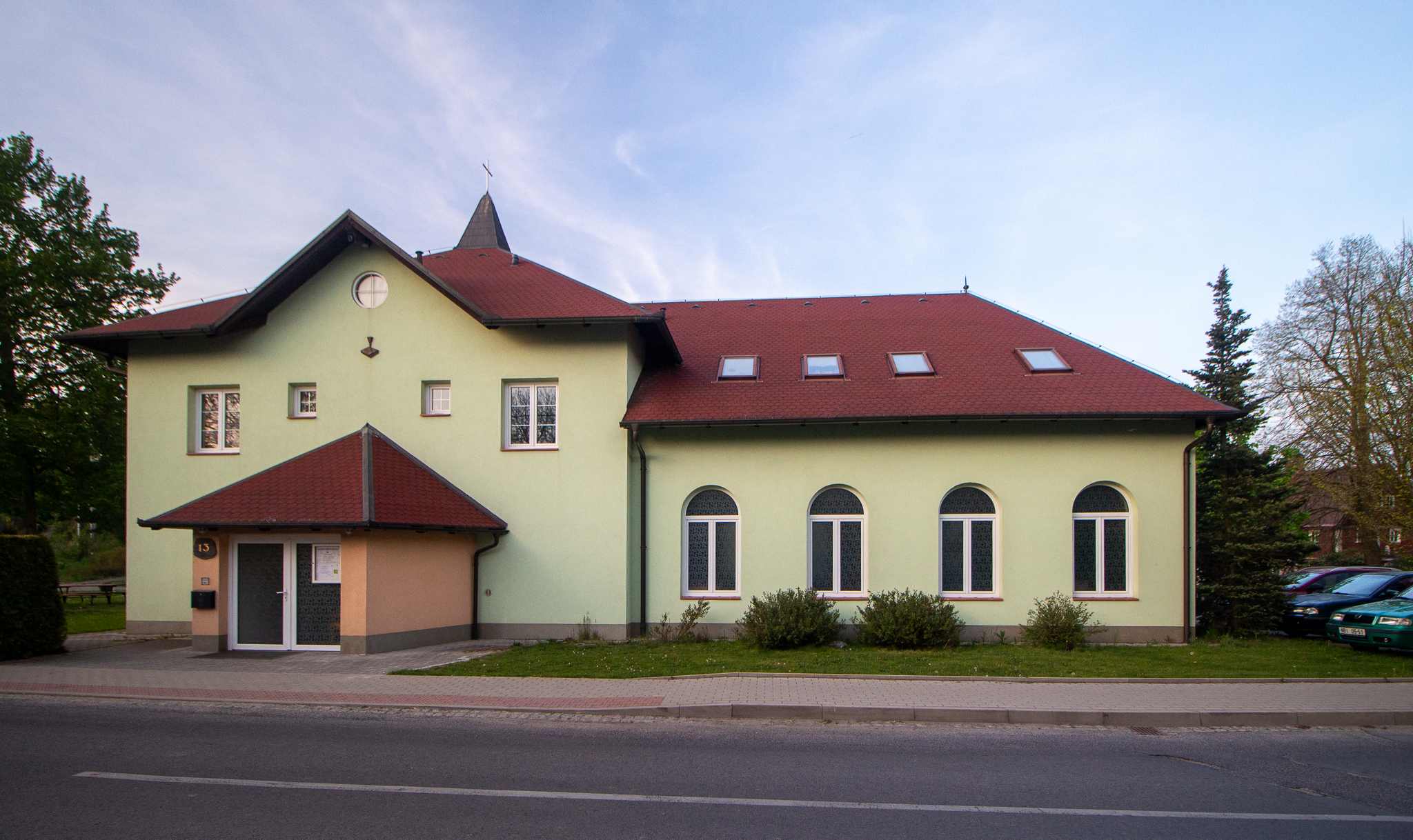
Baptist Church of Brniště.

Baptist work in the territory of the present Czech Republic began in the 1850s. The area was part of Austria-Hungary until the end of World War I, and was known as Czechoslovakia from 1918 until 1992. In 1858 Magnus Knappe, a German minister, began to travel regularly to the Broumov area and preach to the German-speaking people there. The first Czech Baptist congregation was established on March 15, 1884 in the village of Hledsebe in Central Bohemia. This body called itself the Congregation of Christians Baptized in Faith. This work moved to Prague and continued to grow, and other works were established. Meeting in Vavrišovo in 1919, 15 Baptist congregations formed an association with the name The Chelčicky Unity of the Brethren. Later the name The Chelčicky Unity of the Brethren Baptists replaced the original, and in the early 1950s it was changed to The Unity of the Brethren Baptists. Though in the 1960s two regional groups (Bohemian-Moravian and Slovak) were formed, the Unity included all Baptists in the territory of Czechoslovakia until 1993. After Czechoslovakia was split into two republics on January 1, 1993, the Unity of the Brethren Baptists was divided on January 1, 1994, forming the Unity of the Brethren Baptists in the Czech Republic and the Unity of the Brethren Baptists in the Slovak Republic. These two bodies maintain fellowship, use the same hymn book, and publish a common magazine, the Rozsievač (meaning The Sower). In 2019, some churches left the union for theological reasons and founded the Fellowship of Baptist Churches. According to a census published by the association in 2023, it claimed 2,298 members and 43 churches.

== Beliefs ==
The Unity of the Brethren Baptists is a member of the European Baptist Federation, the Baptist World Alliance, and the Ecumenical Council of Churches in the Czech Republic.

The Unity of the Brethren Baptists is a Trinitarian body, holding a belief in one God - the Father, the Son and the Holy Spirit. The highest example, criteria and authority is Jesus. The Scriptures of the Old and the New Testaments are held to be the word of God - God's revelation of Jesus Christ. Salvation comes to persons who exercise faith in Jesus Christ as their Savior, which is prerequisite to becoming church members. Baptism of believers is performed by immersion in water. Since each person is believed to be responsible to God, the Unity of the Brethren Baptists practice and defend liberty of conscience of everyone. Local congregations should be independent and autonomous, but not isolated from other Baptist congregations.

== Governance ==
The highest body in the Unity of the Brethren Baptists is a "convention of delegates", which generally holds sessions once a year. The Convention elects a five-member executive committee for a four-year term, which functions in matters of administration.

== Schools ==
The college or Bible school in Olomouc (founded 1992) offers a three-year study, focusing on theological activities. Those who are interested in specific theological degrees often study at the Evangelic Theological Seminary in Prague.
