= Moravian Burial Ground =

Cemetery in London, England

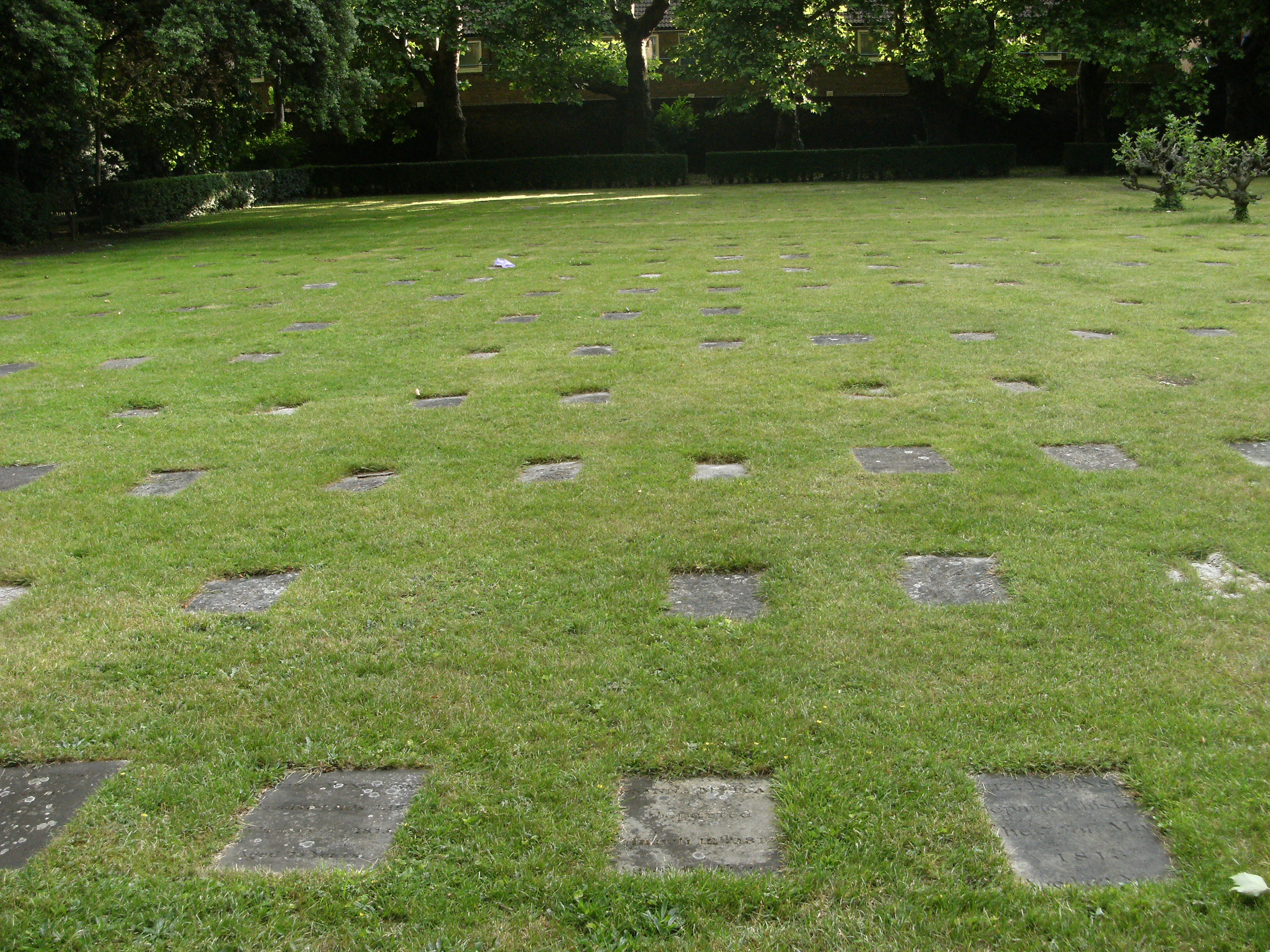
- Moravian Burial Ground behind Lindsey House, Chelsea, London
- Interactive map of Moravian Burial Ground

Details
- Established: 1751
- Location: Millman's Street; London, SW3; United Kingdom
- Country: England
- Coordinates: 51.482477°N 0.175301°W
- Type: access Wednesdays pm
- Owned by: Fetter Lane Society
- No. of interments: 400+

The Moravian Burial Ground is the burial ground of the Moravian Congregation in London.

== Location ==
The Burial Ground is located in the grounds of Lindsey House in the Royal Borough of Kensington and Chelsea, just off Milman's Street near Moravian Place, Cheyne Walk and Beaufort Street.

== History ==
Burials began at the ground in 1751. Some 400 people have been buried there since. The ground was only occasionally used for deep burials. For this reason, it was specifically exempted from the 1855 Act for closing London cemeteries. Interments stopped in 1888, although it may still be used for ashes.

Moravians generally call their burial grounds 'God's Acre'. The Fetter Lane Congregation of the Moravian Church is also known as the Fetter Lane Society. They originally worshipped in Fetter Lane in the City, and then in Lindsey House, but this was sold in the eighteenth century. The Burial Ground was built on the site of the stables to Beaufort House. The replacement church was bombed in the Second World War. The Fetter Lane Moravian Church is now located on the King's Road and maintains the burial ground and chapel in their original location.

== Description ==
The plot enclosed by walls and is divided into four portions, for married and unmarried men and women. It can be visited on Wednesday afternoon.

== Notable burials ==
- Henry, the 73rd Count of Reuss, friend and brother-in-law of Nicolaus Ludwig Zinzendorf
- Peter Böhler, bishop and missionary
- John Cennick, evangelist and hymnwriter
- James Gillray, sexton, father of the caricaturist James Gillray.
- James Hutton, one of the founders of the Fetter Lane Chapel.
- Reverend Benjamin LaTrobe, father of Benjamin Henry Latrobe.
- Christian Renatus, son of Graf Zinzendorf
- Mary Stonehouse was a wealthy Moravian who funded the early church.
