= William Cornelius =

William Cornelius may refer to:

- William Cornelius (cricketer) (1915–2005), Australian cricketer
- Willie Cornelius (1906–1989), American baseball pitcher in the Negro leagues
- Billy Cornelius (1898–?), English professional football player and manager

== See also ==
- William Cornelius Reichel (1824–1876), Moravian author in the United States
- William Cornelius Van Horne (1843–1915), American businessman, industrialist, and railroad magnate
