= Christiansbrunn =

Name of two communities established in Pennsylvania

Coordinates: 40.743°N 75.357°W

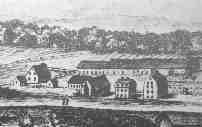
Christiansbrunn, Pennsylvania, as it looked in the 1750s.

Christiansbrunn (Christian's Spring) is the name of two communities established in Pennsylvania.

== Community beginnings ==
A community of Single Brothers was established by the Moravian Unity in the Lehigh Valley of Pennsylvania in 1747. It was based on communal ideals developed by church leader Nicholas Ludwig Zinzendorf. The community was originally named Albrechtsbrunn, the Spring of Albrecht, an early brother. Water power was used to power a grist and saw mill which burned in 1749. Only the saw mill was rebuilt. The spring also supplied water to other industries including a milk house, distillery and brewery. Much of the community's 1,500 acres (6.1 km^{2}) were also farmed and the surplus crops were used to support the Moravians’ vast missionary effort. At its height the community had nearly three hundred cattle and six teams of oxen.

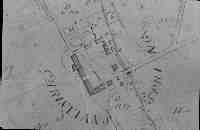
An 1850s map showing the quadrangle of buildings around the public road.

== Named for Moravian spiritual leader ==
The community was renamed Christiansbrunn and formally dedicated on August 4, 1749, in honor of Christian Renatus von Zinzendorf, head of the Single Brothers. He was then living at Herrnhaag in Germany but was expected to come live at the community. Several dozen men who left Herrnhaag due to scandalous events there later settled at Christiansbrunn. They continued the cult of the community's namesake much to the dismay of church leaders in Bethlehem and Christiansbrunn remained a source of embarrassment to the church due to its all-male population.

The elder Zinzendorf was also expected to come to America to live and a manor house for him was constructed at the nearby Moravian community of Nazareth. That building, Nazareth Hall, still exists. Peach trees, Christian Renatus' favorite fruit, were planted so they would bear fruit by the time he arrived. However he died in 1752 in London. A belief among the brothers that Christian Renatus' spirit was in the spring itself was expressed in a poem of the time. Visitors to the site often commented on the tame trout that lived in the spring.

== Center of trades and education ==
In 1757 sixteen boys from Bethlehem were sent to Christiansbrunn to learn trades that including farming, shoe making and writing (for maintaining community records). Silk making was also started, as well as rifle making. Christian Oerter, a noted American gun maker, made long rifles there and is buried in the Moravian Cemetery outside Nazareth. Hemp and flax were processed and woven. Music was also important, both singing and instrumental playing; the community had a trombone choir.

== Community disbanded ==
In 1771, Christiansbrunn was the last Moravian community in the United States to have its communal economy disbanded. The community continued until officially disbanded by the church on April 1, 1796. The remaining farming operations were placed in the hands of family men while "several of the deteriorated bachelors were given a mere asylum there under watchful restraint" in the words of a late nineteenth-century historian who blamed conditions in the community on alcoholism and a "decadence that became hopeless."

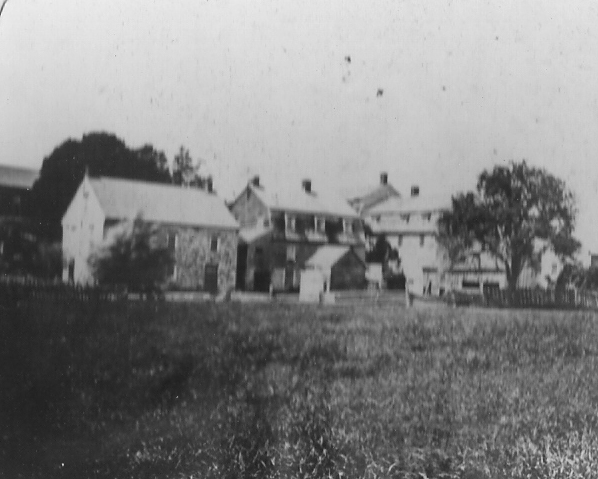
The remaining community buildings as they looked in the late 19th century

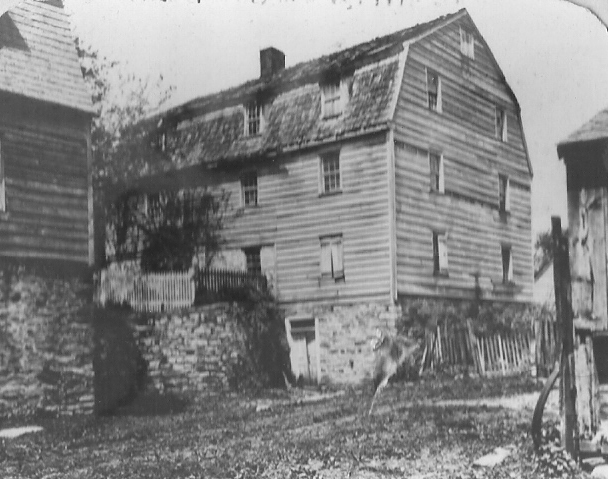
The sacred spring was accessed through the cellar door in the brethren's house.

== Later visits ==
A visitor in 1862 recalled how the community had looked forty years earlier: "The red-tiled roofs, the solid stone masonry of most of the buildings, and the peculiar structure of others, in which the frame is filled in with mortar mixed with cut straw, denoted at once the foreign origin of its founders." The church sold the property in the 1840s when much of its once vast holdings in the Lehigh Valley were dispersed. The remaining buildings were photographed in the 1880s. A visitor in 1914 noted that only a stone house remained of the original settlement and that even the spring was covered by a recent shed. As of January, 2009, those two structures remained. The stone building was the Familienhaus in which lived two married couples who oversaw the community of single brothers.

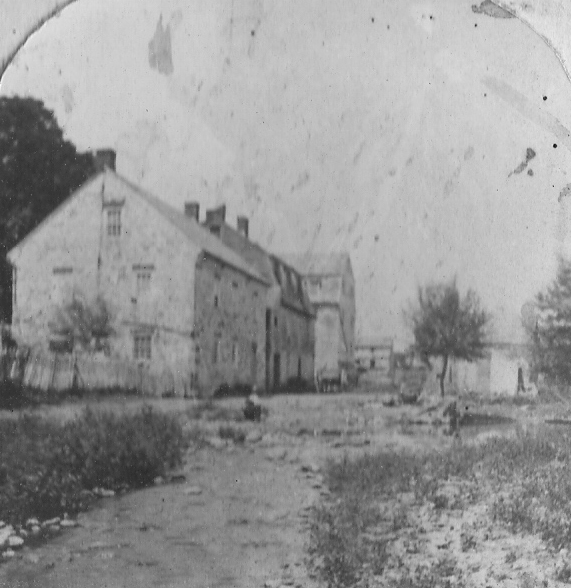
As of 2009, the only remaining building was the stone Familien House to the left.

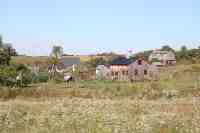
The reorganized spiritual center of Christiansbrunn at its new located in Schuylkill County, Pennsylvania.
