= Christian Renatus von Zinzendorf =

German official of the Moravian Church

Christian Renatus, Count von Zinzendorf und Pottendorf
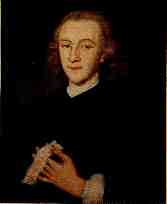
- Christian Renatus von Zinzendorf. The words on the paper he is holding are Gebrochne Augen (Broken eyes), part of a Litany.
- Born: September 19, 1727; Berthelsdorf, Upper Lusatia, Saxony
- Died: May 28, 1752 (aged 24); Dean's Yard, London, United Kingdom
- Occupations: Church official, head of the Single Brethren's Choir of the Moravian Church, spiritual leader
- Spouse: Sidewound of Christ (Note: Beginning in 1748, he called himself Christel von Hölgen, "of the Little Sidewound", indicating he was now the bride of the Sidewound.)
- Parent(s): Nicolas Ludwig, Count von Zinzendorf und Pottendorf and Countess Erdmuthe Dorothea Reuss-Ebersdorf

Imperial Count Christian Renatus von Zinzendorf und Pottendorf (September 19, 1727 – May 28, 1752) was the charismatic leader of the Single Brethren's Choir of the Moravian Church and of Herrnhaag (The Lord’s Grove), a Christian religious community built near Büdingen by his father, Count Nicholas Ludwig, head of the Brüdergemeine or Moravian Unity. Christian Renatus, affectionately known as Christel, took his father’s marriage religion (Ehereligion) literally, proclaiming himself to be the living "Sidewound of Christ" in 1748, which meant he was the embodiment of Christ's sacrificial and compassionate love.

The younger Zinzendorf and his co-elder of the Single Brethren, Joachim Rubusch, also proclaimed themselves to be married to the Sidewound. This derived in part from the teaching of Zinzendorf’s father that all souls are female, regardless of gender, so that they may be married to Christ. This image is derived from the fact that "soul" in German, die Seele, is always a feminine noun.[Cassel's German-English Dictionary, entry die Seele.] It was also in 1748 that Christian Renatus von Zinzendorf declared all Single Brethren to be Sisters and therefore Brides of Christ.

The compounding of sexuality and spirituality at Herrnhaag led to virulent attacks from outside and within the church, threatening to undo the goodwill with other denominations that the elder Zinzendorf had sought for decades. He dismissed his son from his positions and brought him to England for the remaining three years of Christian's life.

After his death, Christian's followers in Pennsylvania named a settlement farm after him. Since there was a flowing spring there it was called "Christiansbrunn", Christian's Spring. while church leaders systematically destroyed most of the documents referring to the events at Herrnhaag. Only within the past two decades has a new generation of scholars and historians begun to reexamine that period to determine what happened.

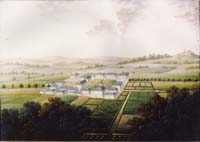
Herrnhaag about the time it was under the leadership of Christian Renatus.

== Birth and formative years ==
Zinzendorf was born just a month after the spiritual awakening experience on August 13, 1727, that signaled the renewal of the Ancient Unity of Brethren, in which Moravian exiles on the lands of his father committed themselves to a life in Christ. Both his parents were deeply committed to this ideal. His father and his mother, née Countess Erdmuthe Dorothea of Reuss-Ebersdorf, came from Pietist families that stressed the indwelling of the spirit. His parents considered their relationship to be a marriage of champions in which the goal was serving Christ. The young Zinzendorf was left in the care of his mother for most of his youth while his father pursued church activities elsewhere. His effeminacy was noted by nineteenth- and early-twentieth-century historians who typically attributed it his being raised in the company of women: "Christian Renatus . . . had all the ardor without the virility characteristic of his father."

The strong mother/weak or distant father parenting style typically associated with early psychoanalytic attempts to explain homosexuality was also used to further discredit Zinzendorf. As a student, Zinzendorf was known for being frivolous, even bringing a cat to class. At the age of sixteen, he was named vice-elder of the Single Brothers Choir. Moravian communities were dedicated to serving Christ. The traditional family unit was abandoned in order to direct all residents' energies to that goal. Much like the Shakers, Moravian residents lived in groups or choirs according to gender, marital status and age.

== Christel as Christ's representative ==
Many of Zinzendorf's beliefs and acts were based upon his father's words: "I live no more; he lives in me. I speak no more; he speaks in me. When you speak with me, you speak with him. When you have love for me, so too you have love for him, and when you hate me, so too you hate him, and when you have a word from me, so too you have it from him." Seeing Christ in Christian's eyes is a theme from the period in poetry, painting and engraving. An engraving complete with his portrait states that one can see the departed Christ by looking at Christel's forehead, meaning his eyes. A portrait of him now in the Moravian Archives in Herrnhut, Germany, includes the words Gebrochne Augen (broken eyes), again referring to seeing Christ at the moment of death in Christian's eyes, or at the moment of his completed sacrifice.

The idea of Christ living in another was not uncommon in the seventeenth and eighteenth centuries. It is a fundamental belief shared with the Quakers and Shakers, who also had roots in Pietism and the indwelling of Christ.

== Leadership and loss of leadership ==
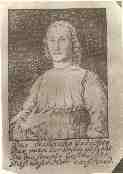
Mid-18th-century engraving with the (translated) words "The lovely poem/which one can see from his forehead/is the simple story/that our lord departed."

Herrnhaag was a community designed by the elder Zinzendorf, whose inhabitants were to live under the direct rule of Christ with Christian Renatus as his representative. At Herrnhaag, Christel was the link between the spiritual and the earthly as the spirit took human form. During the 1748 Single Brothers Festival at Herrnhaag, Christel and his assistants entered wearing white robes, implying it was Christ who was actually entering. Later that day, Christel and twelve assistants led Communion, further representing Christ and the apostles. During the service, those in attendance believed that the Sidewound of Christ was literally standing before them in the bodily forms of Christel and Rubusch, his co-leader of the brothers. Christel sang a welcoming hymn for Christ entering the hall, and while kissing, the brothers believed they were literally kissing the Sidewound.

The combination of sexuality and spirituality shown at Herrnhaag was not unknown in Christian history, but it caused increasing scandal both within and without the church, particularly embarrassing for Nicholas, "who was trying to be recognized as a rightful theologian after joining the confession of Augsburg" in 1748. Even Christel’s mother was concerned, realizing the events taking place at Herrnhaag and its nearby sister community of Marienborn were at the edge where metaphor and reality meet. Referring to a plowshare that can be raised and lowered, she later wrote to her son that "I sometimes said we have already put the peg in the last hole. If we wanted to remain in the world, the Savior would have to make three or four holes further back and lower down."

In addition to increasingly embarrassing scandal and rumor, the cost of sustaining Herrnhaag and its numerous festivals put a severe financial strain on the church at a time when its missionary efforts were expanding around the world. Events reached such a point that Christel’s father denounced what was happening at Herrnhaag and ordered Christel to attend him in England. "When the twenty-two-year-old returned to Herrnhaag, he was physically and mentally broken. In August 1750 he founded a Bund auf die Marter Gottes (Covenant on the ordeal of God). During this 'phase of consolation' ordered by his father, he also composed several 'purified' poems."

== Death and apotheosis ==
Zinzendorf died in a house in Dean's Yard of Westminster Abbey, London, on May 28, 1752, from a hemorrhage due to tuberculosis, with John Nitschmann, his former tutor, beside him. He was buried on the grounds of Lindsey House, "Sharon," the Moravian Graveyard located in Chelsea outside London, where his father lived at that time while directing the worldwide missionary effort of the church.

When the Moravian Brethren and Sisters refused to forswear their allegiance to the elder Zinzendorf and sever their connection to the Moravian Church in the 1750s at the insistence of Gustav Friedrich, Count of Isenburg-Büdingen, Herrnhaag was closed and a great number of Moravians came to Bethlehem and Nazareth in Pennsylvania. A farming community had already been established near Nazareth for the Single Brethren named Christiansbrunn, Christian's Spring. One of the brothers wrote a poem stating that Christel lived again in the Congregation at the spring and that the flowing waters restored him “more and more.”

== Historical perspective ==
For more than 200 years after his death, Christel was looked upon as a failure by Moravian historians and scholars, who saw him as weak, effeminate, ineffectual and a grave disappointment to his father whose trust he had betrayed. The only way most Moravians of the nineteenth and twentieth centuries knew him was by the inclusion of several of his hymns in various Moravian hymnals, the most famous being “My Redeemer, overwhelmed with anguish, went to Olivet for me.”

Indeed, the entire period (approximately 1747-1749) became known as the "Sifting Time" from Luke 22:31: "Simon, Simon, behold, Satan has desired to have you that he may sift you as wheat." Nicholas Zinzendorf called the ensuing scandal an “unbridled freedom of the flesh.” His representative told the residents at Herrnhaag and its nearby sister community of Marienborn that it was impossible to be "truly unified with our Husband" while living on earth. He further added that the residents had mistaken metaphor for reality and wrongly believed that the brothers were actually sisters.

Historians for the next two hundred years accepted this view of events and wrote off what happened as a time of embarrassing excess from which the church was saved only by the timely intervention of Nicholas.

Determining exactly what happened was made exceedingly difficult due to extensive destruction of documents amounting to official censorship that began in the eighteenth century by church officials and even archivists. There was a general shunning of the period that lasted well into the twentieth century, and almost no pertinent documents remains in either the major Moravian archives in Bethlehem, Pennsylvania or Herrnhut, Germany.

A new generation of scholars and historians interested in determining exactly what happened have been able to locate documents in private collections and other sources. An indication of renewed interest in Christian Renatus and what he meant to his time was shown in September, 2008 when a birthday festival was held in his honor in Bethlehem, Pennsylvania based on eighteenth-century sources and sponsored by the Historic Bethlehem Partnership, the Moravian Music Foundation and the Moravian Archives.
