= Fetter Lane Society =

Church in London, England

Coordinates: 51°29′01″N 0°10′34″W

The Fetter Lane Society was the first flowering of the Moravian Church in Britain, and an important precursor to Methodism. It was founded in 1738. Although the original meeting house was destroyed in the mid-twentieth century, the society still meets in London, and is part of the British Province of the Moravian Church.

== History ==
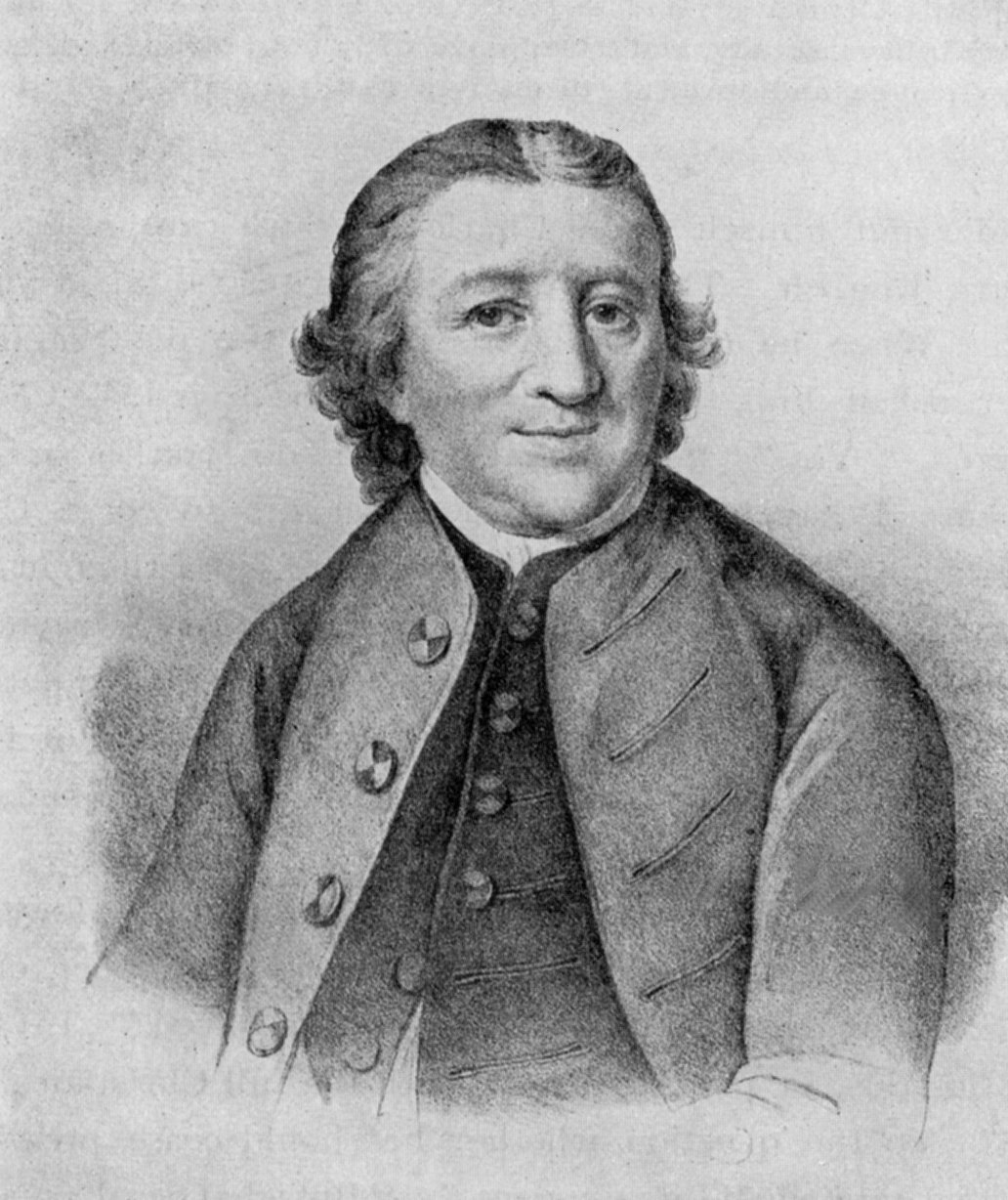
Peter Boehler

A short time before the Methodist revival of the eighteenth century in England, Moravians were ministering in London. German-born Peter Boehler, the London Moravian leader, and his followers established the Fetter Lane Society in May 1738 for the purpose of discipleship and accountability. They began with the purpose of meeting once a week for prayer and fellowship. Most of their members were Anglicans, most prominently John Wesley, Charles Wesley, and George Whitefield. John Wesley records in his journal for 1 January 1739:

"Mr. Hall, Hinching, Ingham, Whitefield, Hutching, and my brother Charles were present at our love feast in Fetter Lane with about 60 of our brethren. About three in the morning, as we were continuing instant in prayer, the power of God came mightily upon us insomuch that many cried out for exceeding joy and many fell to the ground. As soon as we were recovered a little from that awe and amazement at the presence of His majesty, we broke out with one voice, 'We praise Thee, O God, we acknowledge Thee to be the Lord.'".

The Moravians in London believed that full assurance was tied to salvation. They didn't believe in degrees of faith, but rather a complete faith, clothed in confident assurance, unfettered by sin, fear, and doubt. Fear and doubt for the Moravians indicated a lack of faith, and pointed to a need for salvation.

== John Wesley ==
John Wesley had a radical conversion experience at a meeting house at Aldersgate Street on 24 May 1738, after hearing a reading of Martin Luther’s preface to the book of Romans. Wesley, however, would come to disagree with the London Moravian insistence that justification had to be accompanied by instantaneous full assurance and that the means of grace had to be withheld from those who did not have that full assurance.

Regarding this issue, he collided with Philip Henry Molther and other Moravians at the Fetter Lane Society in 1739–1740. Molther told participants they had to abstain from doing good works and partaking in communion until they had full assurance. Molther insisted the way to acquire faith was to wait upon God and not employ any means of grace, such as worship, prayer, partaking communion or even good works because the fruits of the Spirit could not be bestowed upon those who did not have it.

After challenging these assertions in two messages in June 1740, Wesley was no longer welcome at the Fetter Lane Society. Along with about 50 others, he formed the Foundery Society, in a former cannon foundery at Moorfields whose lease he had purchased in November 1739. The Fetter Lane Society, however, had helped serve as an inspirational model to future societies that would help establish the Methodist Church.

== Leadership ==
A prominent leader of worship in the mid-eighteenth century was Count Nicolaus Ludwig von Zinzendorf, and the parents of William Blake also attended (it has been suggested that Moravian hymns were an influence on Blake's Songs of Innocence and Experience). The Swedish scientist and mystic Emanuel Swedenborg was also a visitor from 1744 to 1745 and again in 1748–9.

== Place of worship ==
Although its original historic building was destroyed by Nazi bombing in World War II, the Fetter Lane Moravian Congregation continues to worship in the metropolis. Although Lindsey House in Cheyne Walk was sold in the eighteenth century, the Congregation has retained and still uses the carriage house between Beaufort Street and Millman's Street. This now contains dwellings and a chapel situated at the northern edge of the characteristic Moravian Burial Ground, God's Acre.
