= Mary Stonehouse =

Deaconess of the Moravian church

- Born: Mary Crispe; 14 February 1722; Islington
- Died: 10 December 1751 (aged 29); London
- Other names: Maria Theresa
- Occupation: Deaconess
- Known for: supporting the Moravian Church
- Spouse: George Stonehouse
- Parent: adopted by Count Zinzendorf

Mary Stonehouse (also known as Maria Theresa Stonehouse, born Mary Crispe; 14 February 1722 – 10 December 1751) was a British heiress who was a worker, supporter, and deaconess of the Moravian Church. She was adopted as an adult by the church's founder who named her Maria Theresa after his deceased daughter.

== Life ==
Stonehouse was born on 14 February 1722 in Islington. Her mother was Elizabeth (born Sayer) and her father, John Crispe, was the 3rd of the Crispe baronets, of Hammersmith.

In 1739 she married George Stonehouse who had been a Church of England minister. He had been the vicar of Islington who had employed Charles Wesley as his de facto curate. His family owned the rights to appoint vicars in Islington, and the year following his marriage he resigned as vicar and sold the rights to appoint his replacements.

In 1742 she joined the Moravians and worked in Yorkshire before she first moved to Germany in 1743. She was known within the church as Sister Stonehouse or Maria Theresa Stonehouse.

Her role within the Moravians grew. In Germany, she was an eldress of the Married Sisters in Herrnhaag. In 1745 she returned to London where she became an eldress from November 1746. In 1748 she visited Germany again and she became a deaconess in September 1749 in London. She was still close to Zinzendorf and in the following year she was working in his home.

== Death and legacy ==
Stonehouse died in London on 10 December 1751 following childbirth. She had eight children but they all died as children. She was buried in the Moravian burial ground and in the chapel, there is a memorial plaque that mentions her father and husband. Her husband remarried. John Wesley noted that he was different and he put this down to his wealth. Stonehouse left her wealth to her husband but only during his lifetime, after he died, it was to go to the Moravian church.
