= James Hutton (minister) =

English Royal Navy admiral

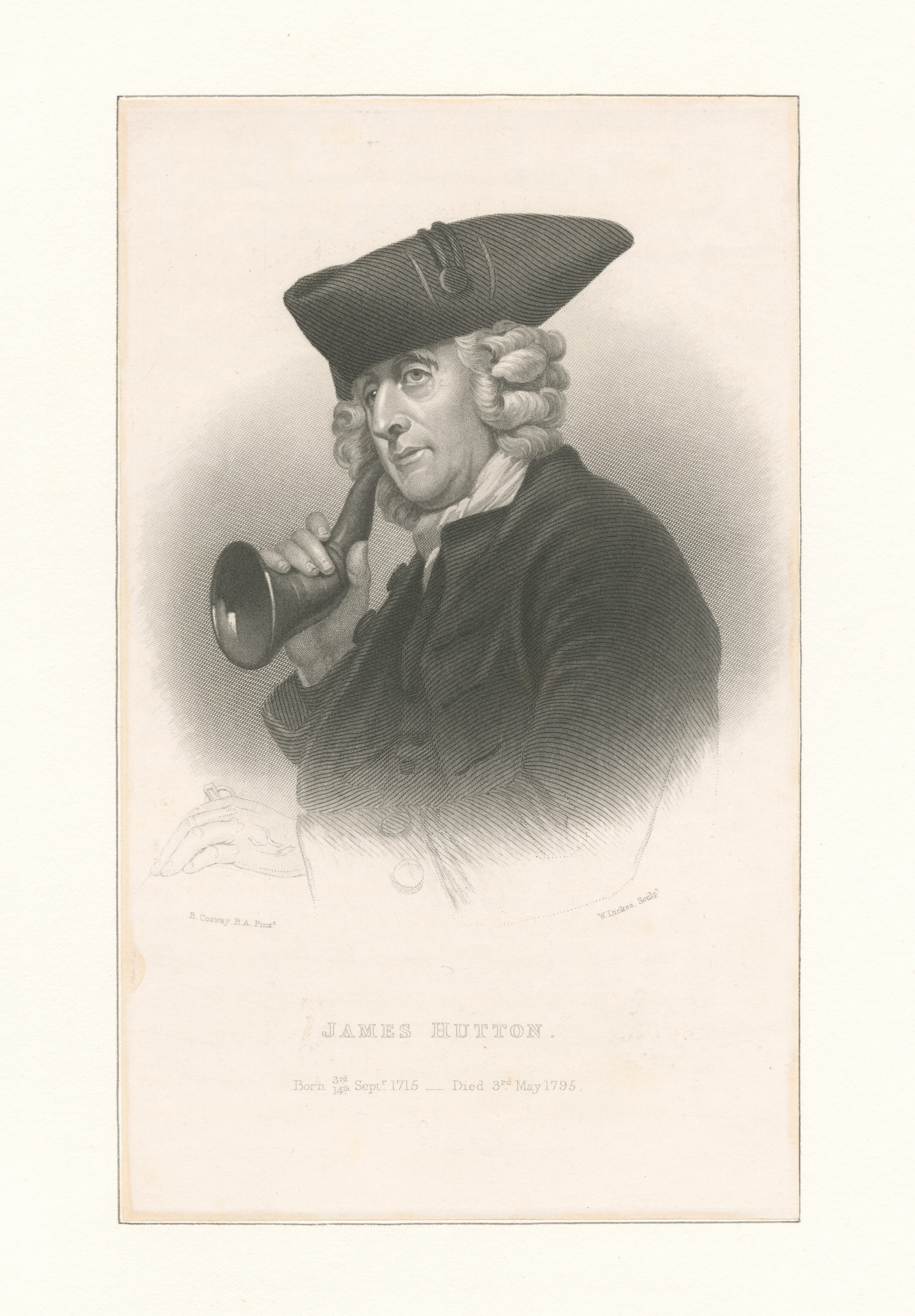
- Born: 3 September 1715; London
- Died: 3 May 1795 (aged 79)
- Occupations: Moravian minister and bookseller

James Hutton (3 September 1715 – 3 May 1795) was an English Moravian minister and bookseller.

== Biography ==
Hutton the son of the Rev. John Hutton by Elizabeth Ayscough. He was born in London on 3 September 1715. The father, a nonjuring clergyman who had resigned his living, resided in College Street, Westminster, where he took Westminster boys to board. He was a friend of Dr. Burney. James Hutton was educated at Westminster, and was apprenticed to Mr. Innys, a bookseller of St. Paul's Churchyard. About 1736 he opened a bookshop of his own at the Bible and Sun, west of Temple Bar. But he never paid much attention to business. Before the end of his apprenticeship he had met the Wesleys at Oxford, and when they left for Georgia in 1735 he accompanied 'them to Gravesend; in 1738 and 1739 he published Whitefield's 'Journal.' In London Hutton soon started a small society for prayer, and corresponded with many Methodists; his mother remained a strong churchwoman, and wrote to Samuel Wesley, who was not of his brother's way of thinking, that John Wesley was her son's pope. But Hutton had in 1737 been introduced by John Wesley to Peter Bohler and two other Moravian brethren then on their way to Georgia, and thenceforth he inclined to Moravianism. In 1739 he set out for Germany, where he visited the Moravian congregations, and began a correspondence with Nicolaus Zinzendorf. When John Wesley was separating himself from the Moravians, he made a vain attempt in 1739 to induce Hutton to follow his example, and in 1740, after Wesley had induced several members of Hutton's society, which met then at the Fetter Lane Chapel, to abandon it for his Foundry Society, the disruption between Hutton and himself was complete. They were subsequently reconciled, and Wesley noted in his ‘Journal' after Hutton had paid him a visit that he believed Hutton would be saved, but as by fire.

Hutton was till his death an active Moravian leader. He often visited Germany, and in 1741 became, by August Gottlieb Spangenberg's advice, one of the founders of the Society for the Furtherance of the Gospel, and acted as 'referendary' for many years. 'Pray,’ Lord Shelburne asked him, in the course of an interview in which the projected Moravian mission to Labrador was discussed, 'on what footing are you with the Methodists? 'They kick us whenever they can,' answered Hutton. George III, the queen, and Benjamin Franklin were among Hutton's acquaintances. On 3 May 1795 Hutton died at Oxted Cottage, near Godstone, Surrey, where he had lived for nearly two years with the Misses Biscoe and Shelley. He was buried in the burying-ground adjoining the chapel at Chelsea. Hutton married at Marrenborn, 3 July 1740, Louise Brandt, a Swiss Moravian, whose grandfather had been advocate of Neuchatel, Zinzendorf performing the ceremony. He left no family. His wife seems to have lapsed occasionally, as on 4 November 1771 'a letter from Brother Hutton, apologising for the uncongregation-like fashion of his wife's gown, was read.' Hutton may be called the founder of the Moravian church in England, although Cominius and other teachers had visited this country before, A portrait of Hutton, with his ear-trumpet, by Richard Cosway, was engraved in mezzotint by John Raphael Smith in 1786; another engraving by W. Wickes is prefixed to Benham's 'Memoir.' Hutton wrote ' An Essay towards giving some just ideas of the Personal Character of Count Zinzendorf ...,' London, 1755, 8vo.
