= Nazareth Hall Tract =

- U.S. National Register of Historic Places
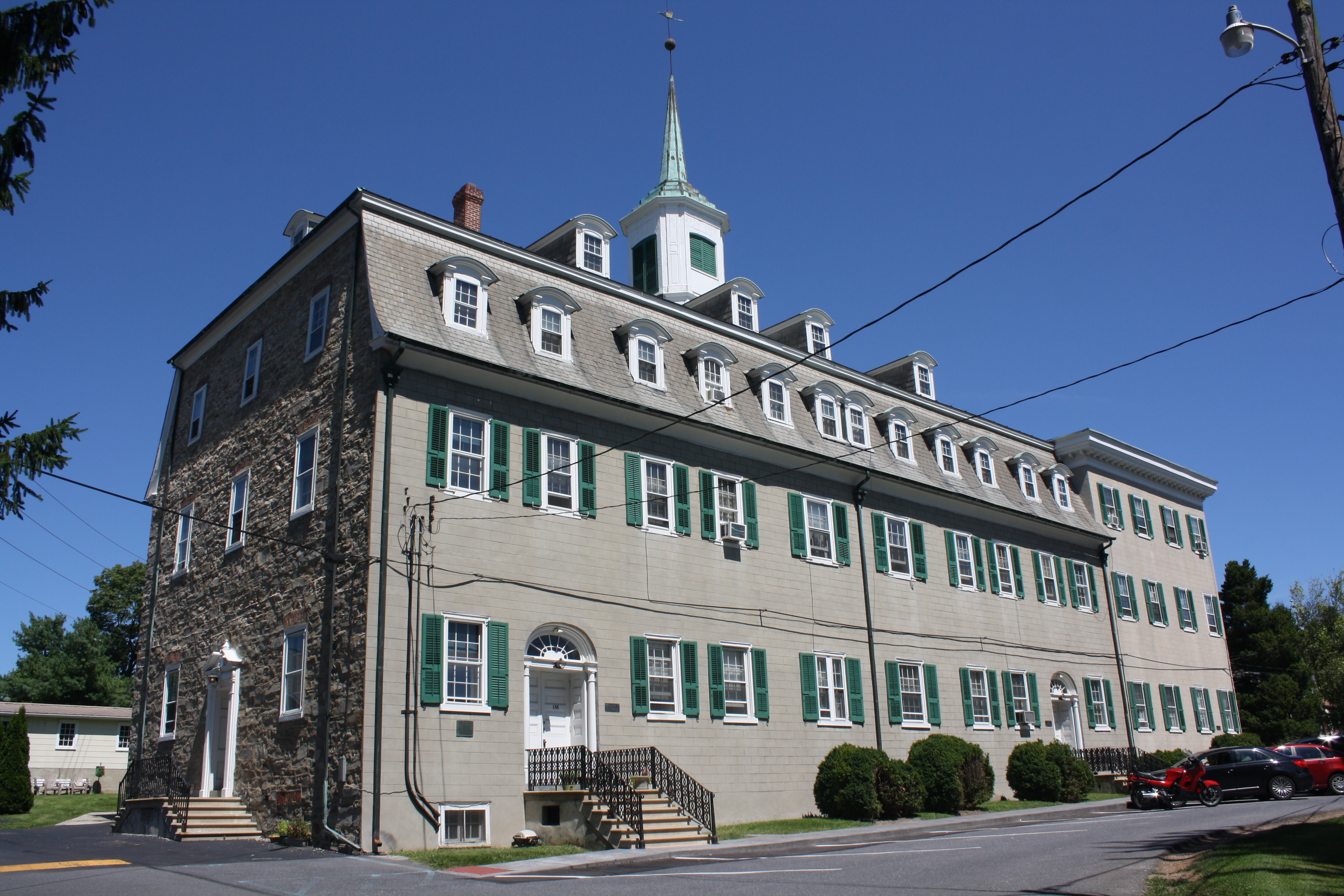
- Nazareth Hall, August 2013.

- Location within Pennsylvania Location within the United States
- Location: Zizendorf Square, Nazareth, Pennsylvania
- Coordinates: 40°44′36.3″N 75°18′49.0″W
- Area: 16.3 acres (6.6 ha)
- Built: 1756
- Built by: Tobias Hirt, Carl Schulze
- NRHP reference No.: 80003588
- Added to NRHP: November 28, 1980

Nazareth Hall Tract is a historic Moravian school complex located at Nazareth, Northampton County, Pennsylvania. It consists of the manor house Nazareth Hall, the 1840 Moravian Church, the "First Room" Building (Parsonage), the Principal's House, the Single Sister's House, and a monument. In 1759, it became the central boarding school for sons of Moravian parents known as Nazareth Hall. The school closed in 1928–1929.

Nazareth Hall is a colonial mansion built in 1756, and is a solid masonry building with a gambrel roof measuring 100 feet (30 m) long and 46 feet (14 m) deep. The 1840 Moravian Church is a 2-1/2-story stucco coated stone building with a gable roof. The Parsonage was built in the 1870s and is a three-story brick structure. The original section of the "First Room" Building was built in 1850, with additions and modifications made in 1855, 1875, and the 1920s. The Principal's House is a two-story building built in 1819, with additions and modifications made in the 1870s and in 1910. The Single Sister's House was built in 1784, and is a three-story building with a single pitched roof. It was converted for school use in 1874–1875.

It was added to the National Register of Historic Places in 1980.

== Gallery ==
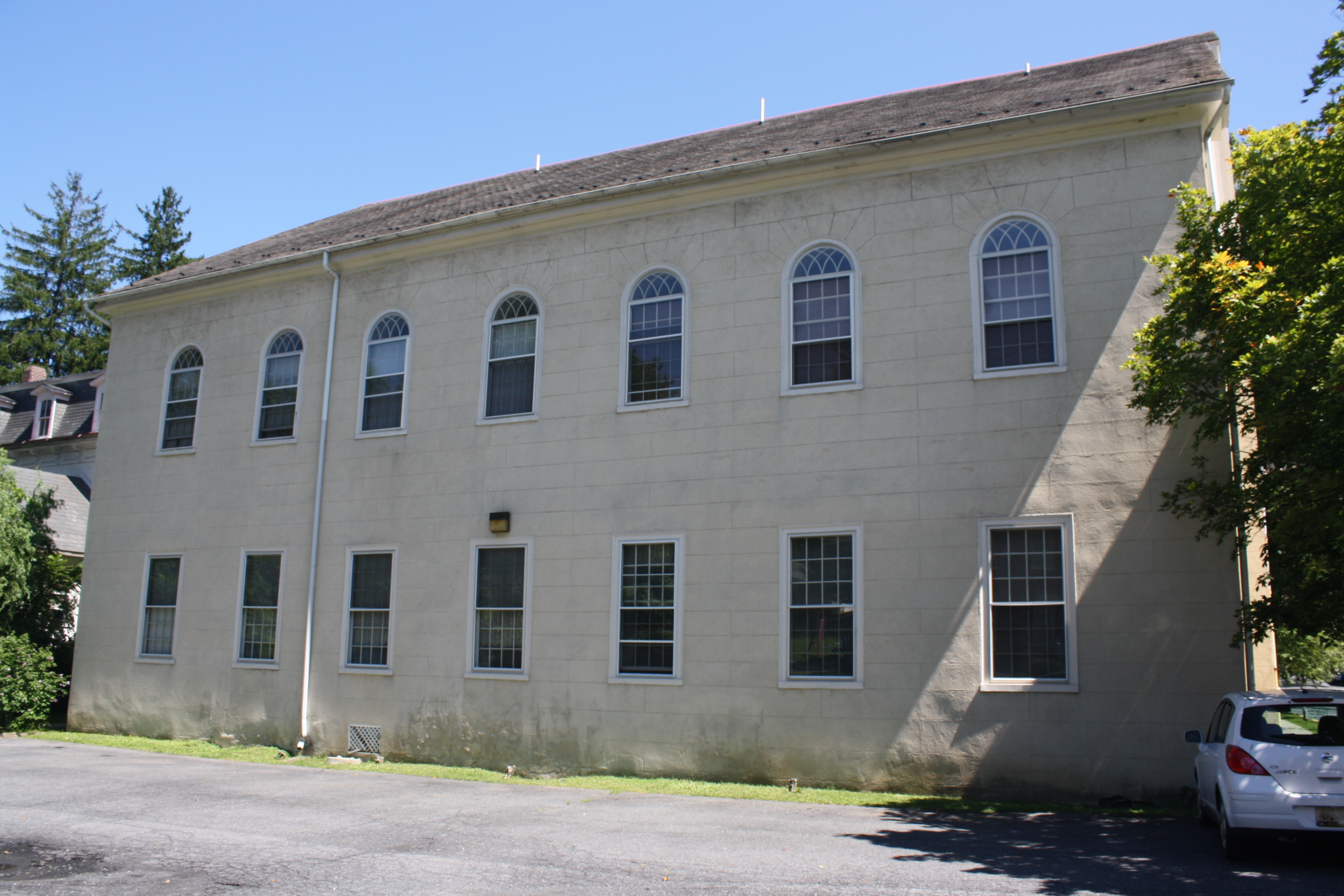
Former Moravian Church

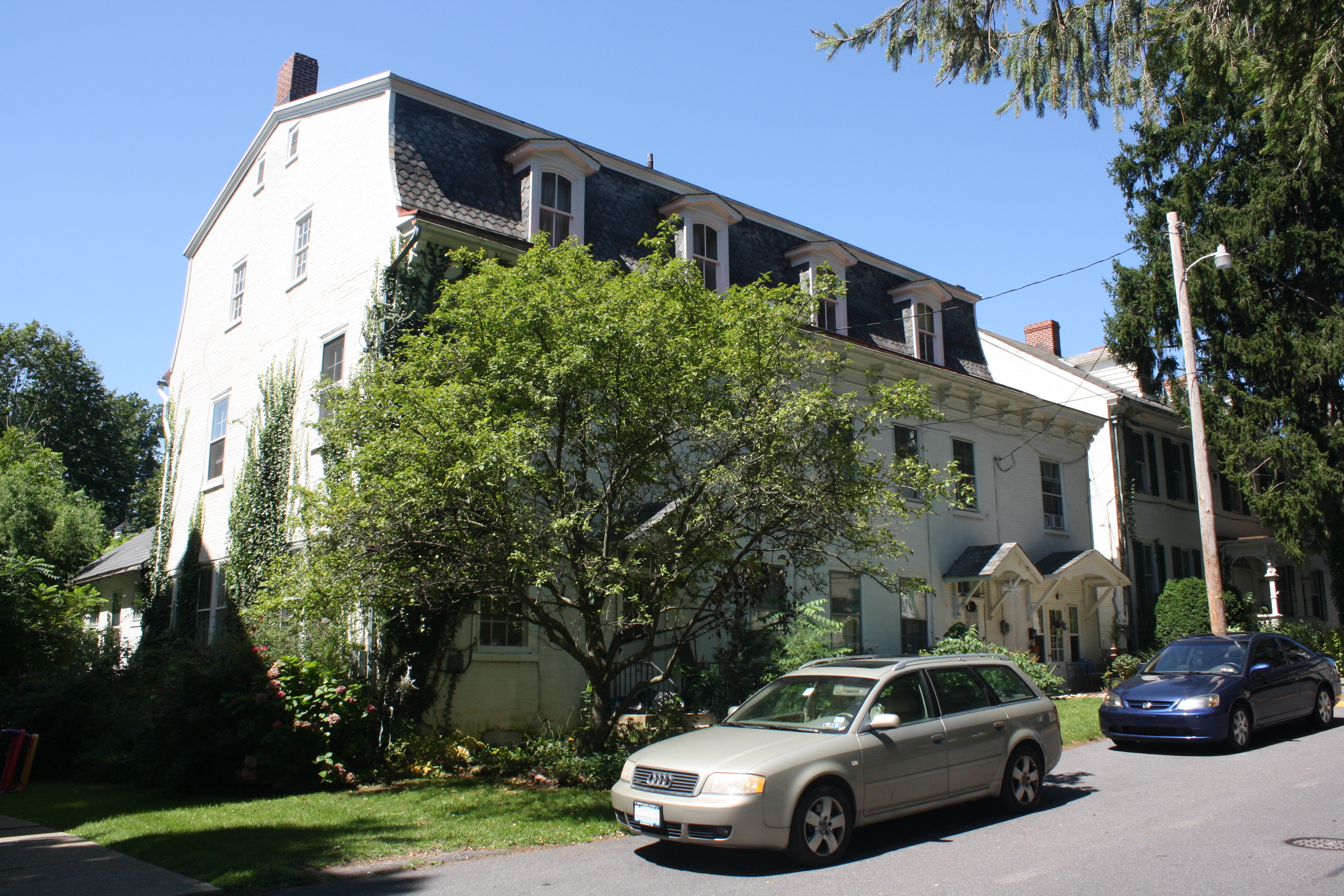
Parsonage, "First Room Building"

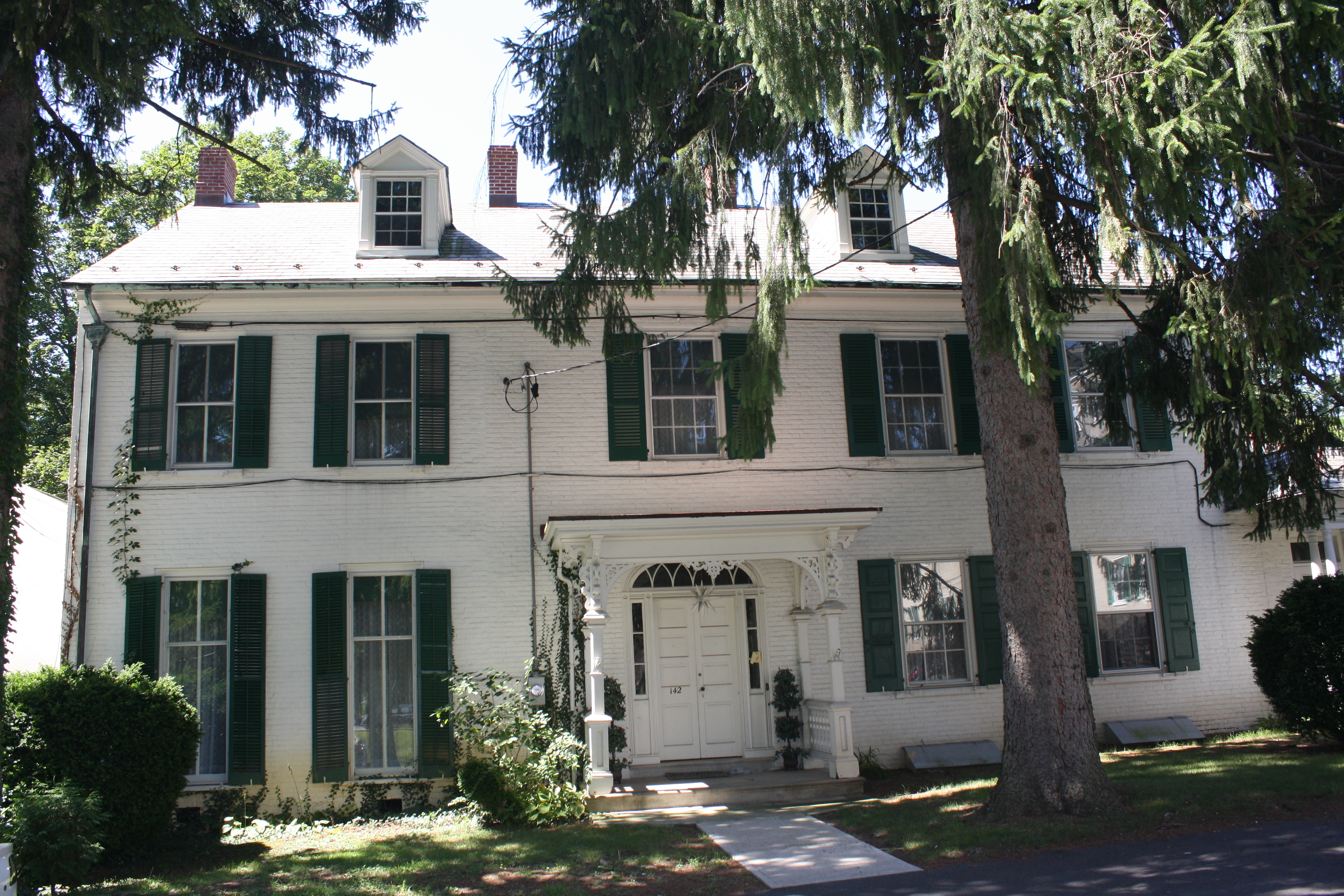
Principal's House

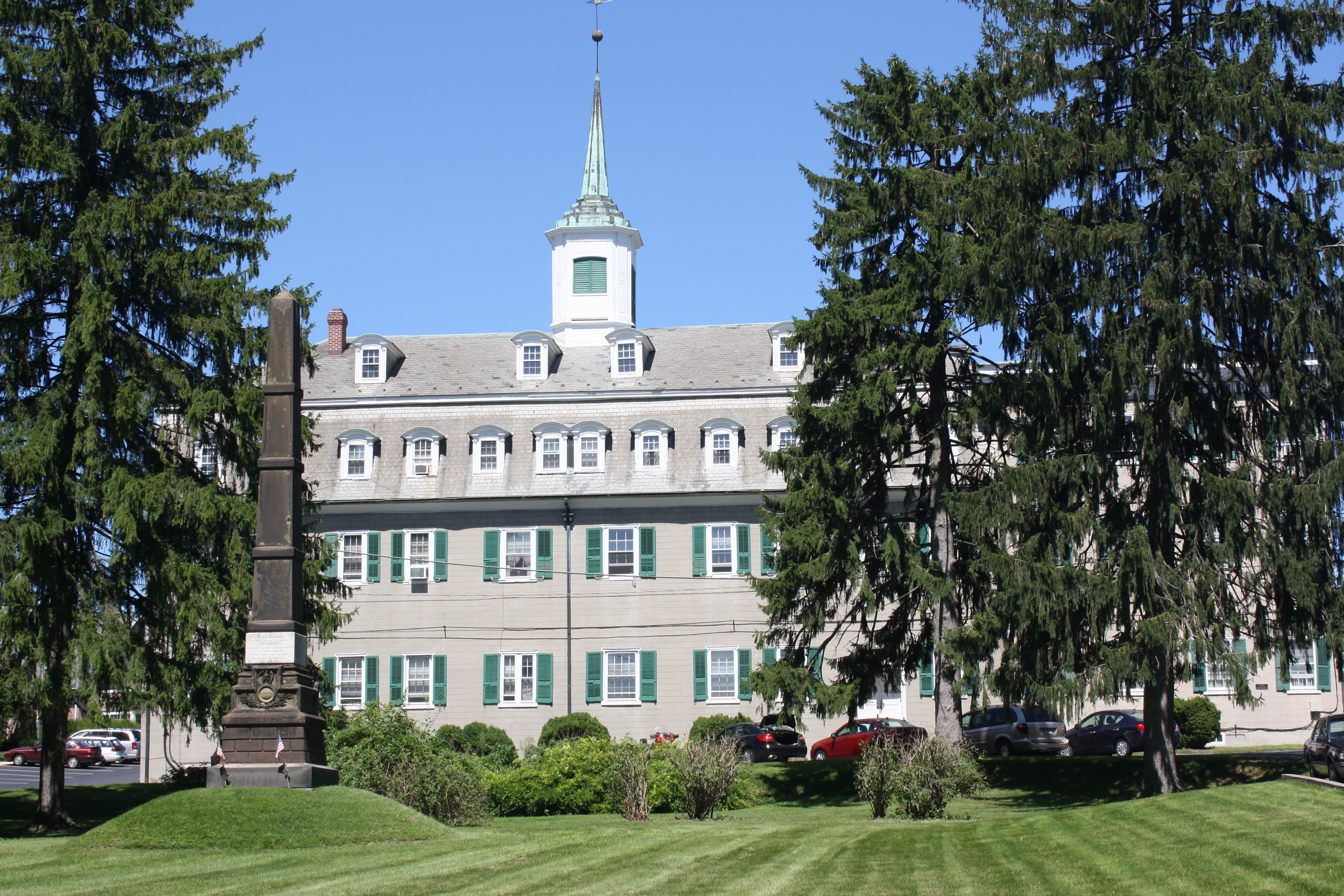
Nazareth Hall

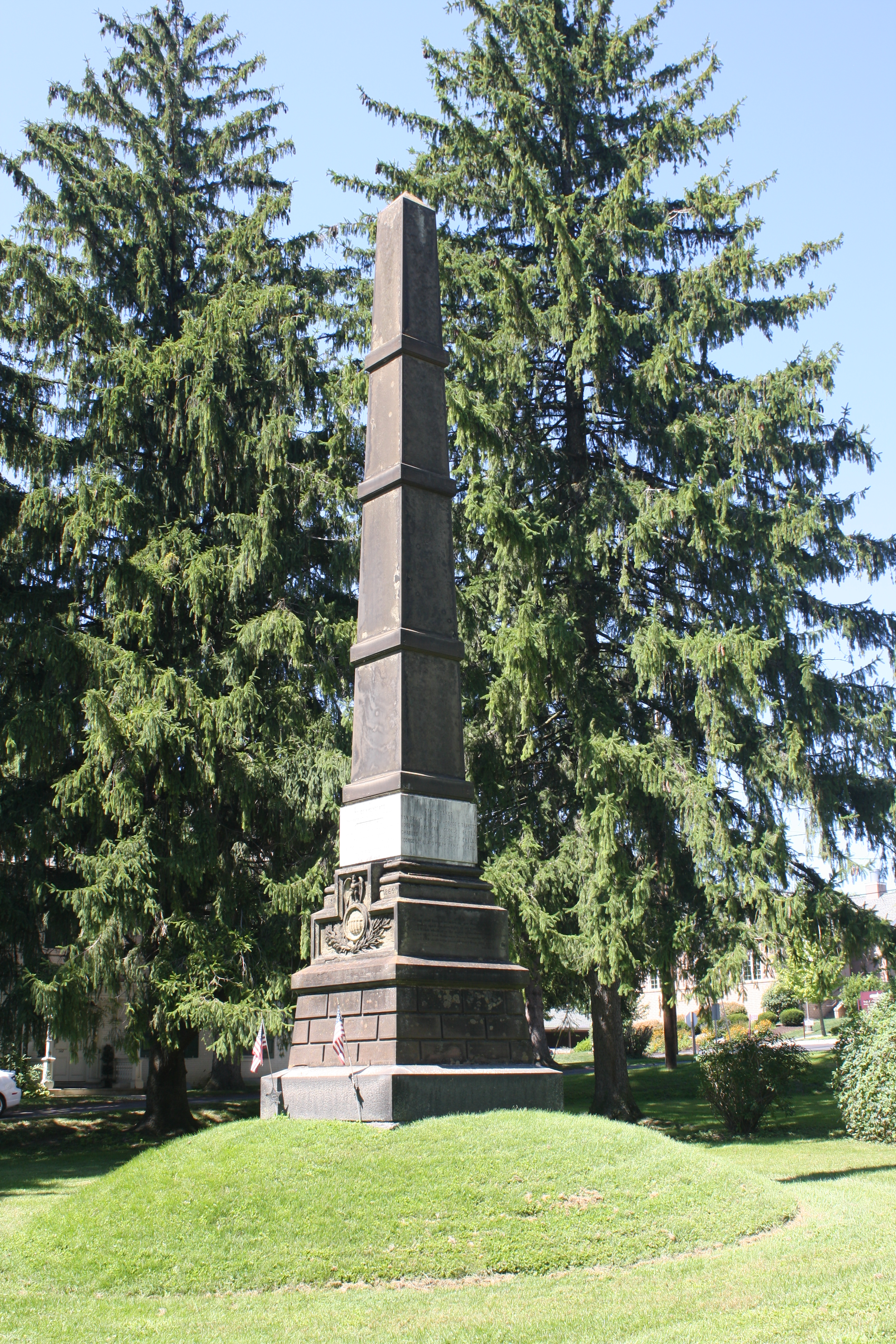
Civil War Monument

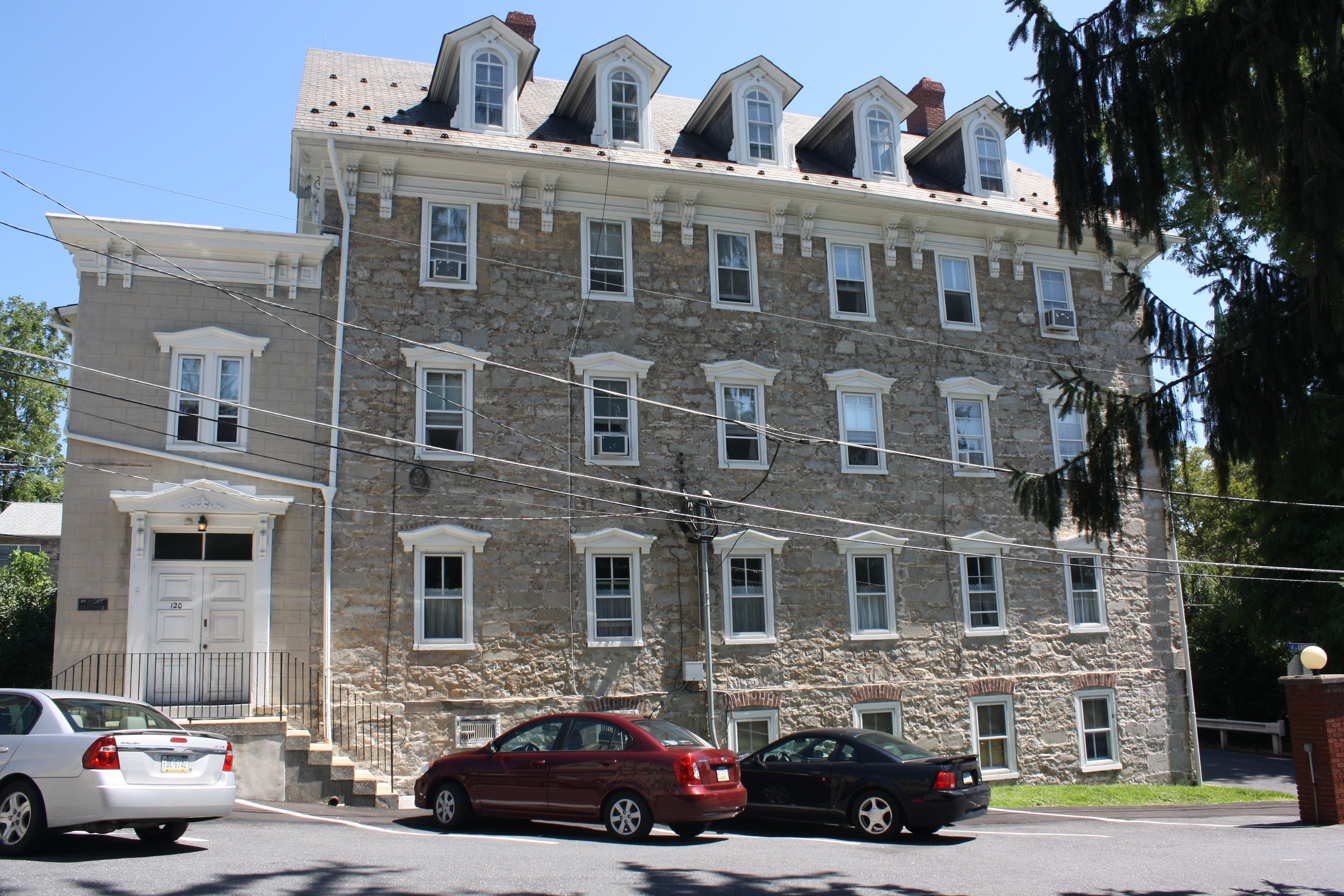
Single Sister's House

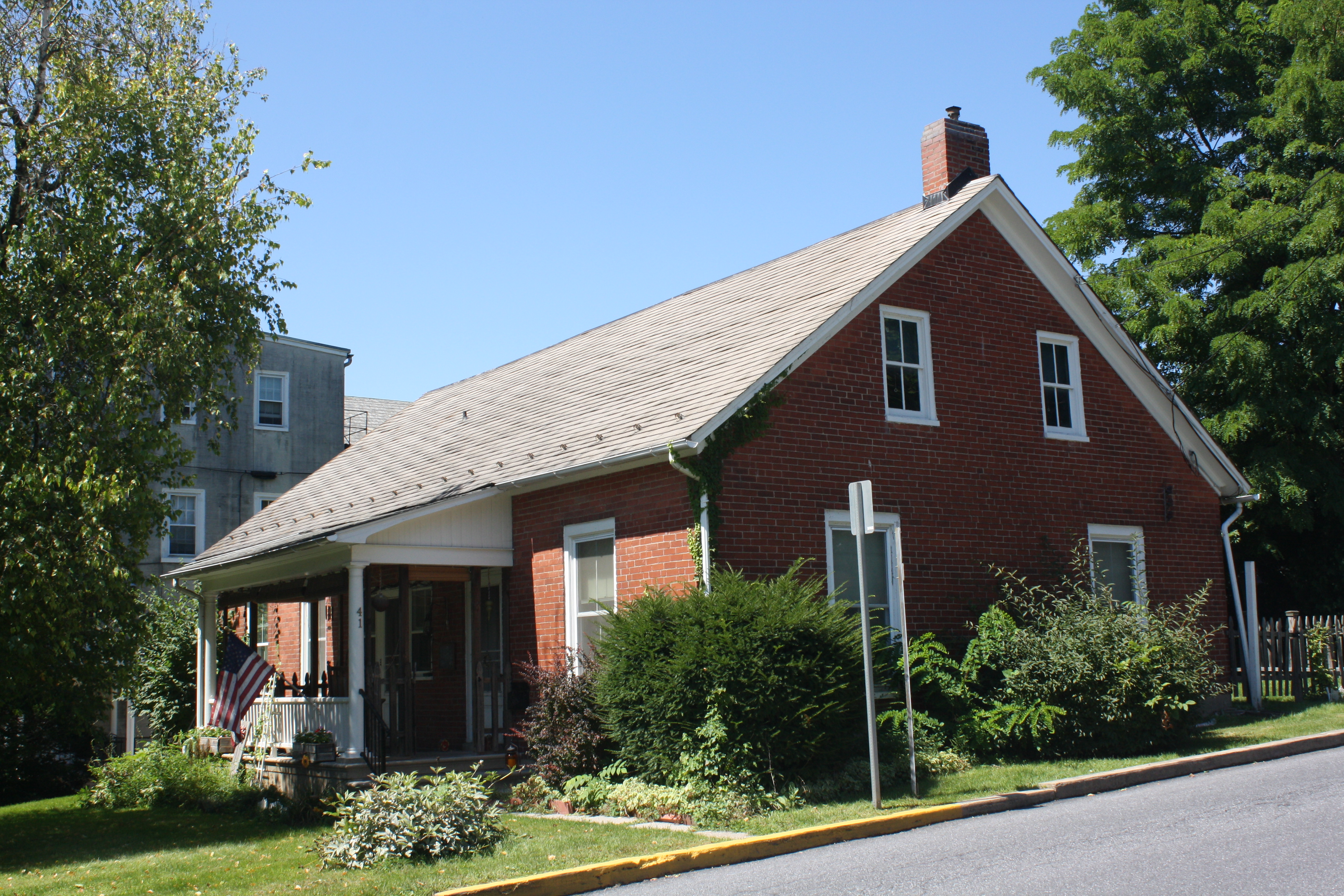
Landry building

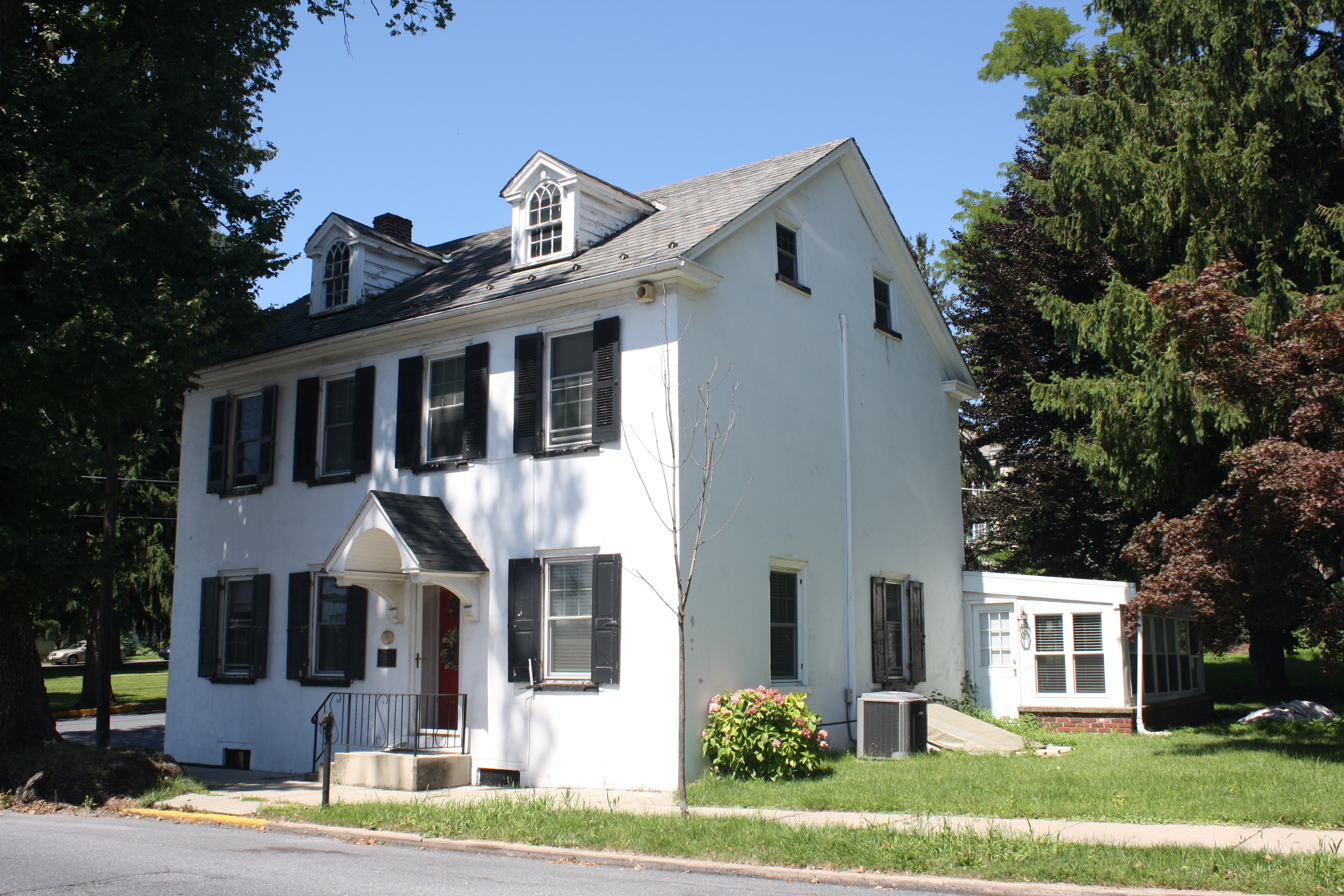
Schenk House
