= William Cornelius (cricketer) =

Australian cricketer (1915–2005)

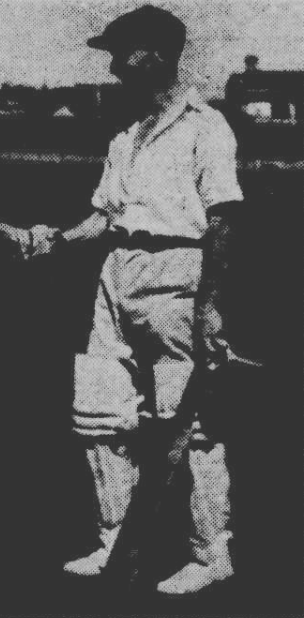

Personal information
- Born: 17 February 1915; Melbourne, Australia
- Died: 26 June 2005 (aged 90)

Domestic team information
- Years: Team
- 1933: Victoria
- Source: Cricinfo, 22 November 2015

William Cornelius (17 February 1915 – 26 June 2005) was an Australian cricketer who played one first-class cricket match for Victoria in 1933. He was a batsman who favored the on-side and a talented fielder.

Cornelius began playing district cricket for South Melbourne in 1932 while he was still captaining the University High School side, and he captained the club in the 1940s while Lindsay Hassett and Ian Lee were on military service. Overall he scored 3863 runs at an average of 34.2 for South Melbourne before retiring in 1945.

== See also ==
- List of Victoria first-class cricketers
