= Herrnhaag =

Coordinates: 50.2631°N 9.08278°E

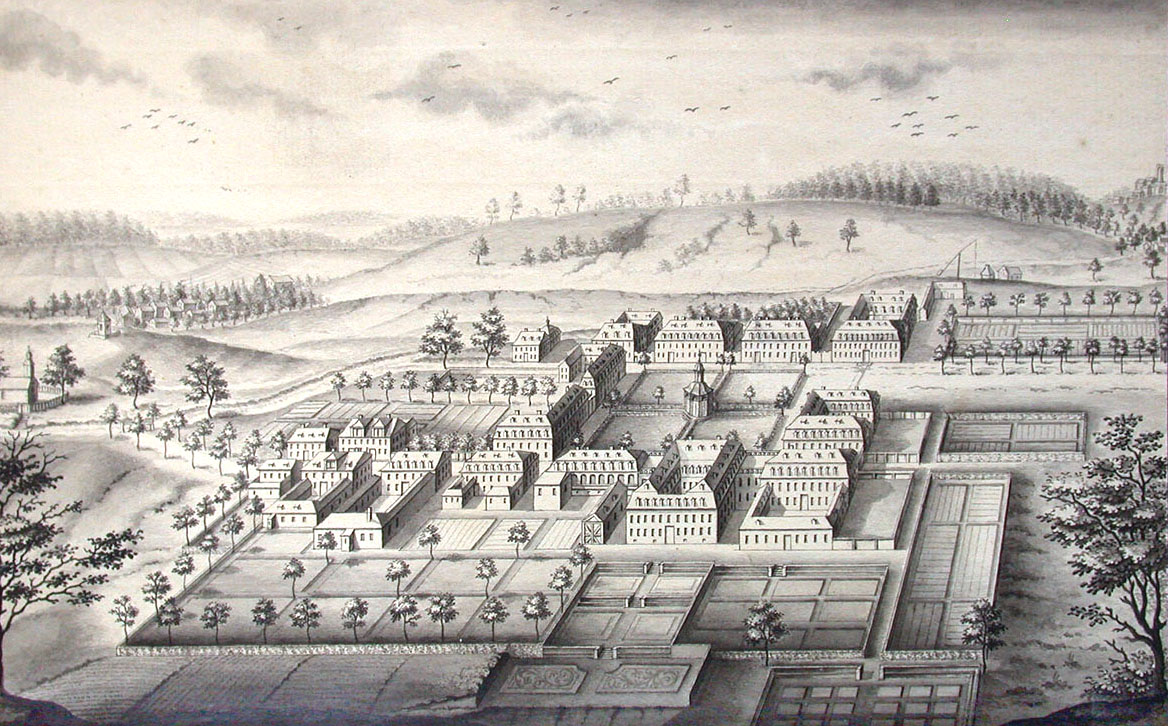
Herrnhaag as it looked in 1750.

Herrnhaag (Lord's Grove) was a communal spiritual centre for the Moravian Unity, an early form of Protestantism. It and Marienborn, a nearby sister community, are located in the Wetterau, an area of Hesse, north of Frankfurt am Main in Germany.

== Spiritual purpose as the home of Christ ==
“Herrnhaag was designed to express the Moravian ideal before it was built” and served a unique purpose: it was planned as the House of God. There were to be twelve gates following the description of New Jerusalem in Revelation. In the center was the well of the water of life also recalling Revelation: “Then the angel showed me the river of the water of life, bright as crystal, flowing from the throne of God and of the Lamb through the middle of the street of the city” (Revelation 22:1).

According to church leader Nicolaus Ludwig von Zinzendorf, who planned the community, the Moravian Unity anticipated “the end time when the heavenly reality would become the total reality.” Living in that end time was the purpose of Herrnhaag, which was designed to be the residence of Christ. According to Zinzendorf, “We have [the Holy Spirit’s] care to thank for the fact that we are brought here together, that we dwell in a Mother-city.”

== Formation and organization as a community living in Christ ==
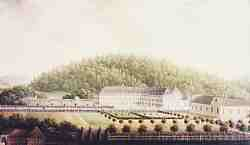
Marienborn as it looked in the mid-18th century.

During exile from the family estates in Saxony, Zinzendorf began negotiating for Marienborn as a residence for what was called the Pilgrim Congregation. Before it was available, he brought his family to stay at the Ronneburg, a dilapidated castle in the area. Eventually the Zinzendorfs moved into Marienborn and construction of Herrnhaag began in 1738. The community was unfinished at the time of its abandonment in the early 1750s.

Community members lived under the direct rule of Christ as the community’s chief elder and shepherd. Herrnhaag was the church’s fastest growing settlement and the one most criticized for heresy.

The community’s focal point was the great hall, the Saal, the place of ritual and worship. The Saal was built on two levels, with a balcony overlooking the main floor, representing earthly reality below and the heaven reality above. The festivals held in the Saal provided a multimedia effect on worshippers resulting from the combination of illuminations, music, ritual, paintings and pageantry.

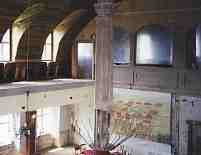
The Saal or hall, scene of festivals and religious ceremonies.

The cantata written for the dedication of Herrnhaag’s Single Brethren’s House in 1739 shows how community residents looked upon their lives as dedicated to Christ “You know how much we cherish you, most magnificent of all gifts! Precious offering of grace from above! Bless the sacred marriage. Bless the sacred virginity . . . the young men’s strength will be gathered for knighthood in your service . . . This house shall become, and those that live therein, your glorification here on earth!”

As with other Moravian communities, living arrangements were based on the separation of members according to age, marital status and gender into so-called choirs. Each choir had its own festivals. The festival of the Single Brothers at Herrnhaag in 1748 included the glorification of Christ's sidehole wound, considered sacred because it represented Christ's compassionate, sacrificing love. Christian Renatus von Zinzendorf, Nicolaus Ludwig's son, led the ceremony making it clear that he literally had become the sidehole of Christ and when he embraced the men, they were embraced by the sidehole. There was also a pictorial representation of the sidehole large enough that each man could enter and pass through it. In this way the men understood they were becoming one with Christ.

== Scandal, dispersal and abandonment ==
What was condemned as heretical by many towards events at Herrnhaag was the blending of the sexual and the spiritual, the human and the divine. Based on writings of Christian Zinzendorf proclaiming all souls to be female, the brothers were proclaimed by Christian Renatus to actually be female and therefore eligible to be brides of Christ who could be entered and filled. There is some evidence that they practiced this literally among themselves and perhaps between the sexes as well, though one should be careful to make conclusions, as the times of Count Zinzendorf were immersed in slander and defamatory libels, of which it is difficult to distinguish between true and false (a famous example is Voltaire's "Vie privée du roi de Prusse"). Original sources should be a primary source. Of such, Count Zinzendorfs "Anhang, als ein zweiter Theil zu dem Gesang-Buche der Evangelischen Brüder-Gemeinen" (Addition, as a second part to the song-book of the evangelical brother-congregations), S. I. [1745], was often referred to in the contemporary controversies, and an example can be given here of a scandalous and possibly promiscuous and blasphemous passage (page 2016, original orthography): No. 2143, "Zum 2. Julii 1745", 2. Verse (of the Lamb, Christ): "Das weibliche geschlecht hat den respect und recht, zu tragen deine seelen in solchen leibes-hölen, die dich als GOtt empfangen, daraus du menschlich gangen (The female sex have the respect and right, to bear thy soul in such body-holes, which thy as God received, from there out you humanly went)". In 1748, Alexander Volck, a lawyer and of public station in the nearby town of Büdingen, started to publish books (first anonymous, then under his own name) about the promiscuities and also diverse about Count Z. himself, e.g. that he traveled with his mistress, Anna Nitschmann (1715 - 1760) in their own luxurious horse-carriage. The publication of these books caused great stir, and is probably a main reason why the Count suddenly in the same year moved to London, of a fear he might be arrested by the authorities in Büdingen.

Many within and without the church were scandalized by rumors of such behavior and Ludwig von Zinzendorf finally decided to take action, threatening to whip those involved. Christian and others were called to Lindsey House outside London where Nicholas was living.

The residents of Herrnhaag began dispersing after this. In addition to the bad publicity, Herrnhaag and its festivals were a financial drain on the church. But the decision to actually close the settlement was the result of the new local ruler, Gustav Friedrich Count of Ysenburg-Büdingen, who demanded that the Moravians abjure Nicolaus Ludwig von Zinzendorf and swear fealty only to himself. Every one of the residents refused to comply, and began to emigrate in 1750, and the community was abandoned by 1753.

== Modern Moravian community ==
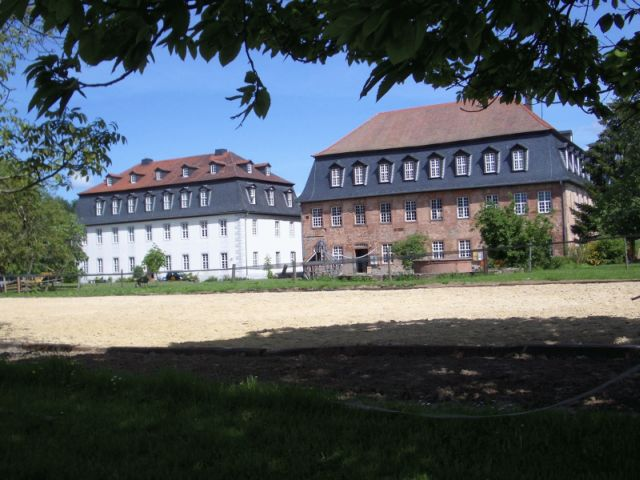
The Sisters' House to the left and the Lichtenburg on the right.

In the latter twentieth-century Herrnhaag was resettled as a Moravian commune and restoration work was begun on the Lichtenburg, the "Fortress of Light", containing the Saal worship hall and the rooms where Count Nicolaus Ludwig von Zinzendorf had lived, and the Sisters' House. As of 2009, other buildings are privately owned such as the Single Brethren's House, where Christian Renatus lived, which is now a farm house. The community well remains in the center of the property.
