= Nazareth Hall =

School in Nazareth, Pennsylvania

Nazareth Hall (1752–1929) was a school in Nazareth, Pennsylvania. It was built, by master mason Melchior Rasp, in 1754 in hopes that Count Nikolaus Ludwig Zinzendorf would return from Europe and settle permanently in the community; he never came back to America. It is located in the Nazareth Hall Tract, listed on the National Register of Historic Places in 1980.

In 1759 Nazareth Hall became the central boarding school for sons of Moravian parents. Later it attained wide fame as a "classical academy." This eventually led to the founding in 1807, of Moravian College and Theological Seminary now at Bethlehem.

Nazareth Hall developed into a first-class academy during the Civil War era. Under the guidance of Edward H. Reichel, the school was enlarged and attained a notable scholastic standing. Under the military influences of the Civil War, this school adopted a program of military drill for exercise, but it never was a regular military academy as it was sometimes called.

Toward the close of the century its methods and discipline were considerably altered. Laboratories were set up, a regular program of athletics was introduced, and the handsome old Moravian church building on its campus was converted into a gymnasium. The long and valued service of Nazareth Hall came at last to an end in 1928–1929.

== History ==
The Bethlehem Digital History Project notes that, "In the interval between 1754 and 1767, the only set of trombones(2) in the Moravian Church (North) was the one at Bethlehem; and so it came to pass, that the "Bethlehem Trombonists" were frequently called from home to discourse music on their instruments in other Churches. They were present for instance, and performed at the laying of the corner-stone of Nazareth Hall, in May 1755; on the anniversary of the birth of King George II, (October 30, 1754,) that fair complexioned but to art indifferent Hanoverian, who was more than once heard to growl in his German accent, that he saw no good in "bainting and boetry"; at the dedication of the second grave-yard on the Nazareth Tract, in February 1756"

Nazareth Hall advertised nationwide, copy of an advertisement from Harper's Weekly, August 31, 1861, read:

Nazareth Hall. Boarding School for Boys. Nazareth, Northampton Co., Pa.

Easy of access from New York by Central R.R. of New Jersey to Easton, and thence seven miles by stages. Terms, payable quarterly in advance.
Board, and Tuition in the English branches and the German language, per quarter ...............$50.00
Lessons on the Piano Forte, Violin, Flute, and Organ, with use of Instrument, each, per quarter ................$6.00
Lessons in Drawing, Painting, French, Latin, and Greek, each, per quarter ...............$5.00

Agents in New York, Messrs. A. BININGER & CO., Nos. 92 and 94 Liberty Street. REV. EDWARD H. REICHEL, Principal.

== Lore ==
Also found in the Bethlehem Digital History Project is the following story:

Now once upon a time it happened that there lay an inmate of the Single Sisters' House, (the present " Castle " of Nazareth Hall) sick unto death, and it was positively asserted that she was past recovery. Hereupon, our young disciples of Jubal, the son of Lamech, (as they were not in practice) set about preparing themselves to make proclamation of her decease, when she should be deceased, by rehearsing the trio of Chorals prescribed for blowing on the death of an unmarried female. They did this in their room in Nazareth Hall. But it being Summer, as to the season of the year, the windows of their room were open, out of which and over the way into the apartment of the bed-ridden sister were borne the impressive strains of Chorals 151 and 37. Whereupon, rising on her bed, "Die Schlingel!" she exclaimed, "Die Schlingel! die denken dass ich am sterben bin! Aber," she proceeded with emphasis, as she rose higher on her couch, "Aber aus Speit werde ich nicht sterben !" Here was an illustration of the power of the will, for the resolute woman recovered. As to our trombonists, having thus unwittingly scandalized the congregation, they rendered themselves obnoxious, lost favor and ere long were relieved.

Over the remains of three of these once juvenile trombonists, those heart-rending instruments have sounded their woeful tones, and the grass grows green over their graves. The two who are still tabernacling in the flesh, may tell you again, if you ask them, this tale of youthful indiscretion.

== Leadership ==
BECHLER, Johann Christian, principal at Nazareth Hall, married May 1, born January 7, 1784, in Koropoe on the Island of Oesel, now in Estonia, the first s. of Johann Gottlieb end Martha, mn. Land (who d 1790); called for service in the Philadelphia congregation; remained there until 1813, when he was appointed to the station at Staten Island, N.Y.; from 1817 to 1822; later pastor in Lititz; consecrated a bishop; d Aug.(? Apr. 18), 1857 in Herrnhut, Saxony. Married to CUNOW, Augusta Henriette, b May 13, 1792 in Berthelsdorf, the third dau. of Johann Gerhard and Benigna Sophia, mn. Reichel. By Brother Reichel.

Reichel, Charles Gotthold - was born in Germany on July 14, 1751, Reichel came in 1784 to America to open a boarding school for boys at Nazareth, which became Nazareth Hall and is still in existence as Moravian College. As pastor at Nazareth he presided as its first principal for sixteen years. He was made bishop in 1801. Bishop Reichel also served as pastor in Salem (now Winston-Salem) N.C. and Bethlehem, PA before returning to Niesky, Germany in retirement. He died there in 1825.

Reichel, Levin Theodore, Bishop Reichel's son, wrote many works including "History of Nazareth Hall, at Nazareth, Pennsylvania" (Philadelphia, 1855). Levin was born in Bethlehem, PA, March 4, 1812. In the Bethlehem Digital History Project is his marriage announcement: May 28, REICHEL Levine Theodore, b Mar .4,1812 in Bethlehem, a s.of Carl Gotthold and second wife, Catharina, mn. Fetter, and grandson of Rev. Charles G; moved to Germany with parents, and educated in Niesky Theological Seminary; in 1834 returned to America principal of Nazareth Hall; later served in the ministry; ordained a deacon in 1837 and presbyter in 1849; consecrated a bishop in 1869 at Herrnhut; he was the author of a number of valuable his historical works; d May 23, 1878 in Germany. References have been found for both Levin Theodore and William Cornelins as being the author of the "History of Nazareth Hall" book published in 1855.

TIERSCH, Paulus, the first co-director of Nazareth Hall school; born May 14, 1771, from Dinz near Gera, the only s. of Johann Christoph and Catharina; ordained a minister in 1771; d Oct. 16, 1774 in North Carolina. Married to PRICE, Maria, b 1740 in Philadelphia, the second dau.of William and Anna Elisabeth; d 1783 in Bethlehem. She m. secondly, May 17, 1780, Immanuel Nitschmann, who d 1790 in Bethlehem. By Brother Am. Paul Thrane

== Students ==
Bahnson, Henry Theodore 1845–1917) - The University of North Carolina at Chapel Hill has papers belonging to Bahnson, who served in the Civil War and was captured. His biographical sketch includes the comment, "transferring, in 1858, to Nazareth Hall in Pennsylvania, a prominent Moravian institution." Extended information is available at UNC here.

Ross, John Jr. - son of Cherokee Nation Chief John Ross, Ross Jr. was attending Nazareth Hall by September 1863 after transferring from the Lawrenceville School in New Jersey.

Henry, Matthew S. - Henry was a descendant of William Henry, the older, who founded his Gun Factory in Lancaster, and the younger, who moved it to Nazareth (as he refers them in the work). Matthew built the first iron furnace in Northampton County at Jacobsburg in 1824. Married July 16, 1833, HENRY, Matthew schropp (second marriage), b Aug. 10, 1790 in Nazareth, one of nine children of William and Sabina, mn. Schropp; widower, to BERG, Esther Tynel (?)‚ b Dec .27,1809 in England, a dau. of the missionary Christian Friedrich Berg and Hannah, mn. Tempest, by Brother Seidel.

Humphreys, Andrew Atkinson - Head of the Army Corps of Engineers during the Civil War, A.A. Humphreys was both an influential hydraulic engineer and military commander.

Reichel, William Cornelius, Charles Gotthold's grandson, was born in Salem, North Carolina, May 9, 1824. He entered Nazareth Hall in 1834, and attended the Moravian theological seminary from 1839 to 1844. He is considered to be the most significant and comprehensive author of early Moravian history in America.

== Today ==
Today, the Whitfield House Museum has some uniforms from the Nazareth Hall in its Clothing and Textile Exhibit

== Looking Back ==
A wonderful remembrance of life as a student at Nazareth Hall is from the History of Northampton County by Mathew S. Henry, 1851, Presented by Mrs. John McGrath. The original document is in the possession of the Historical Society of Pennsylvania, Philadelphia. Matthew Henry was a descendant of William Henry, the older, who founded his Gun Factory in Lancaster, and the younger, who moved it to Nazareth (as he refers them in the work). Matthew built the first iron furnace in Northampton County at Jacobsburg in 1824. While his time as a student is not known, it can be inferred from his writing that it occurred long before this volume was written:

Schoolmates! will you accompany me to the Garden or pleasure grounds near the Hall? Do you recollect assisting in the planting of those Trees in the lower parts of this Garden, those yet remaining mementos of our toils, now are grown a size that would defy our remaining strength to displace, our arms cannot encircle them; whilst our Shrubbery such as the Rose bushes Sweetbrior, our tulips narcissus and other tender plant have disappeared long time ago. Who of you would not find pleasure in a visit to our bathing place at the Bushkill Creek (three miles north from the Hall) which we called "Klines" our Skaing Ponds in the long Meadow, our ball playing grounds in the woods beyond the Grave Yard. Our Sleigh rides from the upper end of the Grave yard down the hill there towards the Hall. Our excursions to Burrow's (Smith Gap of the Blue Mountain) our hunting the flying Squirrels in the neighboring forests, our taking the black Snakes captive, putting them into our pockets & bosoms in their full vigor, our gathering the hazel nuts Hickory nut Walnut & Chesnut & in these excursions occasionally infringing on the rights of others. Our innocent, gambols diversions of many kind, our likes, our dislikes our quarrels, our fights as miniature men, tell me! my now old & grey headed Men doth not the blood that now usually courses so Sluggishly through our veins, receive an impetus by recurring to those pleasant youthful years of our lives, spent at Nazareth Hall, & that the training then received will not fail to open unto us a blissful eternity, if properly adhered to the maxims then impressed upon our Notice.

And in History of the Moravian Church by Joseph Edmond Hutton (born 1868), it is written:

At Nazareth the Brethren had a school for boys, known as "Nazareth Hall." If this school never served any other purpose, it certainly taught some rising Americans the value of order and discipline. At meals the boys had to sit in perfect silence; and when they wished to indicate their wants, they did so, not by using their tongues, but by holding up the hand or so many fingers. The school was divided into "rooms"; each "room" contained only fifteen or eighteen pupils; these pupils were under the constant supervision of a master; and this master, who was generally a theological scholar, was the companion and spiritual adviser of his charges. He joined in all their games, heard them sing their hymns, and was with them when they swam in the "Deep Hole" in the Bushkill River on Wednesday and Saturday afternoons, when they gathered nuts in the forests, and when they sledged in winter in the surrounding country."
