= William Cornelius Reichel =

William Cornelius Reichel (born in Salem, North Carolina, 9 May 1824; died in Bethlehem, Pennsylvania, 25 October 1876) was a Moravian author in the United States who did much to document and examine the early history of the Moravian church in the United States.

== Biography ==
Reichel was the son of Rev. Benjamin Reichel, of Salem Female Academy; Benjamin was a sixth generation preacher in a family which had preached in Germany and the USA. He entered Nazareth Hall in 1834, and in 1839 the Moravian Theological Seminary, where he was graduated in 1844. After serving as tutor for four years at Nazareth Hall, he became a professor in the theological seminary. He was ordained a deacon in June 1862, and a presbyter in May 1864.

In 1862 he was appointed to the charge of Linden Hall Seminary, Lititz, Pennsylvania, which he resigned in 1868. From 1868 until 1876; he then served as professor of Latin and natural sciences in the seminary for young ladies at Bethlehem.

A heat wave in 1876 led to typhoid fever which caused his death on 25th of October, 1876.

== Works ==
Reichel did more than any one else to elucidate the early history of the Moravian church in the United States. In addition to articles in The Moravian and the local press, and a sketch of Northampton County, prepared for William H. Egle's History of Pennsylvania, he wrote:

- History of Nazareth Hall (Philadelphia, 1855; enlarged ed., 1869)
- History of the Bethlehem Female Seminary, 1785-1858 (1858)
- Moravianism in New York and Connecticut (1860)
- Memorials of the Moravian Church (1870)
- Wyalusing, and the Moravian Mission at Friedenshuetten (Bethlehem, 1871)
- Names which the Lenni Lennapé or Delaware Indians gave to Rivers, Streams, and Localities within the States of Pennsylvania, New Jersey, Maryland, and Virginia, with their Significations, from a manuscript of John Heckewelder (1872)
- A Red Rose from the Olden Time, or a Ramble through the Annals of the Rose Inn on the Barony of Nazareth in the Days of the Province (Philadelphia, 1872)
- The Crown Inn, near Bethlehem, Pa., 1745 (1872)
- The Old Sun Inn at Bethlehem, Pa., 1758 (Doylestown, Pa., 1873)
- A Register of Members of the Moravian Church, 1727 to 1754 (Bethlehem, 1873)
- John Heckewelder, History, Manners, and Customs of the Indian Nations who once Inhabited Pennsylvania and the Neighboring States, revised edition (Philadelphia, 1876)

He left unfinished History of Bethlehem and History of Northampton County.
