= Peter Boehler =

Peter Bohler
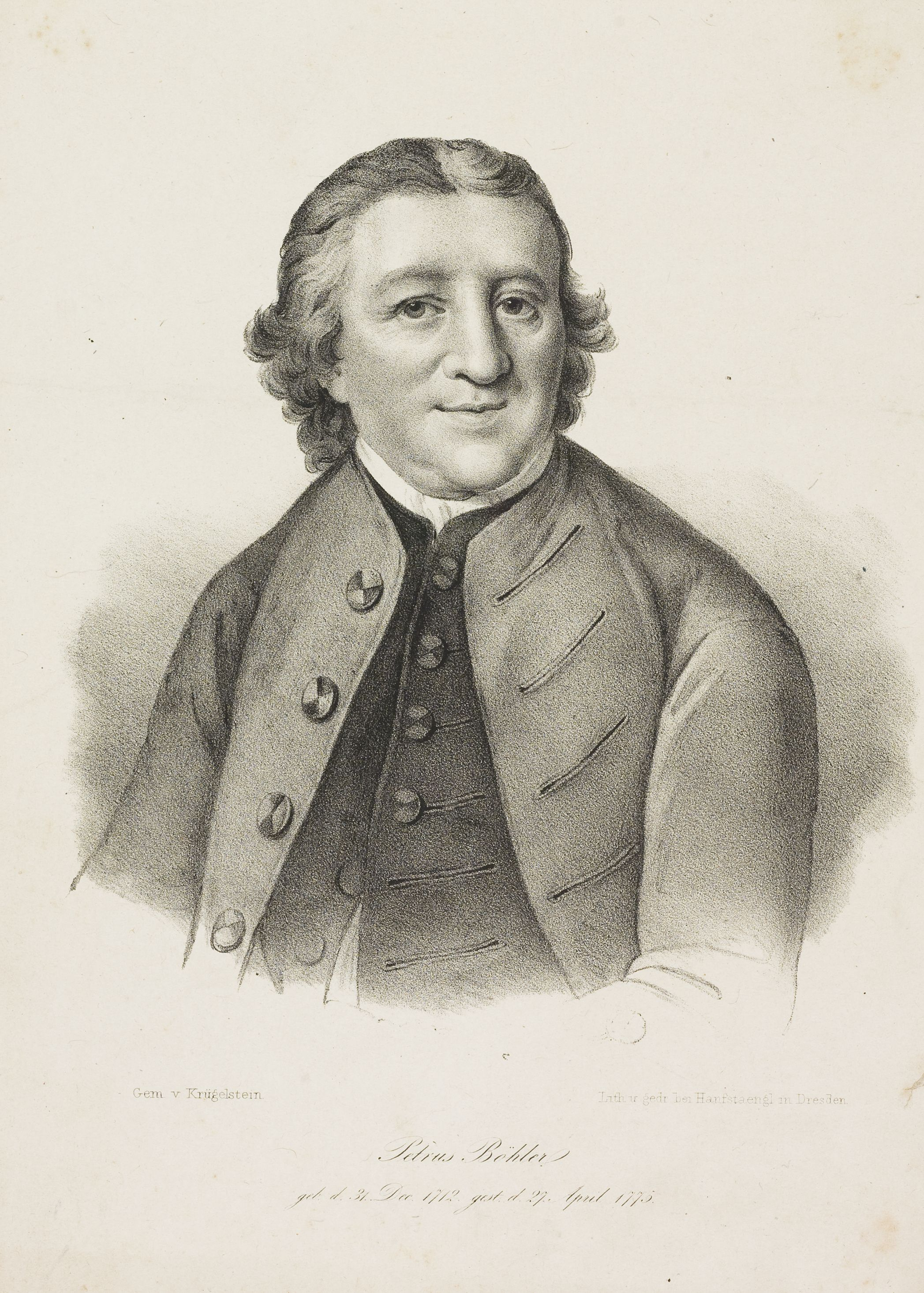
- Church: Moravian Church

Personal details
- Born: December 31, 1712 Frankfurt, Holy Roman Empire
- Died: April 27, 1775 (aged 62) London, England
- Occupation: Missionary and bishop

Peter Bohler (also spelled Boehler; born Petrus Böhler; December 31, 1712 – April 27, 1775) was a German-English Moravian bishop and missionary who was influential in the Moravian Church in the Americas and England during the eighteenth century.

Bohler was one of the many missionaries sent out to the Americas in the early 18th century by the leader of the Moravian Church, Nicolaus Ludwig Zinzendorf. As a part of the first large scale Protestant missionary movement, Bohler spread the religion across Georgia and other American colonies. In 1740, he migrated with other Moravians to Pennsylvania, where they founded the towns of Nazareth and Bethlehem. Bohler was superintendent of the Moravian Church in England from 1747 to 1753 and was made a bishop of the church in 1748. Bohler came back to America and directed new Moravian settlements in the colonies from 1753 to 1764.

== Early life ==
Bohler was born in Frankfurt am Main, then part of Holy Roman Empire, on December 31, 1712. Peter was the fourth child of brewers Johann Konrad Peter Böhler and his wife Antonetta Elisabetha. Bohler attended school in Frankfurt, and went to the University of Jena in 1731. His father wanted him to study medicine, but Bohler was drawn into studying theology by the university's well-known faculty members such as Johann Franz Buddeus, Johann Georg Walch and Nicolaus Ludwig Zinzendorf. Walch and Zinzendorf greatly influenced Bohler and showed him the ways of Pietism, a movement within Lutheranism that was instrumental in the upbringing of the Methodist movement later started by John Wesley. The Pietist movement combined the Lutheran emphasis on biblical doctrine with the Reformed, but with a particular emphasis on a vigorous Christian life and behavior over intellectual doctrine. Zinzendorf used his influence on the Moravian Church to gather more supporters of the Pietist movement, including Bohler.

== As a missionary ==
On December 15, 1737, in his first official act as bishop, Count von Zinzendorf ordained Bohler to priesthood. On February 7 of the following year, when he was in London preparing for his trip to the Americas, Bohler met John Wesley, who would later found the Methodist movement, who had just returned from a two-year stint as chaplain of Savannah, Georgia. After Wesley met Bohler at the home of a Mr. Weinatz, a Dutch merchant living in London at the time, Wesley offered to obtain lodging for Bohler and introduced him to James Hutton, who would later be an important official in the Moravian Church. Wesley accompanied Bohler on his trip to Oxford, during which the two began an extensive and very personal discourse on the nature of faith. Wesley had returned to England as a troubled man, depressed over his lack of faith and his work in America. At the time, Wesley wrote in his journal, "I who went to America to convert others was never myself converted to God". Bohler's counsel on the nature of grace and "heart religion" was instrumental in the conversions of both John and Charles Wesley.

Bohler first went as a missionary to America, in 1738, on the ship "Union Galley," with his assistant George Schulius, at the invitation of General James Oglethorpe. The ship was bound for Savannah, Georgia, a city which Gen. Oglethorpe had founded, in 1733. Gen Oglethorpe had already organized two prior voyages to Savannah with Moravians, in 1735 and 1736. The "Union Galley" departed Rotterdam on April 28, 1738, with a large number of Moravians and Germans onboard, including 53 Germans from the towns of Freudenberg, Plittershagen, Boeschen, and Anstoss. However, for various reasons, including the ship needing extensive repairs, and waiting for the winds to be favorable, it did not start its journey across the ocean until July 16th. The ship landed in Savannah, Georgia on September 29, 1738. Shortly after that, Bohler and Schulis headed to South Carolina, to preach to the black slaves. As part of Zinzendorf's plans to revive the Moravian Church, Bohler preached the ways of the religion to black slaves and Native Americans, as well as white settlers in the colonies. In 1739, most Moravians, and all of the Germans, left Savannah, because of the threats of attack, from the Spanish, down in Florida, as well as the hot, humid weather, and the devastating impact of yellow fever on the residents. In 1740, the last few Moravians left Savannah, because they refused to take up arms against the Spanish, who were down in Florida and threatening to attack, once again; the other residents of Savannah had demanded that the Moravians take up arms, or else they would burn their houses down. Bohler led that group of Moravians to Pennsylvania. They founded the towns of Nazareth and Bethlehem, both of which are still-thriving populous Moravian communities. Bohler was almost a savior for many of the Moravian people in these communities. During times of crisis, he was seen as the preacher who could restore the peace and hope that people were so desperately looking for. He went back to England to organize a new group of people to send to America. This group of emigrants called the "Sea Congregation" traveled with Boehler and settled in Bethlehem, Pennsylvania in 1742.

Universalist tendencies were not unknown among Moravians and Bohler himself believed in the universal reconciliation of all people. Bohler believed that the grace of Christ was so compelling that it would eventually win all hearts, a belief that is subtly distinct from Universalism. George Whitefield (an ardent Calvinist), in a letter to John Wesley, wrote that Bohler had expressed a belief that "all the damned souls would hereafter be brought out of hell."

After five years, he was made superintendent of the Moravian Church in England. The following year, Bohler was ordained as a bishop of the Moravian churches in America and England. In 1753, Bohler left his post as superintendent, and returned to America. He then served as the director of new Moravian settlements there until 1764. Bohler spent the last nine years of his life back in England, still an active member of the church. He died in London on April 27, 1775, at the age of sixty-two.

== In film ==
The character of Peter Bohler is portrayed by actor Bill Oberst Jr. in the 2009 feature film Wesley, opposite Burgess Jenkins as John Wesley.
