= Lindsey House =

Coordinates: 51.4822°N 0.1745°W

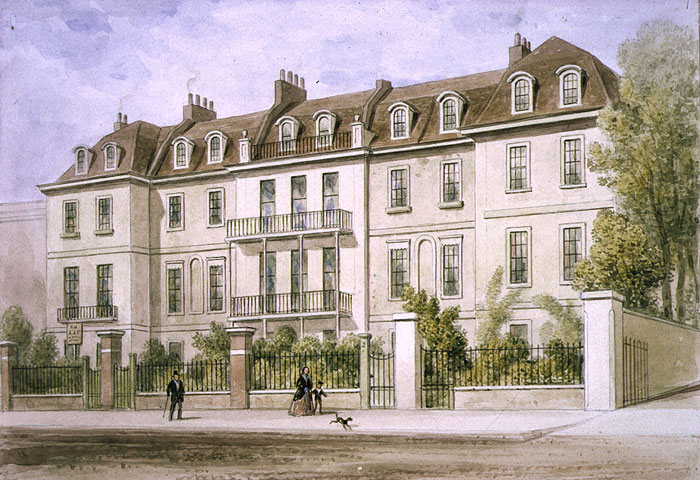
- An 1850 watercolour of the house by Thomas Hosmer Shepherd
- Interactive map of the Lindsey House area

General information
- Type: Town house
- Location: Cheyne Walk; London, SW3; United Kingdom
- Completed: 1674; 352 years ago
- Client: Robert Bertie, 3rd Earl of Lindsey
- Owner: National Trust

Listed Building – Grade II*
- Official name: 95-101, CHEYNE WALK, SW3
- Designated: 5 June 1984
- Reference no.: 1189891

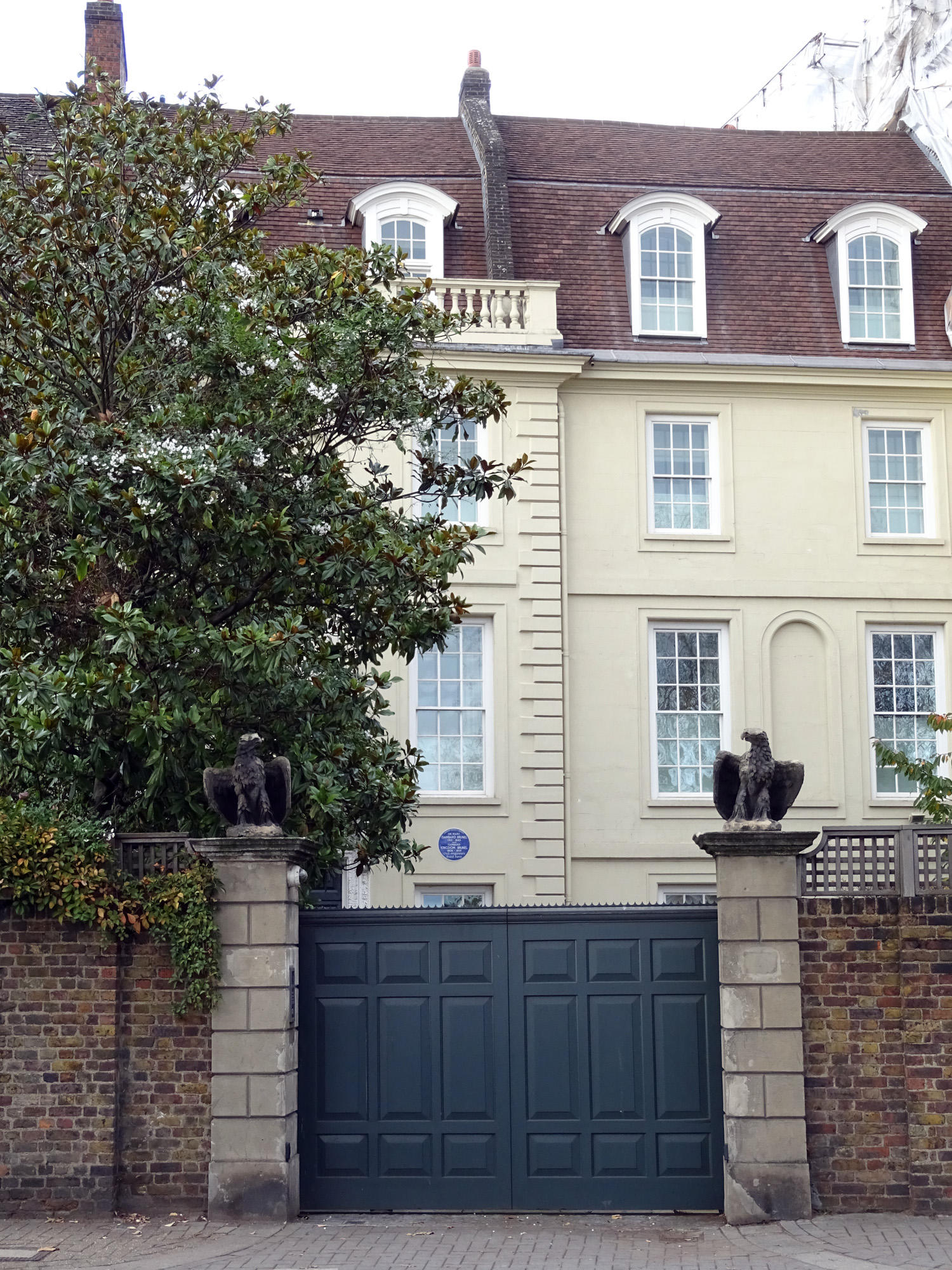
Lindsey House in November 2015

Lindsey House is a Grade II* listed villa in Cheyne Walk, Chelsea, London. It is owned by the National Trust but tenanted and only open by special arrangement.

This house should not be confused with the eponymous 1640 house in Lincoln's Inn Fields. That house came to be known as Lindsey House for its occupation in the 18th century by later Earls of Lindsey.

The gardens of Lindsey House are Grade II listed on the Register of Historic Parks and Gardens.

== History ==
The house was built in 1674 by Robert Bertie, 3rd Earl of Lindsey on the riverside site of Thomas More's garden and is thought to be the oldest house in Kensington and Chelsea.

Lindsey House was extensively remodelled in 1750 by Count Zinzendorf for the Moravian community in London.

The house was divided into four separate dwellings in 1775. Today, it occupies nos. 96 to 101 of Cheyne Walk, covering a number of separate frontages and outbuildings. Previous residents have included the historical painter John Martin, in one of the outbuildings at 4 Lindsey Row from 1849 to 1853 and James McNeill Whistler between 1866 and 1878 at 2 Lindsey Row (now 96 Cheyne Walk). In 1808, engineer Marc Brunel lived in the middle section of the house (now no. 98), and his son Isambard Kingdom Brunel grew up here. These residencies are commemorated by Blue plaques on the walls of the house.

The great staircase of house by Zinzendorf's initiative was full of paintings, with John Valentine Haidt's painting Edward VI Granting Permission to John a Lasco to Set Up a Congregation for European Protestants in London in 1550 at the centre. Lasco was at the time claimed as one of the predecessors of the Moravian Church, In effect, Lasco was portrayed in the liturgical costume of a Moravian presbyter. Other pictures at the staircase were portrait of King Svatopluk I of Moravia, portrait of Waldensian elder Stephanus, portrait of the Patriarch of Constantinople and portrait of John Amos Comenius.

The house was separated from the river by the construction of the Chelsea Embankment, completed in 1874, as a part of Joseph Bazalgette's grand scheme to create a modern sewage system.

One part of the house features a garden designed by Edwin Lutyens and Gertrude Jekyll in 1911 for the Irish art dealer Sir Hugh Lane, who bought the west wing of the house in 1909. This is a small garden of 50 feet (15.2 m) by 30 feet (9.1 m), laid to grass, two broad paths with two narrow paths on the boundary run the length of the garden around an ancient mulberry tree and lily pond. This area is surrounded by statuary, a colonnade and a single flower border. The garden is said by Lennox-Boyd be "modest in its elements, quietly restful in its effect" and "to respect the simple formality of the house". In 2000, the garden was restored and a glazed garden room was added to the house by Marcus Beale Architects.

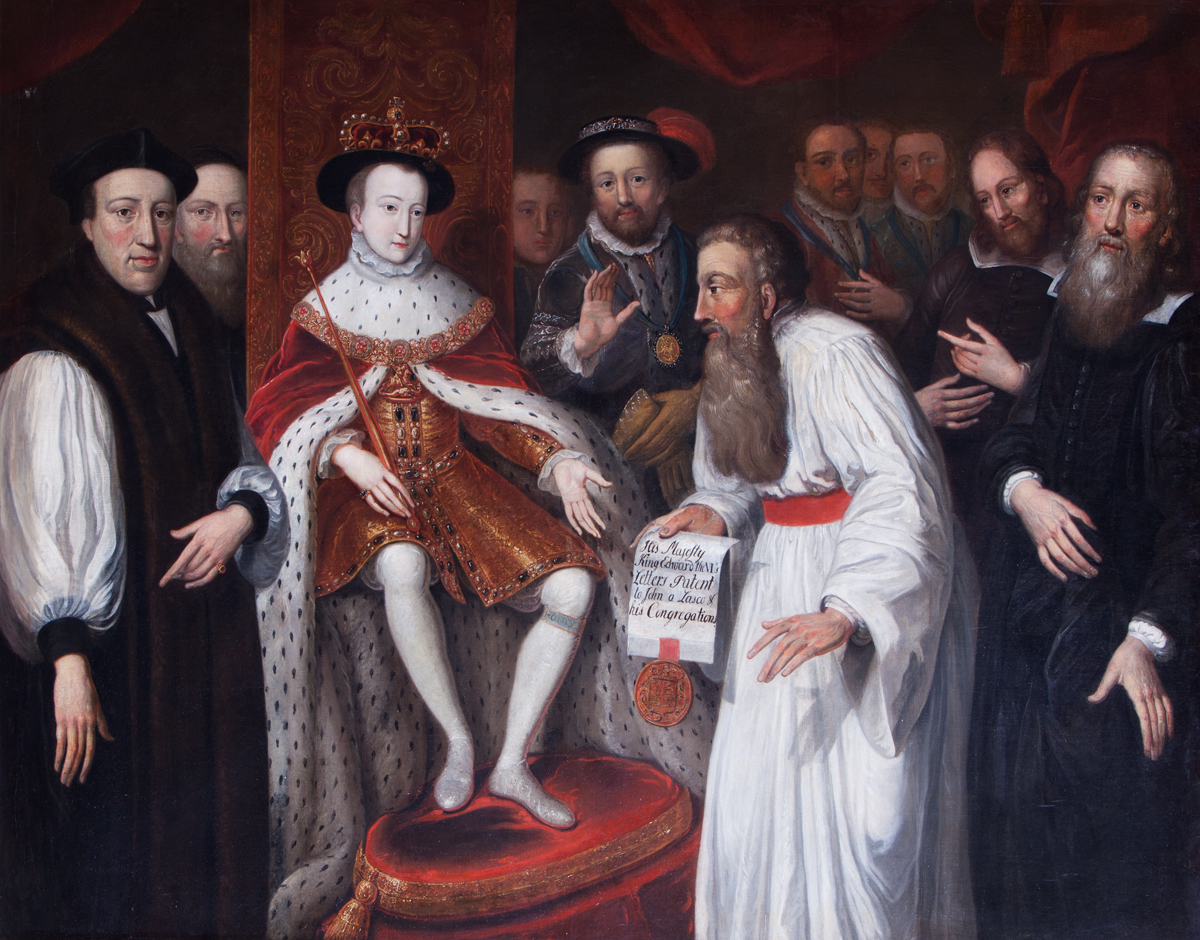
The main picture at house during Zinzendorf's time - Edward VI Granting Permission to John a Lasco to Set Up a Congregation for European Protestants in London in 1550 by John Valentine Haidt (c. 1750)

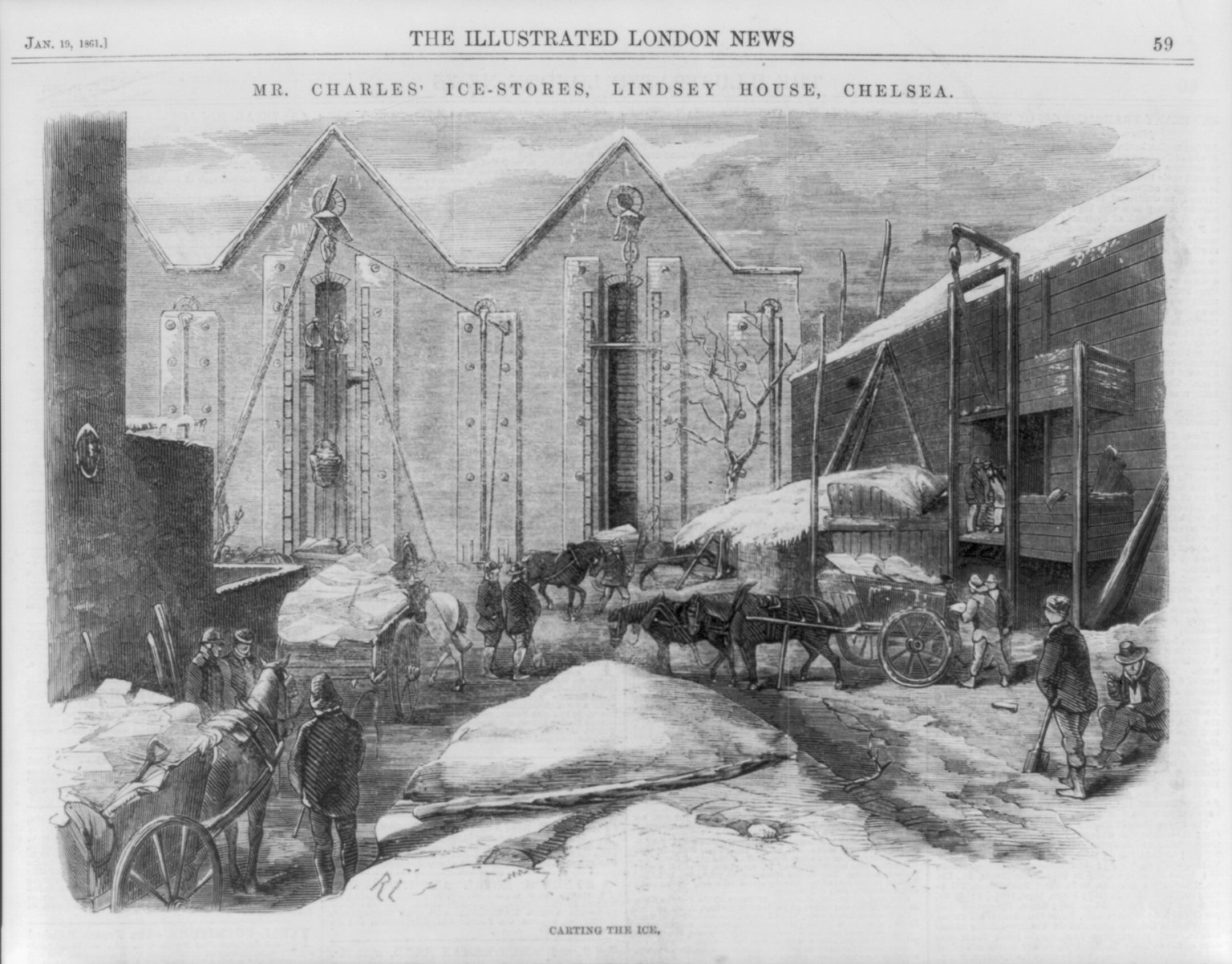
The nearby Mr. Charles' ice-stores, Lindsey House, Chelsea in 1861

== Influence ==
Inigo Jones created a design draft for the Lindsey House. It inspired the architecture by Georg Wenzeslaus von Knobelsdorff for "Klingnersches Haus" at the Old Market Square of Potsdam near Berlin in Germany.

== See also ==
- Carlyle's House is a nearby NT property in Cheyne Row

== Bibliography ==
- The Story of Lindsey House, Chelsea Peter Kroyer
