= Nitschmann =

Nitschmann is a German surname, and may refer to:

- Anna Nitschmann (1715–1760), a Moravian Brethren missionary (Missionarin), lyrical poet, and wife of Nikolaus von Zinzendorf
- David Nitschmann der Wagner (1676–1758), a Czech-born Moravian missionary and carpenter
- David Nitschmann der Bischof (1695–1772), a missionary of the Moravian Brethren and the first "Bishop" (Bischof der Brüdergemeine)
- David Nitschmann der Syndikus (1705–1779), a Czech-born Moravian missionary
- Thomas Nitschmann (1970), a karate and national karate team coach in Germany.
