= John Valentine Haidt =

German-born American painter and Moravian preacher

John Valentine Haidt (an anglicanization of Johann Valentin Haidt) (1700–1780) was a German-born American painter and Moravian preacher in Pennsylvania.

== Life ==
Haidt was born in Danzig, Prussia (modern day Gdańsk, Poland). He was educated at Berlin, and studied painting at Venice, Rome, Paris, and London.

When he was 45 or 46 years old, Haidt set out on an artistic career. He immigrated to British North America in 1754. He was ordained a deacon of the Moravian Church, and evangelized.

Haidt is known for his early dramatic paintings depicting Biblical ideas, and his later portraits of Moravian church members and early leaders of Bethlehem, Pennsylvania. He died on 18 January 1780, at Bethlehem, Pennsylvania.

== Paintings ==
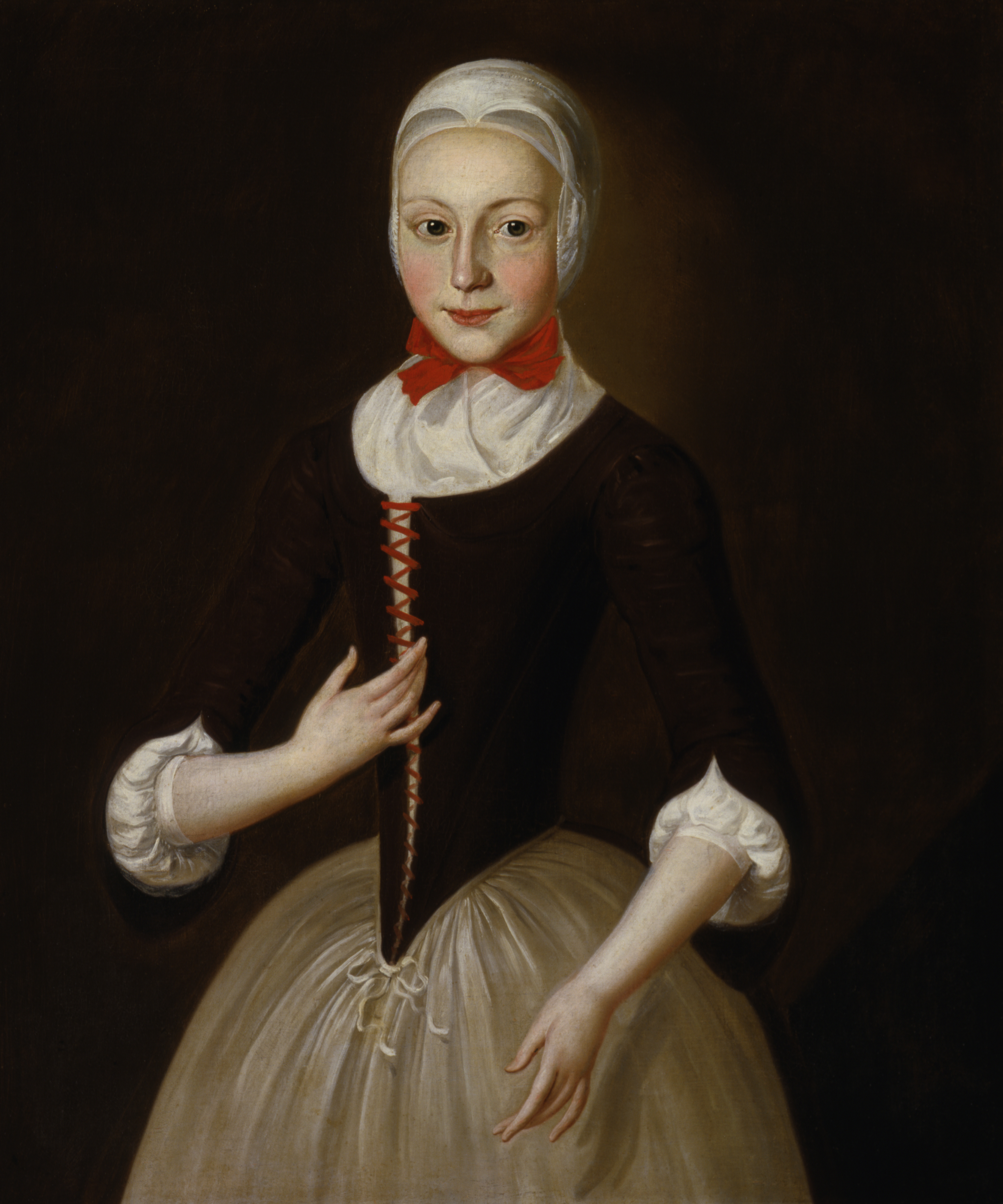
Young Moravian Girl c. 1755–60, oil

- Young Moravian Girl c. 1755–60 (Smithsonian American Art Museum)
- Rest on the Flight into Egypt 1754–1774
- Christ Before Herod 1762
- Johannetta Ettwein 1754
- John Ettwein 1754
- Lamentation Over the Body of Christ 1758
- Christ Scourged 1758
- Thomas Doubting 1758
- Edward VI Granting Permission to John a Lasco to Set Up a Congregation for European Protestants in London in 1550

Works preserved at the Moravian Archives, Bethlehem, Pennsylvania (partial list):

- John Ettwein, 1754
- Anna Nitschmann
- Rebecca and Eliezer at the Well
- Portrait of a Young Girl
- Nativity
- Nathanael Seidel
- Georg Neisser
- Martin Mack, ca. 1757/1758
- Johann Michael Graff, ca. 1759/1760
- Andreas Anton Lawatsch, ca. 1756/1757
- The First Fruits (Erstlingsbild)
- Anna Rosina Anders, ca. 1759/1760
- Johann Arbo
- Christian G. Seidel, ca. 1756/1757
- Ferdinand Dettmers
- Leonhard Dober
- Abraham and Isaac
- Pentecost
- Father David Nitschmann
- Christian Renatus von Zinzendorf
- Johann and Susanna Nitschmann
- David Zeisberger, ca. 1761/1762
- Lindsey House Staircase, I, 1752
- Lindsey House Staircase, II, 1752
- Zinzendorf's Grand Tour, 1719-1721, bef. 1754
- The Act of Parliament, 1749, bef. 1754
- Catharina Huber
- Friedrich Cammerhoff
- August Gottlieb Spangenberg
- Friedrich Martin
- Amadeus Paul Thrane, aft. 1761
- Anna Maria Lawatsch
- Anna Mack
- Catharina Theodora Neisser
- Gottlieb Bezold (Pezold), ca. 1756/1757
- Peter Boehler
- Paul Muenster, ca. 1761
- Jesus Showing His Side Wound
- Martha Spangenberg
- Elisabeth Boehler
- Gertraud Graff
- George Burnet, ca. 1757
- Ismaiah Burnet, ca. 1757
- Nativity of Christ, ca. 1750

== Literature ==
- Vernon H. Nelson. John Valentine Haidt: The Life of a Moravian Painter. Bethlehem: Moravian Archives, 2012.
