= Moravian slaves =

The Moravian Slaves, a popular narrative about Christian Missions concerning Johann Leonhard Dober and David Nitschmann, describes how these two young Moravian Brethren from Herrnhut, Germany, were called in 1732 to minister to the African slaves on the islands of St. Thomas and St. Croix in the Danish West Indies. Allegedly, when they were told that they would not be allowed to do such a thing, Dober and Nitschmann sold themselves to a slave owner and boarded a ship bound for the West Indies. As the ship pulled away from the docks, it is said that they called out to their loved ones on shore, "May the Lamb that was slain receive the reward of His suffering!"

== Mission to St. Thomas and St. Croix ==
The missionaries did assert that they were willing to become slaves if it was the only way to reach the slaves. Many sources claim that they actually followed through, sold themselves, boarded a ship, and were never heard from again. In fact, after being sent out by Count Nicolaus Ludwig Zinzendorf, the two traveled from Herrnhut to Copenhagen, Denmark, where their plan initially met with strong opposition. When asked by a court official how they would support themselves, Nitschmann replied,

“We shall work as slaves among the slaves."

“But,” said the official, “that is impossible. It will not be allowed. No white man ever works as a slave.”

“Very well,” replied Nitschmann, “I am a carpenter, and will ply my trade.”

After some difficulty, the missionaries found support from the Danish Queen and her court, and although the Danish West Indian Company refused to grant them passage, a ship was eventually procured. Leaving Copenhagen on Oct 8, 1732, they arrived in St. Thomas two months later on December 13. While in the St. Thomas, they lived frugally and preached to the slaves, and they had a certain amount of success. By 1734 they had both returned to Germany, but other Moravian missionaries continued the work, establishing churches on St. Thomas, St. Croix, St. John's, Jamaica, Antigua, Barbados, and St. Kitts. Moravian missionaries baptized 13,000 converts before any other missionaries arrived on the scene.

After returning from the West Indies, both men continued to serve in the Moravian church, and both were ordained as bishops. Dober remained in Europe, but Nitschmann traveled with John Wesley and helped to found the mission at Bethlehem, Pennsylvania.
