= David Nitschmann =

David Nitschmann may refer to:

- David Nitschmann der Wagner (1676-1758), Czech-born Moravian missionary and carpenter
- David Nitschmann der Bischof (1695-1772), missionary of the Moravian Brethren and the first "Bishop" (Bischof der Brüdergemeine).
- David Nitschmann der Syndikus (1705-1779), Czech-born Moravian missionary
