= Anna Maria Lawatsch =

Moravian eldress and hymnwriter

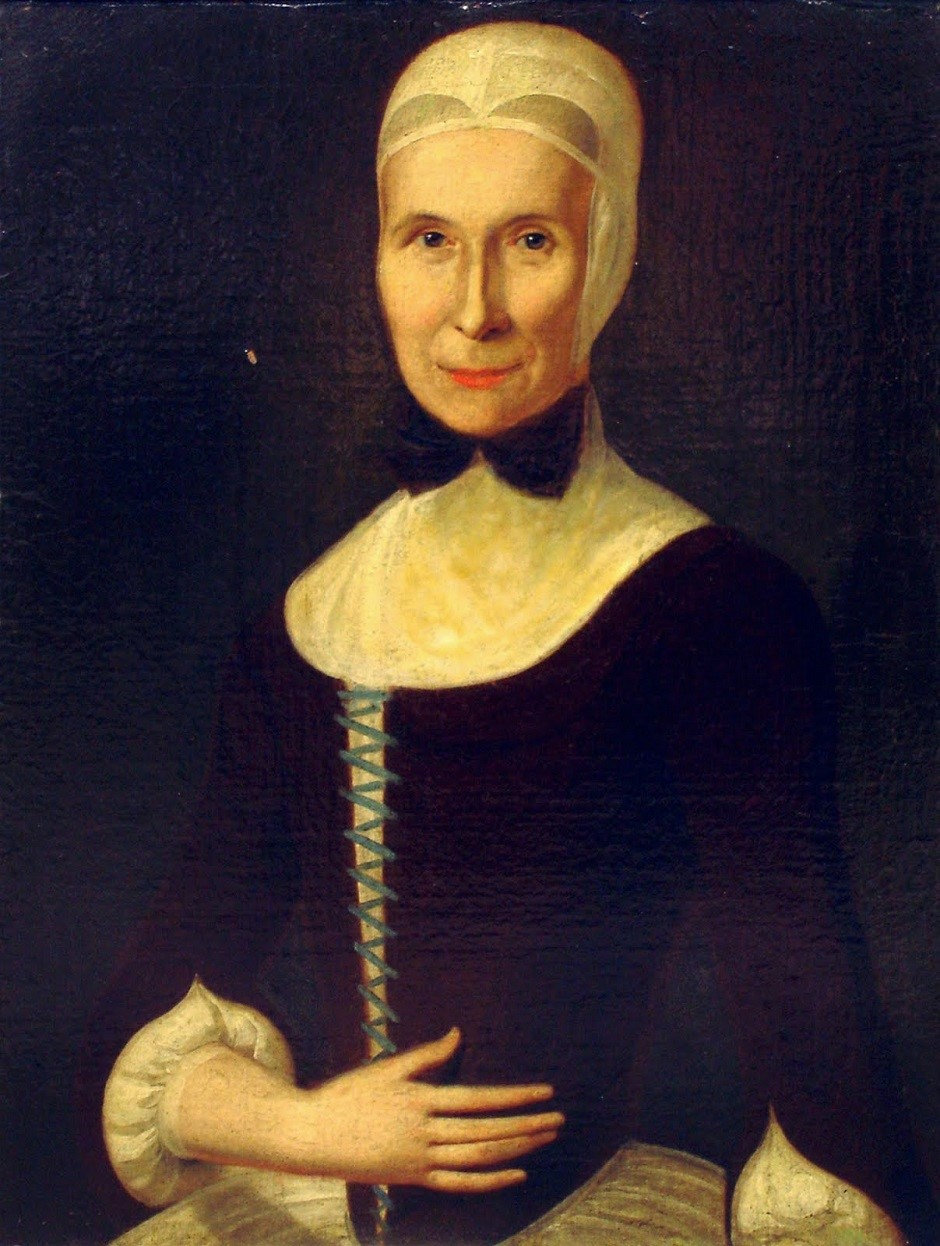
- portrait by Johann Valentin Haidt
- Born: November 17, 1712; Moravia
- Died: January 20, 1760; Bethlehem
- Occupations: Hymnwriter, choir director, diarist
- Father: Tobias Demuth
- Relatives: Gottlieb Demuth, Sr.

Anna Maria Demuth Lawatsch (November 17, 1712 – January 20, 1760) was a Moravian eldress and hymnwriter.

== Biography ==
Anna Maria Demunt was born on November 17, 1712 in Moravský Karlov, a village in Moravia in the present day Czech Republic, the daughter of Tobias Demuth and Rosina Tonn Demuth. Her father died when she was three years old. Members of the Moravian Church were persecuted at the time and her mother and sister were imprisoned, so she and other members of her family fled to Herrnhut, a village founded by Moravian Church refugees. In 1733, she became governess to Heinrich XXXI Count Reuss, young son of Heinrich XXIX, Count of Reuss-Ebersdorf, and the next year governess to Anna and Maria Agnes von Zinzendorf, daughters of Moravian bishop Nicolaus Zinzendorf.

In 1738, she married Rev. Andrew Anton Lawatsch. They immigrated to America on board the Irene in 1751. They served in various Moravian communities in Pennsylvania.

Lawatsch died on 20 January 1760 in Bethlehem, Pennsylvania.

== Hymns ==
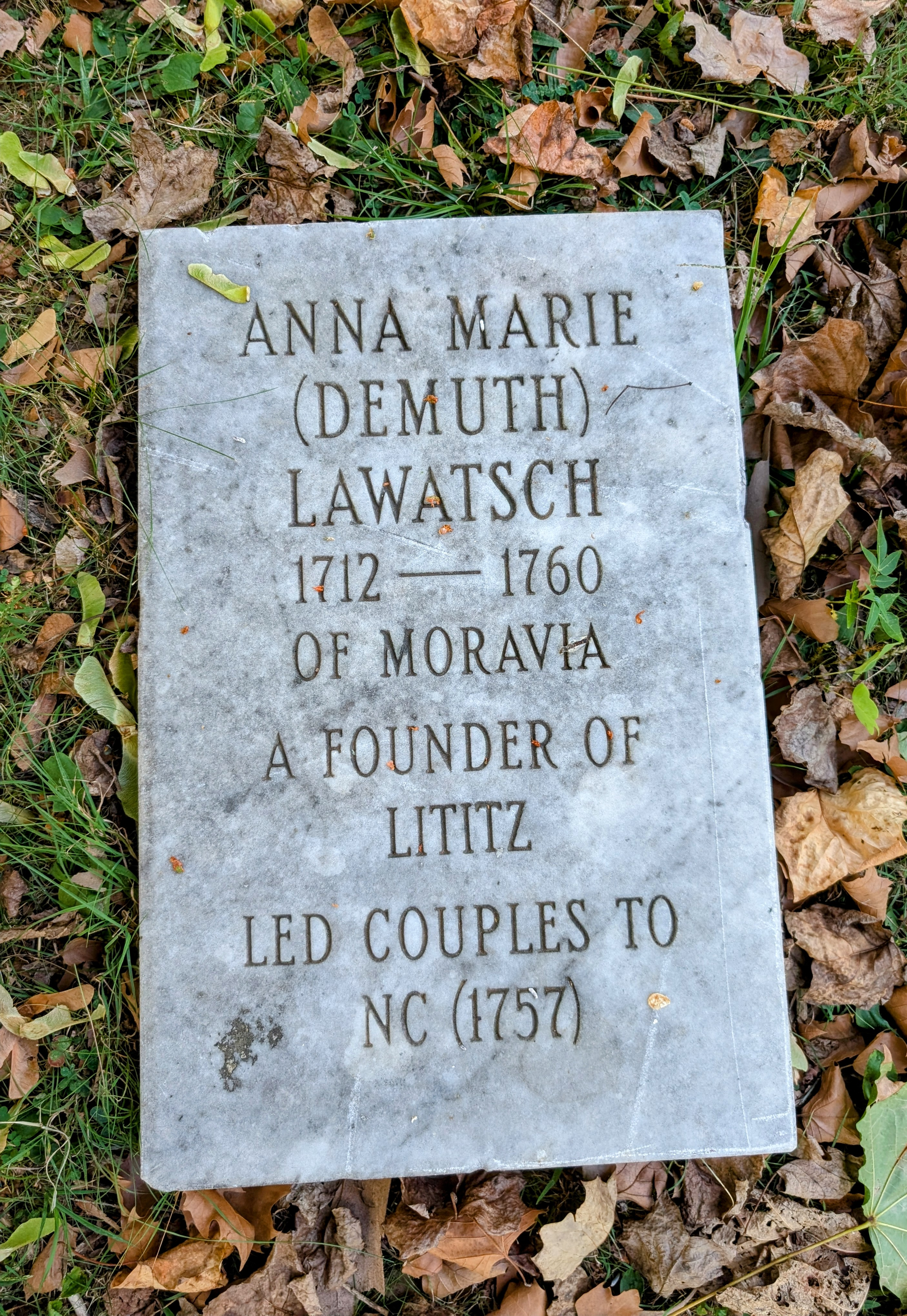
Lawatsch's gravestone at the Moravian Cemetery in Bethlehem, Pennsylvania

- Her hymn "Schiesse nieder, thränenbach" was written in 1741 on the occasion of the departure of Zinzendorf for America. Her other hymns include "Liebste Herzen! gehet hin" ("Dearest Heart! Goeth Down") and "O was wird mein Herz gewahr" ("O Who Knows My Heart").
