= David Nitschmann der Wagner =

- Born: David Nitschmann; September 18, 1676; Zauchtenthal, Moravia
- Died: April 14, 1758 (aged 81); Bethlehem, Pennsylvania, U.S.
- Occupation: Missionary
- Known for: Co-founder of Bethlehem, Pennsylvania
- Spouse: Anna Schneider (m. 1700)
- Parent(s): Johannes Nitschmann and Catharina (Friedrickin) Nitschmann

David Nitschmann der Wagner, or David "Father" Nitschmann Sr., (1676, Zauchtenthal/Suchdol nad Odrou - 1758, Pennsylvania) was a Czech-born Moravian missionary and carpenter.

== Biography ==
Born in Zauchtenthal, Moravia, on September 18, 1676, David Nitschmann was a son of Johannes Nitschmann and Catharina (Friedrickin) Nitschmann.

Following the death of his parents in 1692, he continued to reside in Moravia. On November 15, 1700, he wed Anna Schneider, a daughter of Andreas Schneider. The marriage would last thirty-five years.

Sometimes referred to as "Father" David Nitschmann, to distinguish him from other famous David Nitschmanns, he was the father of Anna Nitschmann, second wife of Count Zinzendorf. Tradition has it that Zinzendorf unofficially adopted him as his father.

Nitschmann moved to Herrnhut in 1725. He then traveled to St. Thomas, U.S. Virgin Islands, where he served as a Moravian missionary and where his wife Anna died.

Finally, he moved to the Province of Pennsylvania in North America. Arriving in Nazareth on December 14, 1740, he helped to expand and strengthen that community until March 1741, when he and his nephew, David Nitschmann, began work on building the new community of Bethlehem, Pennsylvania. Joining them in this endeavor were Johann Bühner, Martin Mack, Matthias Seibold, Anton Seiffert, and David Zeisberger. He remained active with this project until January 1747.

He died in Bethlehem on April 14, 1758, and was buried in "God's Acre" cemetery there.

== Legacy ==
Nitschmann is sometimes considered the founder of Bethlehem, but that is not correct, although he was a leading figure in the early days.
