= Daily Watchwords =

Moravian devotional work

The Daily Watchwords (German: Herrnhuter Losungen) is an annual, globally distributed publication of the Moravian Church.

It was started on 3 May 1728, and is now published in 50 languages, making it the oldest and most widely read daily devotional work in the world. The publication is traditionally in the form of a book or booklet, containing a selection of short bible verses, one for each day of a year.

Old Testament texts, the "Watchwords", are chosen by lot annually in Herrnhut from a collection of 1824 verses. New Testament texts, the "Doctrinal Texts", are then selected to comment on the Watchwords. Total annual circulation is over 1.5 million copies.

This is an ecumenical ministry of the worldwide Moravian Unity that transcends confessional, political and racial barriers of all kinds.

The Moravian Daily Texts service of the Moravian Church in North America makes available by email each day's Watchwords.
