= Nicolaus Zinzendorf =

German protestant religious and social reformer, bishop of the Moravian Church

The Right Reverend Nicolaus Ludwig Zinzendorf
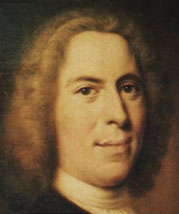
- Portrait of Zinzendorf by Balthasar Denner
- Full name: Nikolaus Ludwig, Reichsgraf von Zinzendorf und Pottendorf
- Born: 26 May 1700; Dresden, Electorate of Saxony, Holy Roman Empire
- Died: 9 May 1760 (aged 59); Herrnhut, Electorate of Saxony, Holy Roman Empire
- Spouses: Erdmuthe Dorothea of Reuss-Ebersdorf; Anna Nitschmann
- Occupation: Bishop of the Moravian Church

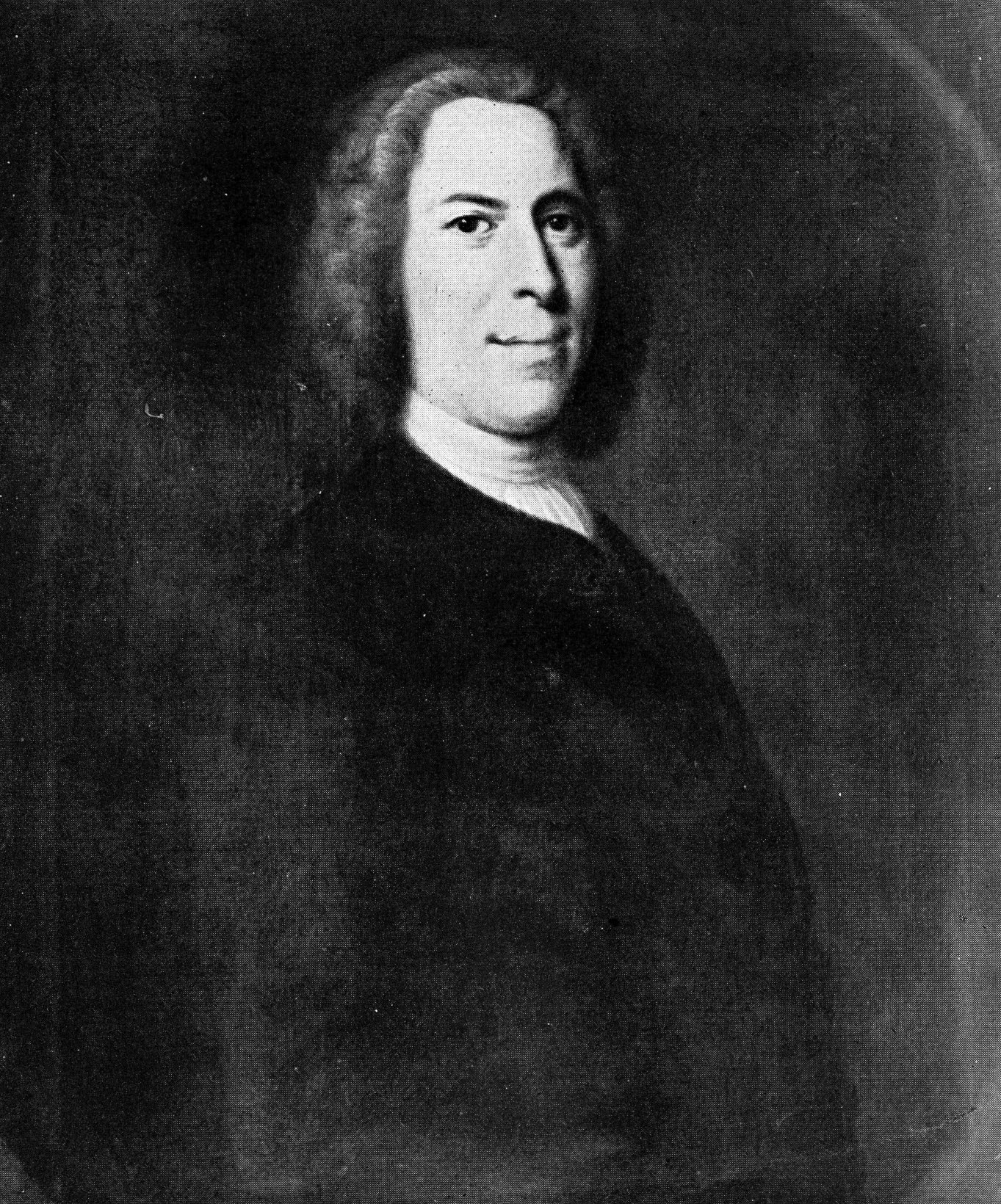
Count Nikolaus Ludwig von Zinzendorf und Pottendorf (1731)

Nikolaus Ludwig, Reichsgraf von Zinzendorf und Pottendorf (26 May 1700 – 9 May 1760) was a German religious and social reformer, bishop of the Moravian Church, founder of the Herrnhuter Brüdergemeine, Christian mission pioneer and a major figure of 18th-century Protestantism. Born in Dresden, Zinzendorf was called Ludwig or Brother Ludwig by his intimates. He was notable for providing shelter for German-speaking Moravian exiles at Herrnhut, an effort that was influenced by Pietist ideas from the Lutheran faith he was brought up in.

Zinzendorf was critical of slavery, and played a role in starting the Protestant mission movement by supporting two determined Moravian missionaries Johann Leonhard Dober and David Nitschmann to go (via Copenhagen) to the Danish colony of Saint Thomas to minister to the enslaved population there (see Moravian slaves). In spite of having Danish royal support from Charlotte Amalie of Denmark, these missionaries faced discouragement in several forms, including by some Moravians at Herrnhut (including Christian David), by the Danish West India Company, by planters in Saint Thomas, by the risk of getting malaria, and by the slaves themselves.

His projects were often misunderstood. In 1736 he was banished from Saxony, but in 1749 the government rescinded its decree and begged him to establish within its jurisdiction more settlements like that at Herrnhut. Zinzendorf's effect on the Moravian Church was significant, and is still evident nearly three centuries later. He is commemorated as a hymnwriter and a renewer of the church by the Evangelical Lutheran Church in America on its Calendar of Saints on 9 May.

== Early life and ancestry ==
Born into one of the most prominent noble families of the region, House of Zinzendorf, Ludwig (sometimes Louis or Lewis) was the only son of Count Georg Ludwig von Zinzendorf und Pottendorf (1662–1700) by his second wife, Baroness Charlotte Justina von Gersdorff (1675–1763), daughter of Nicolaus, Baron von Gersdorff (1629–1702), Governor of the Saxon Upper Lusatia and Henrietta Catharina von Friesen-Roetha. From his father's first marriage to Baroness Maria Elisabeth Teuffel von Gundersdorf (1661–1698), Nicolaus had one half-sister, Countess Susanne Louise von Ortenburg (1690–1709), and one half-brother Count Friedrich Christian (1696–1756), who was the father of Count Karl von Zinzendorf, Governor of Trieste.

== Formative years ==
At age six, young Ludwig would often write love letters to Jesus. He would then climb to the castle tower and toss them out the window, where they scattered around the courtyard like innocent prayers. During the Great Northern War, Swedish soldiers overran Saxony in 1706. They entered the room where young Ludwig just happened to be conducting his customary devotions. The soldiers were incredibly moved by the boy's prayer.

His school days were spent at Franke Foundations at Halle where Pietism was strong, and in 1716, he went to the University of Wittenberg, to study law so as to be ready for a diplomatic career. Three years later, he traveled in the Netherlands, in France, and in various parts of Germany, where he made the personal acquaintance of men distinguished for practical goodness and belonging to a variety of churches. During a visit to an art museum, Zinzendorf was said to have experienced the Holy Spirit upon viewing Ecce Homo by Domencia Feti. Young Zinzendorf was converted, noting: "I have loved Him for a long time, but I have never actually done anything for Him. From now on I will do whatever He leads me to do."

== Religious freedom and discord ==
In 1722, Zinzendorf offered asylum to a number of persecuted wanderers from Moravia and Bohemia (parts of Czech Republic today), and permitted them to build the village of Herrnhut on a corner of his estate of Berthelsdorf. Most of the initial refugees who came to this asylum were recruited by Christian David and came from areas where the early Protestant groups such as the Unitas Fratrum had been dominant prior to the Thirty Years' War. As the village grew it became known as a place of religious freedom, and attracted individuals from a variety of persecuted groups, including the Schwenkfelders. The concentration of differing beliefs in the village produced intense conflict. Personal and religious differences between the estate manager Heitz and Johann Andreas Rothe, the Lutheran pastor of Berthelsdorf, were made more tense by the apocalyptic preaching of Johann Sigismund Krüger.

Zinzendorf began to visit each home for prayer, and finally called the men of the village together for an intense study of the Scriptures. The question they came to focus on was how the Scriptures described Christian life in community. These studies, combined with intense prayer, convinced many of the community that they were called to live together in love, and that the disunity and conflict they had experienced was contrary to the clear calling of Scripture.

== Reconciliation and the Brotherly Agreement ==
Out of this study and prayer, the community formed a document known as the Brüderlicher Vertrag, the Brotherly Agreement, a voluntary discipline of Christian community. This document, and a set of rules laid down by Zinzendorf known as The Manorial Injunctions, were signed by the members of the community on 12 May 1727. This document, which has been revised over many years, is today known as "The Moravian Covenant for Christian Living." The Moravian Church is one of the few denominations that emphasizes a code of Christian behavior over specific creeds.

Continued study and prayer in small groups known as banden resulted in a sense of reconciliation in the community, leading to a powerful spiritual renewal on 13 August 1727 during a special communion service at the Berthelsdorf Church. This experience, referred to as the "Moravian Pentecost," marked the beginning of a new era of spiritual growth in Herrnhut. It also began a period of radical experimentation with communal Christian living as expressed in Zinzendorf's theology.

== Reconnection with early Unitas Fratrum ==
As the renewed community of Herrnhut grew, Zinzendorf obtained a copy of Ratio Disciplinae, the church order of the early Bohemian Unity. As he began to study the history of the Bohemians, he was astonished to find powerful similarities between the theology and practice of the early Unitas Fratrum and the newly established order of Herrnhut. Zinzendorf and the Herrnhuters felt a strong identification with the writings of Moravian Bishop John Amos Comenius and incorporated many of the ideas of the early Unity. However, Zinzendorf saw the new group as a spark for renewal of all denominations, not a new and separate denomination. This theological bent was reinforced by the legal structure of the Lutheran state church.

== New Protestant family order ==
In this renewed community, Zinzendorf was able to organize the people into something similar to a militia Christi, based not on monastic but on family life. However his ideas of family were centered not on a traditional nuclear family of parents and children. Indeed, he wanted to break traditional family bonds by organizing communal families based on age, marital status and gender. The banden, or small groups, continued but were organized into "choirs" based on age, marital status, and gender. Zinzendorf's theology recognized that at each stage of life, we had different spiritual needs and a different relationship with the Savior.

Zinzendorf was consecrated a bishop at Berlin on 20 May 1737 by Bishops David Nitschmann der Bischof and Daniel Ernst Jablonski.

== Missionaries and the Pilgrim Count ==
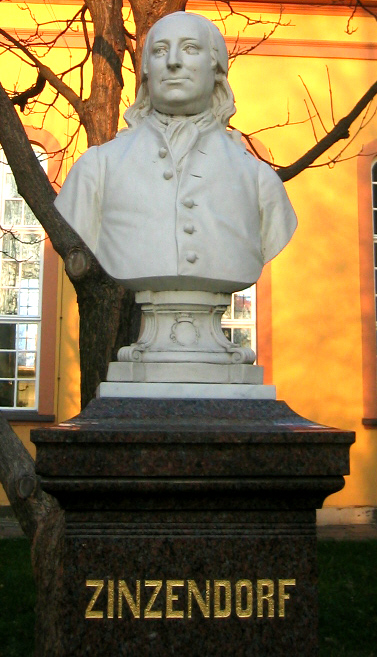
Zinzendorf monument in Herrnhut, Germany

Zinzendorf preaching to people from many nations

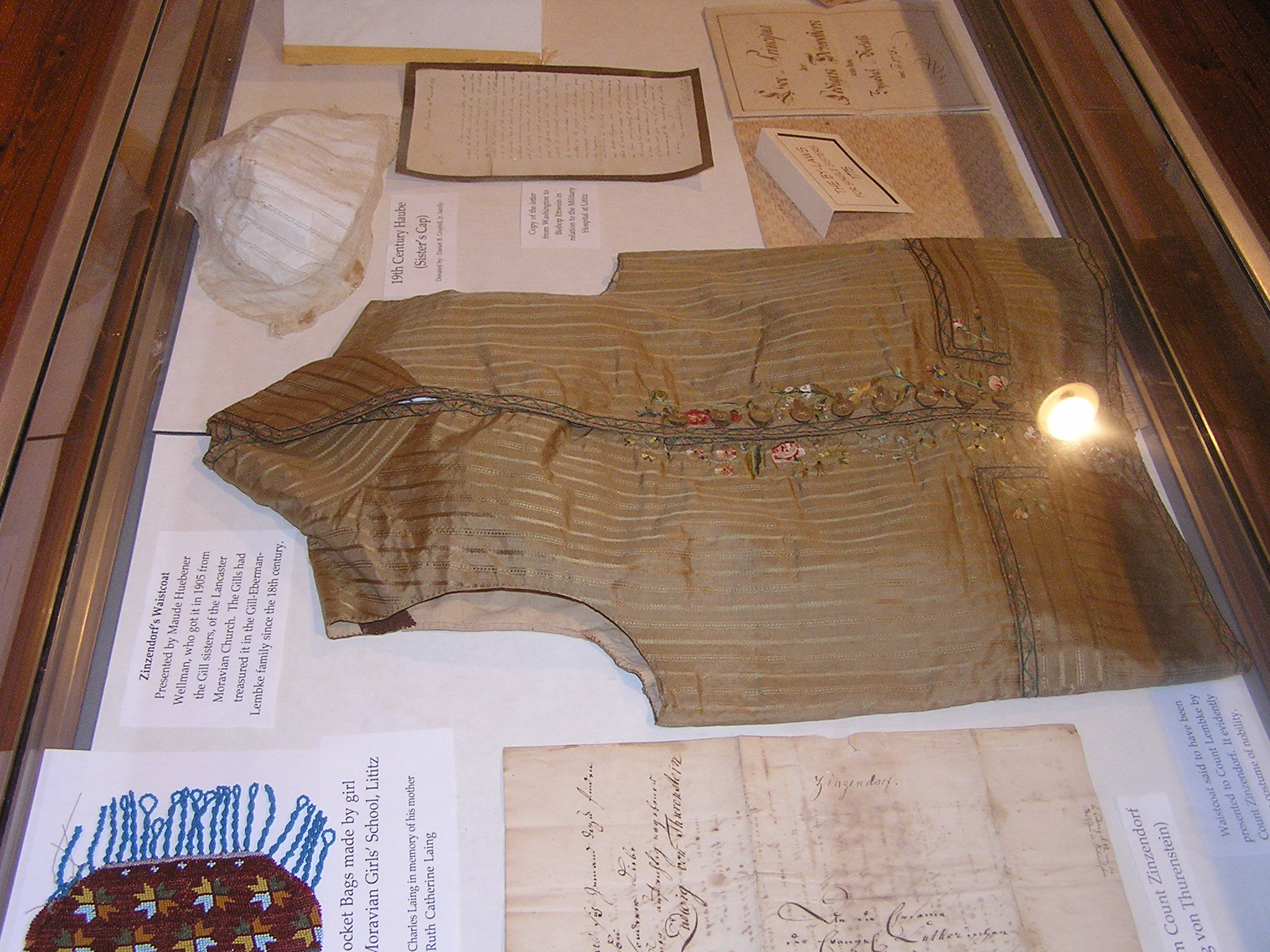
Zinzendorf's waistcoat in Lititz Moravian Archive and Museum

In 1732, the community began sending out missionaries among slaves in the Danish-governed West Indies and the Inuit of Greenland. Zinzendorf's personal and familial relation to the court of Denmark and to King Christian VI facilitated such endeavors. He saw with delight the spread of this Protestant family order in Germany, Denmark, Russia and England.

In 1736, accusations from neighboring nobles and questions of theological unorthodoxy caused Zinzendorf to be exiled from his home in Saxony. He and a number of his followers moved to Marienborn (near Büdingen) and began a period of exile and travel, during which he became known as the "Pilgrim Count."

The missionary work in the West Indies had been hugely controversial in Europe, with many accusing Zinzendorf of simply sending young missionaries off to die. He decided to place himself on the line, and in 1739 left Europe to visit the mission work on St. Thomas. Convinced that he himself might not come back, he preached his "last sermon" and left his will with his wife.

In 1741, Zinzendorf visited Pennsylvania, thus becoming one of the few 18th century European nobles to have actually set foot in the Americas. In addition to visiting leaders in Philadelphia such as Benjamin Franklin, he met with the leaders of the Iroquois and, with the assistance of Conrad Weiser reached agreements for the free movement of Moravian missionaries in the area.

== Theology ==
He taught that the Savior had a relationship with each believer, but a different level of relationship with the Gemeinde. Decisions on interpretation of Scripture were to be made communally, not individually. He believed it was the Gemeinde, not the ecclesiastical and political institution, that was truly the Church of Jesus Christ.

His famous preaching of the redemption through the blood of Christ, followed a change of opinion around 1734/35, the years before it was suspected he had adhered to the opposite doctrines of Johann Conrad Dippel.

Nicolaus Zinzendorf taught that "We are sanctified wholly the moment we are justified, and are neither more nor less holy to the day of our death; entire sanctification and justification being in one and the same instant."

More scandalously, he had his secret or half-public doctrines, most notably of the "Holy marriage" or "Marriage-Sacrament". In his first big song-book, "Sammlung Geist- und lieblicher Lieder", Herrnhut 1731, in the preface p. 16, he states a holy marriage is a sacrament together with the baptism and Lord's Supper. This means that man and wife who live in such a marriage are sinless. The doctrines of this were especially given out to the married couples of the congregation in the count's speeches, notably in his 1747 edited: "Oeffentliche Gemeinreden", 2. Vols., and in the 1755 at Frankfurt and Leipzig published (by a local Saxon clergyman who had got hold of the manuscript): "Haupt-Schlüssel zum herrnhutischen Ehe-Sacrament". From 1735 on, in public writings, Z. expressly declared himself for the lutheran confession of Augsburg, but in private letters he declared indifference to any confession; that is, the Catholic, Reformed and Lutheran churches as "sects" called, that is an adherence to Jesus Christ without any doctrine, and finally his own church as the center of this, and including threats to those who would oppose him. In a letter to some separatists outside Frankfurt M, of 16. June 1736 he states: "Wir haben Lust, Seelen zu JEsu zu bereden, in allen Secten und Verfassungen. Denn wir machen keine neue, sondern leben in JESU gemein, die allenthalben nur eine ist. Will man uns dieses in Liebe lassen, so so lassen wir wieder stehen, was wir nicht gebauet. Wil man uns aber darinnen stören; so werden wir uns mit dem Schwerdt des Geistes zur Rechten und zur Lincken Platz machen. (We have desire, to prepare souls to Jesus, in all sects and constitutions. Then we make no new ones, but live in the congregation of Jesus, which everywhere only one is. Would one let this in love, so will we leave standing, what we did not build. But if one will disturb this; so will we right and left make place with the sword of spirit.)" Such utterances carried the double appearance of theological toleration and dictatorship. Which Jesus he is referring to, is also unclear, because it is a Jesus without certain content. The theology that emerged from all the controversies, was a ceremonial, liturgical one. An original English account (from Z. visit in North America) of Count Z. opinions can be found in: Gilbert Tennent: "Some account of the Principles of the Moravians", London 1743.

== Music ==
Zinzendorf wrote music often. Many of his pieces are preserved into the modern day and can still be performed. many of his words have also been adapted by other composers into musical pieces.

== Declining years ==
By 1741 his daughter, Maria Theresa, had died and he decided to adopt a replacement. He chose an heiress, Mary Stonehouse, whom he renamed Maria Theresa. She had been married for two years to an estranged Anglican vicar. She joined the Moravian church in 1742 and served as a worker as a patron and deaconess within his household. Her husband had a more difficult relationship with the church.

A financial board was established among the Brethren, on a plan furnished by lawyer John Frederick Köber, which worked well. His son Christian Renatus, whom Zinzendorf had hoped to make his successor, died in 1752 of tuberculosis.

== Works ==
He wrote a large number of hymns, of which the best-known is "Jesus, Thy blood and righteousness".

== See also ==
- Ronneburg, Hesse
