= Kauerdluksoak Bay =

Bay in Labrador

- Location within Newfoundland and Labrador
- Coordinates: 58.159112°N 62.632370°W
- Max. length: 40 miles (64 km)
- Max. width: 2 miles (3.2 km)

Kauerdluksoak Bay

Kauerdluksoak Bay is a long narrow inlet or bay in Labrador at 58.159112°N 62.632370°W. From its head to the sea it is about 40 miles (64 km) long.

At its mouth is the site of the former Hebron mission station.
