= Johann Leonhard Dober =

German missionary (1706–1766)

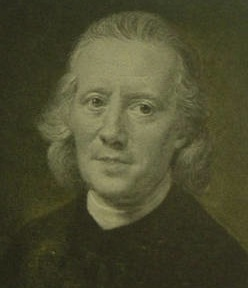
Johann Leonhard Dober (1706-1766)

Johann Leonhard Dober (born March 7, 1706, Mönchsroth, Swabia, Germany to Johann Dober and Anna Barbara Link; died April 1, 1766, Herrnhut, Saxony, Germany) was, along with David Nitschmann, one of the two first missionaries of the Moravian Brethren (Herrnhuter Brüdergemeine) in the West Indies in 1732.

== Early Years in Germany ==
Dober learned the trade of pottery from his father. He was converted at age 17 while visiting the Moravian church at Herrnhut. On July 24, 1731, he heard a talk given by Count Nikolaus Ludwig Zinzendorf about missions to the slaves of the Caribbean. In his talk, Zinzendorf described a former slave from the Danish island of St. Thomas named Anthony Ulrich, who believed that the slaves would be very receptive to Christian missionaries. Dober, along with his friend Tobias Leupold, felt called to go to the Caribbean, and they began to prepare for this work. Although they initially met with opposition from the Moravian Brethren, the doubts were eventually settled by drawing lots. Dober's lot read, "Let the lad go, for the Lord is with him," but Leupold's said that he must wait. Instead, David Nitschmann was chosen to go with Dober to help start the Caribbean mission.

== Mission in St. Thomas ==
On August 20, 1732, Count Zinzendorf blessed the two young men, and after a prayer meeting sent them on to Copenhagen, where they were to find a ship bound for St. Thomas. In Copenhagen, they again met with opposition to their plans. Even Anthony Ulrich, who had originally proposed the idea, began to have second thoughts. Von Plesz, the King's Chamberlain, asked them how they would live.

“We shall work,” replied Nitschmann, “as slaves among the slaves.”

“But,” said Von Plesz, “that is impossible. It will not be allowed. No white man ever works as a slave.”

“Very well,” replied Nitschmann, “I am a carpenter, and will ply my trade.”

“But what will the potter do?”

“He will help me in my work.”

“If you go on like that,” exclaimed the Chamberlain, “you will stand your ground the wide world over.”

Although the Danish West Indian Company refused to grant them passage, the two men eventually found sympathy at the Danish court, and with the help of a court officer they obtained berths on a ship bound for the West Indies. Leaving Copenhagen on Oct 8, 1732, they arrived in St. Thomas two months later on December 13. While in St. Thomas, they lived frugally and preached to the slaves, and they had a certain amount of success. Dober returned to Germany in 1734 (David Nitschmann had only gone to help Dober get settled and had left after only a few weeks), but other Moravian missionaries continued the work for fifty years afterward, establishing churches on St. Thomas, St. Croix, St. John's, Jamaica, Antigua, Barbados, and St. Kitts. Moravian missionaries baptized 13,000 converts before any other missionaries arrived on the scene.

== Later years ==
Dober returned to Europe since he had been chosen to serve as Chief Elder of the Moravian Brethren. As the work began to spread across the world, he realized that he could not do the job any more and it was his 1741 offer to resign that occasioned the Moravian Unity's realization that Jesus Christ is the only Head and Chief Elder of the Church. He married Anna Schindler on July 13, 1738, but she died during childbirth on December 12, 1739. In 1743 he remarried, this time to Anna Gertrude Engel. Thereafter he was consecrated a bishop, and served in Livonia from 1745. Throughout this period he made several trips to England, Holland, and Silesia. After Count Zinzendorf died in 1760, he returned to Herrnhut, where he served on the directing board of the Moravian Brethren and spent his last years. He died on April 1, 1766, and was buried in God's Acre, the community's graveyard on the Hutberg Hill in Herrnhut, Saxony, Germany.

== The Story of the Moravian Slaves ==
A popular misconception is that Dober and Nitschmann sold themselves into slavery in order to gain access to the African slaves of St. Thomas. In fact, although they expressed willingness to do this, white slavery was not allowed in any of the West Indian islands, so they plied their individual trades to support themselves. However, there is a story preserved by Bonnie Bartonin her book The Bow in the Cloud: or, The Negro's Memorial (1834) about Leonard Dober where she says,

About this time, meeting with some pious companions of Count Zinzendorff, who had arrived at the court of Denmark to attend the coronation of Christian VI., Anthony broke his mind to them, saying, " Oh ! that some one would go and preach the gospel to my sister in St. Thomas!" .... In the course of a few weeks the negro, Anthony, himself arrived at Hermhut, and confirmed, at a public meeting there, all that he had stated at Copenhagen, respecting the wants and the willingness of his ignorant and oppressed countrymen in St. Thomas, to receive the gospel: but, he added, so long and so severely were they worked by their masters, that, unless those who went to preach to them would consent to become slaves themselves, and labour with the negroes in the plantations, they would have little opportunity of communicating divine instruction to them. This intelligence did not in the smallest degree daunt the devoted young men; they were both ready, not only to be bound, but to die for the Lord Jesus. Such indeed was the simplicity of purpose, singleness of heart, and strength of faith, by which they were actuated, that they were willing to make any sacrifice which might be required, if they could win but one soul to Christ, — nay, if they might but have the opportunity of carrying the news of salvation to Anthony's sister, — a poor despised female slave. The Bow in the Cloud: or, The Negro's Memorial Bonnie Bartonin p. 5-6 (Leonard Dober)
