= David Nitschmann der Syndikus =

Czech-born Moravian missionary (1703–1779)

David Nitschmann der Syndikus (David Nitschmann the Syndic; September 20, 1703 in Zauchtenthal/Suchdol nad Odrou – March 28, 1779 in Zeist) was a Czech-born Moravian missionary.

He went to the East Indies and served briefly as a missionary in Sri Lanka. He was forced to leave because of political difficulties.

He became a leading member of the executive boards of the Herrnhuter or Moravian Brethren and often led negotiations with governments, hence his title "Syndicus".

His son was Christian David Nitschmann.
