= Anna Nitschmann =

Moravian Brethren missionary and poet

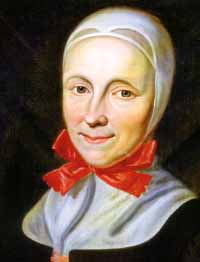
Anna Nitschmann

Anna Caritas Nitschmann, Countess von Zinzendorf und Pottendorf, (24 November 1715 – 21 May 1760) was a Moravian Brethren missionary (Missionarin), lyrical poet, and the second wife of Count Nicolaus Ludwig Zinzendorf. By virtue of her marriage, she became a member of the House of Zinzendorf, one of the most prominent noble families in the region.

== Biography ==
Anna Nitschmann was born on 24 November 1715 in Kunín, Moravia. She was born the younger daughter of David Nitschmann (1676–1758) and his wife, Anna Schneider (1680–1735); her father was a Moravian confessor and the family fled from persecution when she was ten years old; she served as the Chief Eldress of the Renewed Moravian Church for most of her life, from the age of 14. Her duties as Chief Eldress were to serve as a spiritual mentor and counsellor to the female members of the congregations. She also wrote several hymns.

Most of her life was spent in close connection with the Zinzendorf household, although in 1740 she travelled to America with Johanna Sophia Molther to carry out itinerant mission work among the women of southeastern Pennsylvania. She then returned to Europe to resume her work among the various Moravian congregations. After the death of Zinzendorf's first wife, she was married to him on 27 June 1757, but both of them died within a couple of years. Anna Nitschmann died on 21 May 1760 in Herrnhut, Lusatia and is buried there.

== Legacy ==
The Moravian University has a dormhouse named after her.
