= Moravian Church =

Protestant Christian denomination dating back to the 15th century

Unity of the Brethren
- Latin: Unitas Fratrum
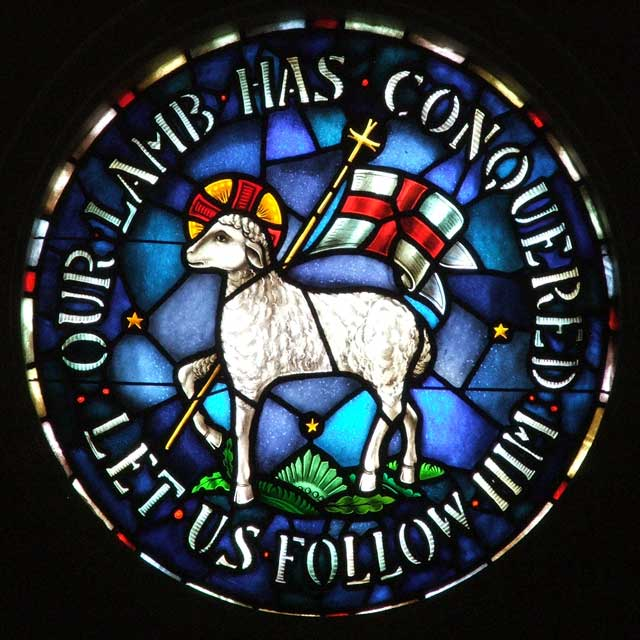
- A stained-glass emblem of Agnus Dei at Trinity Moravian Church in Winston-Salem, North Carolina
- Classification: Proto-Protestant
- Orientation: Hussite (Bohemian) with Pietist Lutheran influences
- Associations: Christian Churches Together
- Founder: Followers of Jan Hus and Petr Chelčický; later renewed by Nicolaus Ludwig Zinzendorf, Christian David and David Nitschmann
- Origin: 1457 (569 years ago); 1722 (304 years ago); Bohemia; Herrnhut
- Congregations: 1,000+
- Number of followers: 1,112,120 (2016)
- Official website: unitasfratrum.org

The Moravian Church, or the Moravian Brethren, formally the Unitas Fratrum (Latin for 'Unity of the Brethren'), is one of the oldest Protestant denominations in Christianity, dating back to the Bohemian Reformation of the 15th century and the original Unity of the Brethren (Czech: Jednota bratrská) founded in the Kingdom of Bohemia, sixty years before Martin Luther's Reformation.

The church's heritage can be traced to 1457 and the Lands of the Bohemian Crown, which included Bohemia, Moravia, Silesia, and previously the Hussite movement against several practices and doctrines of the Catholic Church. Its name is derived from exiles who fled from Moravia to Saxony in 1722 to escape the Counter-Reformation, establishing the Christian community of Herrnhut. Hence, it is also known in German as the Herrnhuter Brüdergemeine [sic] ("Unity of Brethren of Herrnhut").

The modern Unitas Fratrum has about one million members worldwide, continuing their tradition of missionary work, such as in the Americas and Africa, which is reflected in their broad global distribution. The Moravian Church is part of historic evangelicalism. Moravians continue many of the same practices established in the 18th century, including placing a high value on a personal conversion to Christ, called the New Birth, and piety, good works, evangelism (including the establishment of missions), nonresistance, ecumenism, and music. The Moravian Church's emblem is the Lamb of God (Agnus Dei) with the flag of victory, surrounded by the Latin inscription "Vicit agnus noster, eum sequamur" ('Our Lamb has conquered; let us follow Him').

Apart from the Moravian Church, the more conservative Unity of the Brethren, based in Texas, as well as the Czechoslovak Hussite Church, based in the Czech Republic and Slovakia, are denominations in the same Hussite-Moravian theological tradition.

== History ==
=== Jan Hus and the Bohemian Reformation ===
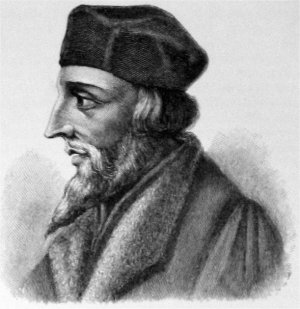
Jan Hus

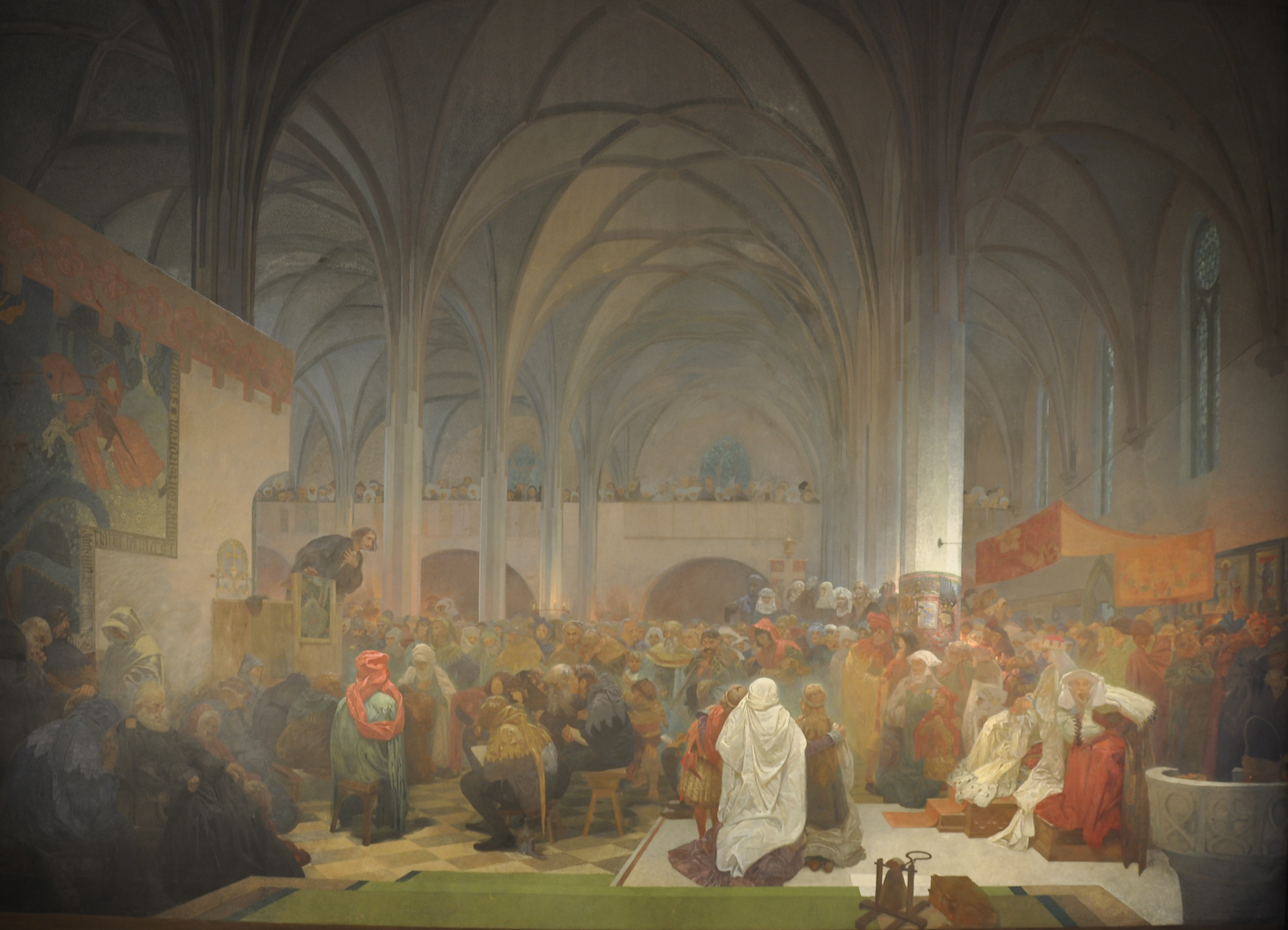
Jan Hus Preaching at Bethlehem Chapel in Prague, a 1916 portrait by Alfons Mucha

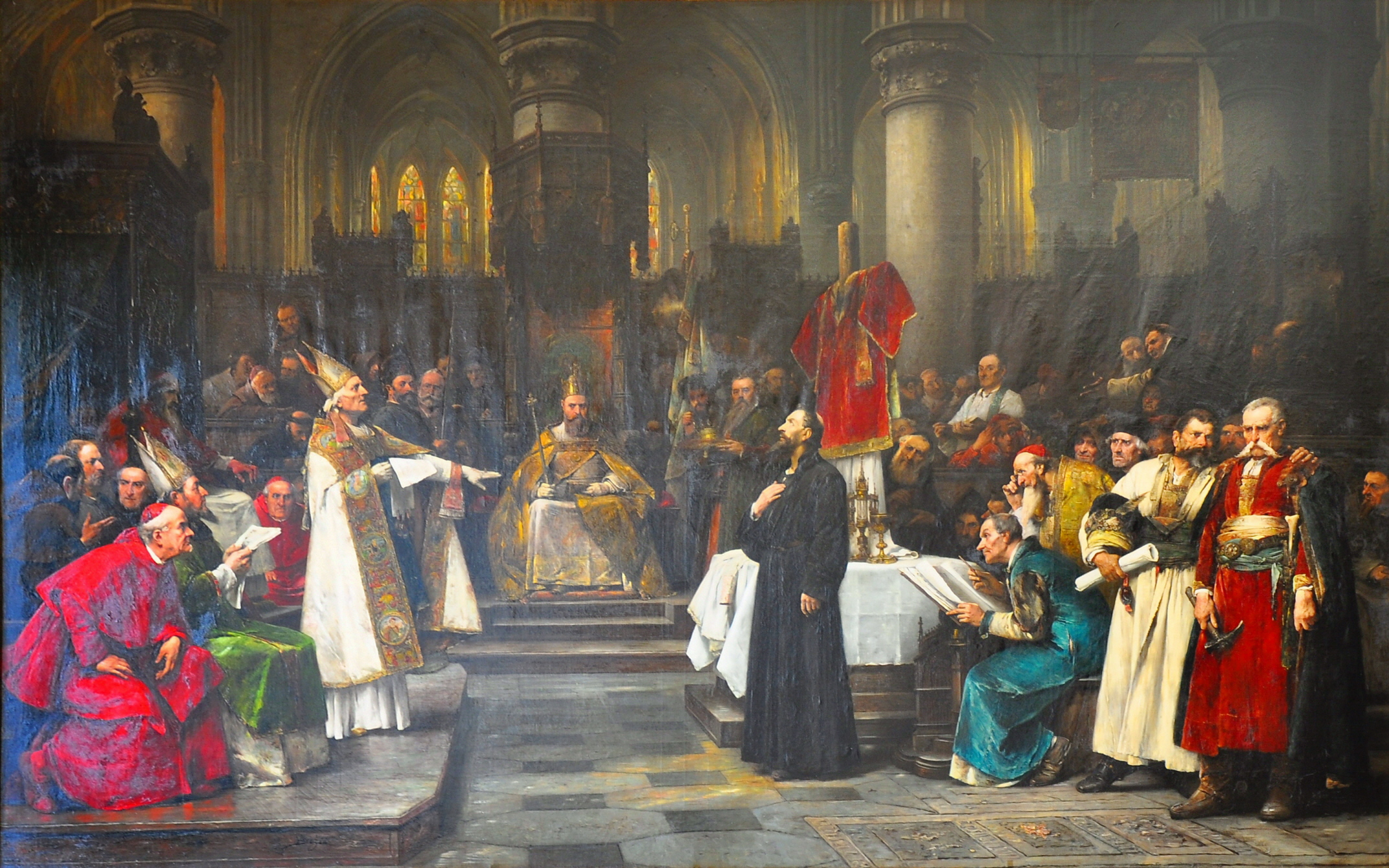
Jan Hus at the Council of Constance, a portrait by Václav Brožík

The Hussite movement that was to become the Moravian Church was started by Jan Hus (English: John Huss) in early 15th-century Bohemia, in what is today the Czech Republic. Hus objected to some of the practices and doctrines of the Roman Catholic Church. Specifically, he wanted the liturgy to be celebrated in Czech, priests to be able to marry, and indulgences and the idea of Purgatory eliminated. Since these actions predate the Protestant Reformation by a century, some historians claim the Moravian Church was the first Protestant church.

The movement gained support from the Crown of Bohemia. However, Hus was summoned to attend the Council of Constance, which decided that he was a heretic. Hus was released to the secular authority, which sentenced him to be burned at the stake on 6 July 1415. From 1419 to 1437 were a series of Hussite Wars, initially between various Roman Catholic rulers and the Hussites. Then there was a Hussite civil war, between the more compromising Utraquists and the radical Taborites. In 1434, an army of Utraquists and Roman Catholics defeated the Taborites at the Battle of Lipany. The Utraquists signed the Compacts of Basel on 5 July 1436.

Within 50 years of Hus's death, a contingent of his followers had become independently organised as the "Bohemian Brethren" (Čeští bratři) or Unity of the Brethren (Jednota bratrská), which was founded in Kunvald, Bohemia, in 1457. A brother known as Gregory the Patriarch was very influential in forming the group, as well as the teachings of Peter Chelcicky. This group held to a strict obedience to the Sermon on the Mount, which included non-swearing of oaths, non-resistance, and not accumulating wealth. Because of this, they considered themselves separate from the majority Hussites that did not hold those teachings. They received episcopal ordination through the Waldensians in 1467.

These were some of the earliest Protestants, rebelling against Rome some fifty years before Martin Luther. By the middle of the 16th century, as many as 90 percent of the subjects of the Bohemian Crown were Protestant. The majority of the nobility was Protestant, and the schools and printing-shops established by the Moravian Church were flourishing.

Protestantism had a strong influence in the education of the population. Even in the middle of the 16th century there was not a single town without a Protestant school in the Bohemian Crown Lands. Many had more than one, mostly with two to six teachers each. In Jihlava, a principal Protestant centre in Moravia, there were five major schools: two German, one Czech, one for girls and one teaching in Latin, which was at the level of a high/grammar school, lecturing on Latin, Greek and Hebrew, Rhetorics, Dialectics, fundamentals of Philosophy and fine arts, as well as religion according to the Lutheran Augustana.

=== Counter-Reformation ===
With the University of Prague also firmly in hands of Protestants, the local Roman Catholic Church was unable to compete in the field of education. The Jesuits were invited, with the backing of the Catholic Habsburg rulers, to come to the Lands of the Bohemian Crown and establish a number of Roman Catholic educational institutions. One of these was the university in the Moravian capital of Olomouc. In 1582, they forced the closure of local Protestant schools.

In 1617, Emperor Matthias had his fiercely Roman Catholic brother Ferdinand of Styria elected as King of Bohemia. In the year that followed, Protestant Bohemian noblemen, in fear of losing their religious freedom, instigated a revolt with the unplanned Defenestrations of Prague. The Protestants were defeated in 1620 in the Battle of White Mountain near Prague, known as the first battle in the Thirty Years' War. As a consequence, the local Protestant noblemen were either executed or expelled from the country, while the Habsburgs placed Roman Catholic, and mostly German-speaking nobility in their place. The war, plague, and subsequent disruption led to a decline in the population from over 3 million to some 800,000 people. By 1622, the entire education system was in the hands of Jesuits, and all Protestant schools were closed.

The Brethren were forced to go underground, and eventually dispersed across Northern Europe as far as the Low Countries, where their bishop, John Amos Comenius, attempted to direct a resurgence. The largest remaining communities of the Brethren were located in Leszno (German: Lissa) in Poland, which had historically strong ties with the Czechs, and small, isolated groups in Moravia. The latter are referred to as "the Hidden Seed", which John Amos Comenius had prayed would preserve the evangelical faith in the land of the fathers.

In addition to the Renewed Unitas Fratrum or Moravian Church, which preserves the Unitas Fratrum's three orders of episcopal ordination, the Evangelical Church of Czech Brethren and the Czechoslovak Hussite Church also continue the Hussite tradition in the Czech Republic and Slovakia today, as with the Unity of the Brethren in the United States; these are denominations in the same Hussite-Moravian theological tradition. They only account for 0.8% of the Czech population, which is 79.4% non-religious, and 10.4% Catholic.

=== Herrnhuter Brüdergemeine, 18th-century renewal ===
Nicolaus Ludwig Zinzendorf preaching to people from many nations

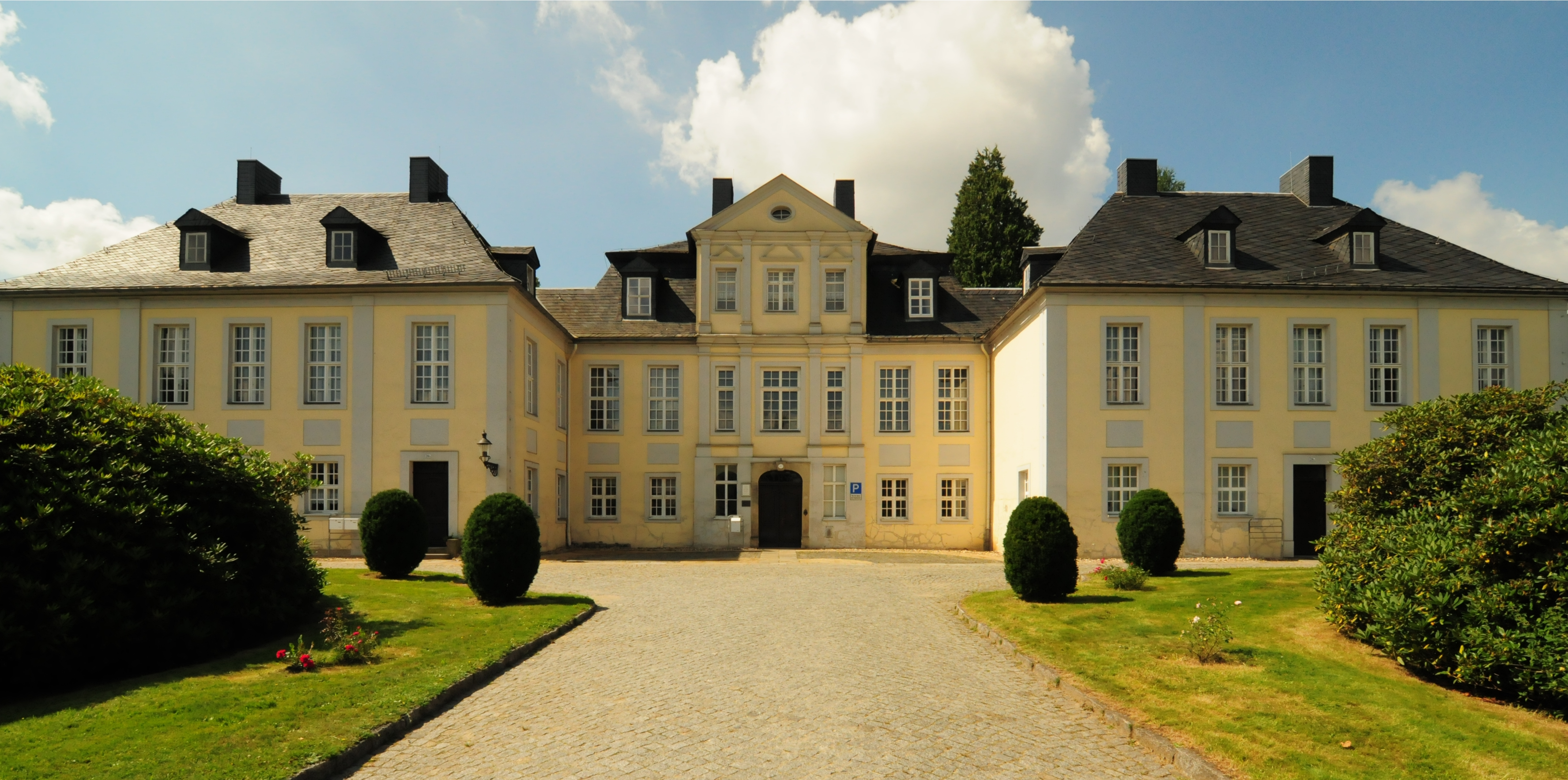
Vogtshof in Herrnhut, the administrative centre of the worldwide Moravian Church

In 1722, a small group of the Bohemian Brethren, the "Hidden Seed", who had been living in northern Moravia, as an illegal underground remnant surviving in the Catholic setting of the Habsburg Empire for nearly 100 years, arrived at the Berthelsdorf estate of Nikolaus Ludwig von Zinzendorf in present-day Saxony in the eastern part of present-day Germany. Out of a personal commitment to helping the poor and needy, von Zinzendorf, a nobleman who had been brought up in the traditions of Pietistic Lutheranism, agreed to a request from their leader, Christian David, an itinerant carpenter, that they be allowed to settle on his lands in Upper Lusatia in Saxony. The Margraviates of Upper and Lower Lusatia were governed in personal union by the Saxon rulers and enjoyed great autonomy, especially in religious questions.

The refugees established a new village called Herrnhut, about 2 miles (3 km) from Berthelsdorf. The town initially grew steadily, but major religious disagreements emerged and by 1727 the community was divided into factions. Count Zinzendorf worked to bring about unity in the town, and the Brotherly Agreement was adopted by the community on 12 May 1727. This is considered the beginning of the renewal. On 13 August 1727, the community underwent a dramatic transformation when the inhabitants of Herrnhut "learned to love one another", following an experience that they attributed to a visitation of the Holy Spirit, similar to that recorded in the Bible on the day of Pentecost.

Herrnhut grew rapidly following this transforming revival and became the centre of a major movement for Christian renewal and mission during the 18th century. The episcopal ordination of the Ancient Unitas Fratrum was transferred in 1735 to the Renewed Unitas Fratrum by the Unity's two surviving bishops, Daniel Ernst Jablonski and Christian Sitkovius. The carpenter David Nitschmann and, later, Count von Zinzendorf, were the first two bishops of the Renewed Unity. In 1756, Zinzendorf founded a Brüdergemeine that still exists today in Neuwied on the Rhine. Moravian historians identify the main achievements of this period as:

- Setting up a watch of continuous prayer that ran uninterrupted, 24 hours a day, for 100 years.
- Originating the Daily Watchwords.
- Establishing more than 30 settlements internationally on the Herrnhut model, which emphasized prayer and worship, and a form of communal living in which simplicity of lifestyle and generosity with wealth were held to be important spiritual attributes. The purpose of these communities was to assist the members resident there in the sanctification of their lives, to provide a meeting place for Christians from different confessional backgrounds, to provide Christian training for their own children and the children of their friends and supporters and to provide support for the Moravian Mission work throughout the world. As a result, although personal property was held, divisions between social groups and extremes of wealth and poverty were largely eliminated.
- Being the first Protestant church body to begin missionary work.
- Forming many hundreds of small renewal groups operating within the existing churches of Europe, known as "diaspora societies." These groups encouraged personal prayer and worship, Bible study, confession of sins and mutual accountability.

The Moravians arrived in England in 1728, "basking in the warm glow of a revival that had taken place on Count Nikolaus Zinzendorf's estate at Herrnhut in Saxony the previous year, who provided the most attractive and compelling form of heart religion." The Fetter Lane Society of the Moravian Church introduced its evangelical theology to the Anglican priests John Wesley and Charles Wesley; members of the Holy Club (which sprung up the Methodist movement) learned from the Moravians "the nature of genuine saving faith, which began a process by which many of them moved towards more decided evangelical convictions". In the 18th century, the Evangelical Revival came to be led by three different groups: the Wesleyan Methodists, the Calvinistic Methodists, and the Moravians. These three evangelical groups, in 1739, saw the Fetter Lane Society as the hub of the Evangelical Revival.

=== Missions ===
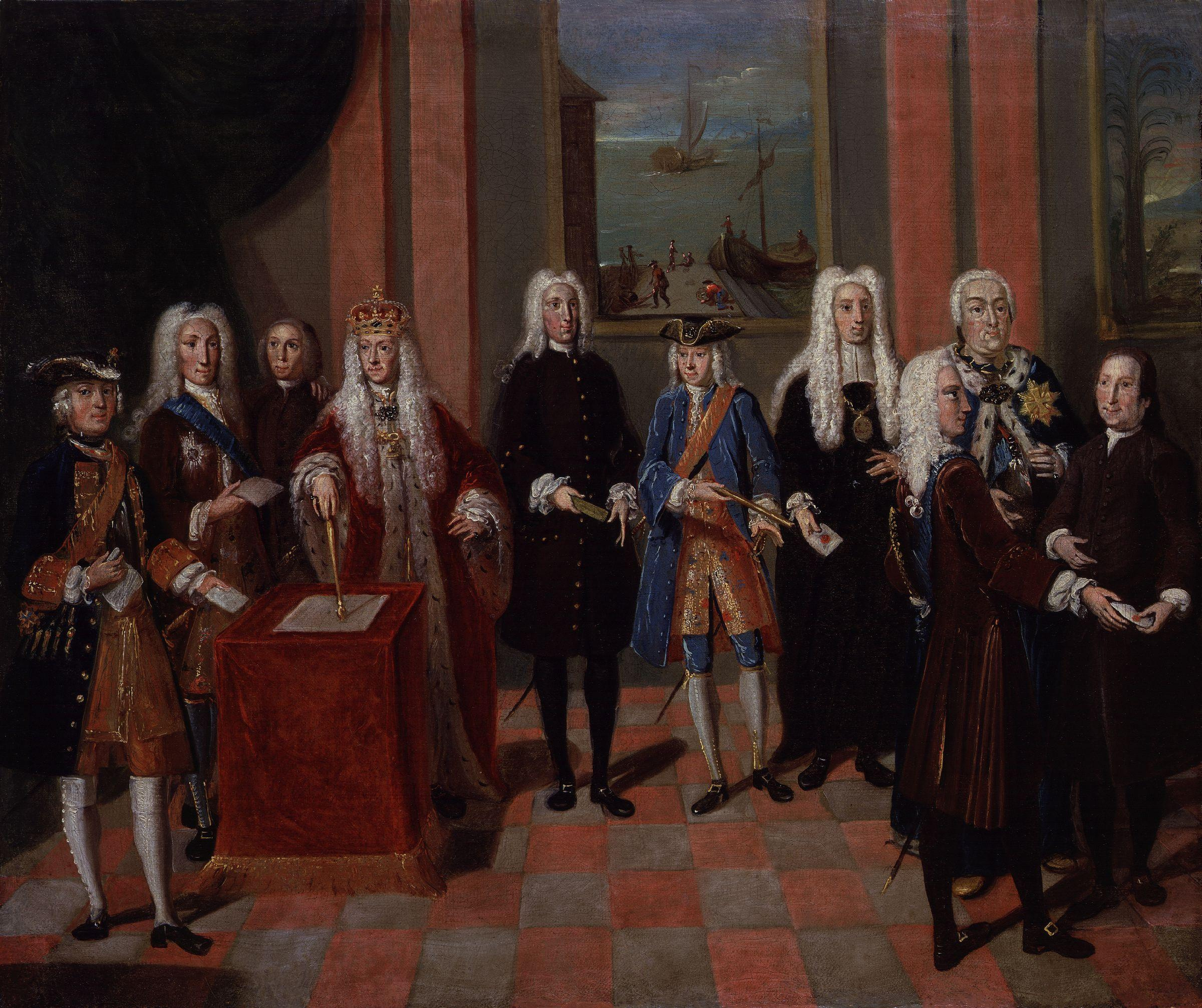
A group of Moravian Church members with George II, depicted in a portrait by Johann Valentin Haidt, c. 1752–1754

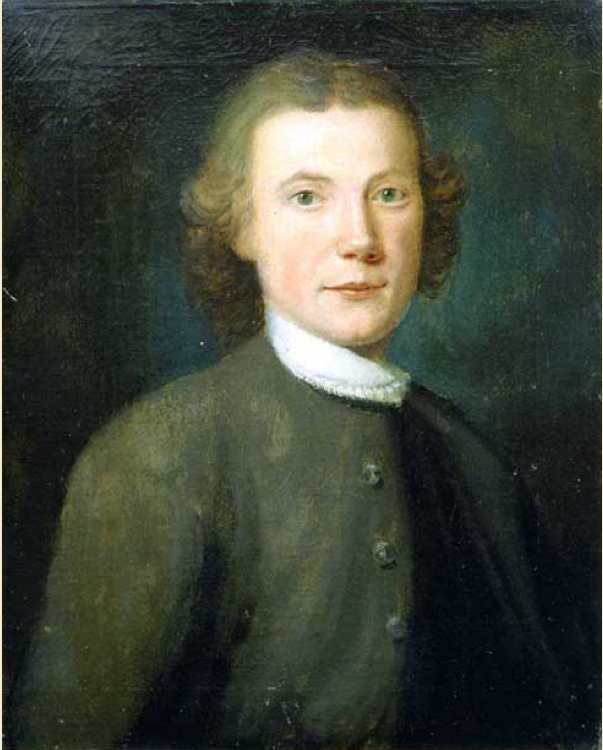
In 1772, John Ettwein and his group of some 200 Lenape and Mohican Christians traveled west along The Great Shamokin Path from their village of Friedenshütten (Cabins of Peace) near modern Wyalusing on the North Branch Susquehanna River to their new village of Friedensstadt (City of Peace)] on the Beaver River in southwestern Pennsylvania.

Along with the Royal Danish Mission College, the Moravian missionaries were the first large-scale Protestant missionary movement. They sent out the first missionaries when there were only 300 inhabitants in Herrnhut. Within 30 years, the church sent hundreds of Christian missionaries to many parts of the world, including the Caribbean, North and South America, the Arctic, Africa, and the Far East. They were the first to send lay people as missionaries, the first Protestant denomination to minister to slaves, though some communities also owned slaves, and the first Protestant presence in many countries.

Owing to Zinzendorf's personal contacts with their royalty, the first Moravian missions were directed to the Dano-Norwegian Empire. While attending the coronation of Christian VI of Denmark-Norway in 1730, Zinzendorf was profoundly struck by two Inuit converts of Hans Egede's mission in Greenland and also by an African from the West Indies. The first Moravian mission was established on the Caribbean island of Saint Thomas in 1732 by a potter named Johann Leonhard Dober and a carpenter named David Nitschmann, who later became the first bishop of the Renewed Unity in 1735. Matthaeus Stach and two others founded the first Moravian mission in Greenland in 1733 at Neu-Herrnhut on Baal's River, which became the nucleus of the modern capital Nuuk.

Moravians also founded missions with the Mohicans, an Algonquian-speaking tribe in the colony of New York in the Thirteen Colonies. In one instance, they founded a mission in 1740 at the Mohican village of Shekomeko in present-day Dutchess County, New York. The converted Mohican people formed the first native Christian congregation in the present-day United States of America. Because of local hostility from New Yorkers to the Mohicans, the Moravian support of the Mohicans led to rumors of them being secret Jesuits, trying to ally the Mohicans with France in the ongoing French and Indian Wars.

Although supporters defended their work, at the end of 1744, the colonial government based in Poughkeepsie, New York, expelled the Moravians from the Province of New York.

In 1741, David Nitschmann and Count Zinzendorf led a small community to found a mission in the colony of Pennsylvania. The mission was established on Christmas Eve, and was named Bethlehem, after the Biblical town in Judea. There, they ministered to the Algonquian-speaking Lenape. Bethlehem, Pennsylvania, is today the seventh-largest city in Pennsylvania, having developed as a major industrial city in the 19th and 20th centuries. In 1772, the first European-Native American settlement of what later became Punxsutawney, Pennsylvania, occurred when Reverend John Ettwein, a Moravian missionary, arrived there with a band of 241 Christianized Lenape.

In 1771, Moravians established a settlement at Nain, Labrador, which became a permanent settlement and the Moravian headquarters in Labrador. The mission stations expanded to Okak (1776), Hopedale (1782), Hebron at Kauerdluksoak Bay (1830–1959), serving also Napartok Bay and Saeglek Bay, Zoar (1864–1889), Ramah (1871–1908), Makkovik (1896), and Killiniq on Cape Chidley island (1905–1925). Two further stations were added after this period at Happy Valley near Goose Bay (1957) and North West River (1960).

Colonies were founded in North Carolina, where Moravians led by Bishop August Gottlieb Spangenberg purchased 98,985 acres (40,058 ha) from John Carteret, 2nd Earl Granville. This large tract of land was named die Wachau, or Wachovia, after one of Zinzendorf's ancestral estates on the Danube River in Lower Austria. Other early settlements included Bethabara (1753), Bethania (1759), and Salem, now referred to as Old Salem (1766) in Winston-Salem, North Carolina.

In 1801, the Moravians established Springplace mission to the Cherokee Nation in what is now Murray County, Georgia. Coinciding with the forced removal of the Cherokees to Oklahoma, this mission was replaced in 1842 by New Springplace in Oaks, Oklahoma. Due to Civil War-related violence, New Springplace closed in 1862 and resumed during the 1870s. In 1898, the Moravian Church discontinued their missionary engagement with the Cherokees and New Springplace, now the Oaks Indian Mission, was transferred to the Danish Evangelical Lutheran Church.

The start of far-flung missionary work necessitated the establishment of independently administered provinces. So, from about 1732, the history of the church becomes the history of its provinces.

Eventually, the Moravian missions in Australia and Greenland were transferred to the local Presbyterian and Lutheran Churches, respectively.

The first mission station in present-day South Africa was established by the Moravian Georg Schmidt at Genadendal in 1738. The mission at Wupperthal, established by the Rhenish Missionary Society, was eventually transferred to the Moravian Church. From 1792 onwards, the Church sent missonaries to evangelise among the Khoikhoi.

The Moravians sought to unify the converts into "one people" living together with the same religious beliefs. Zeisberger, a significant Moravian missionary, implored the converts to remember that they were "one people not two."

== Present ==
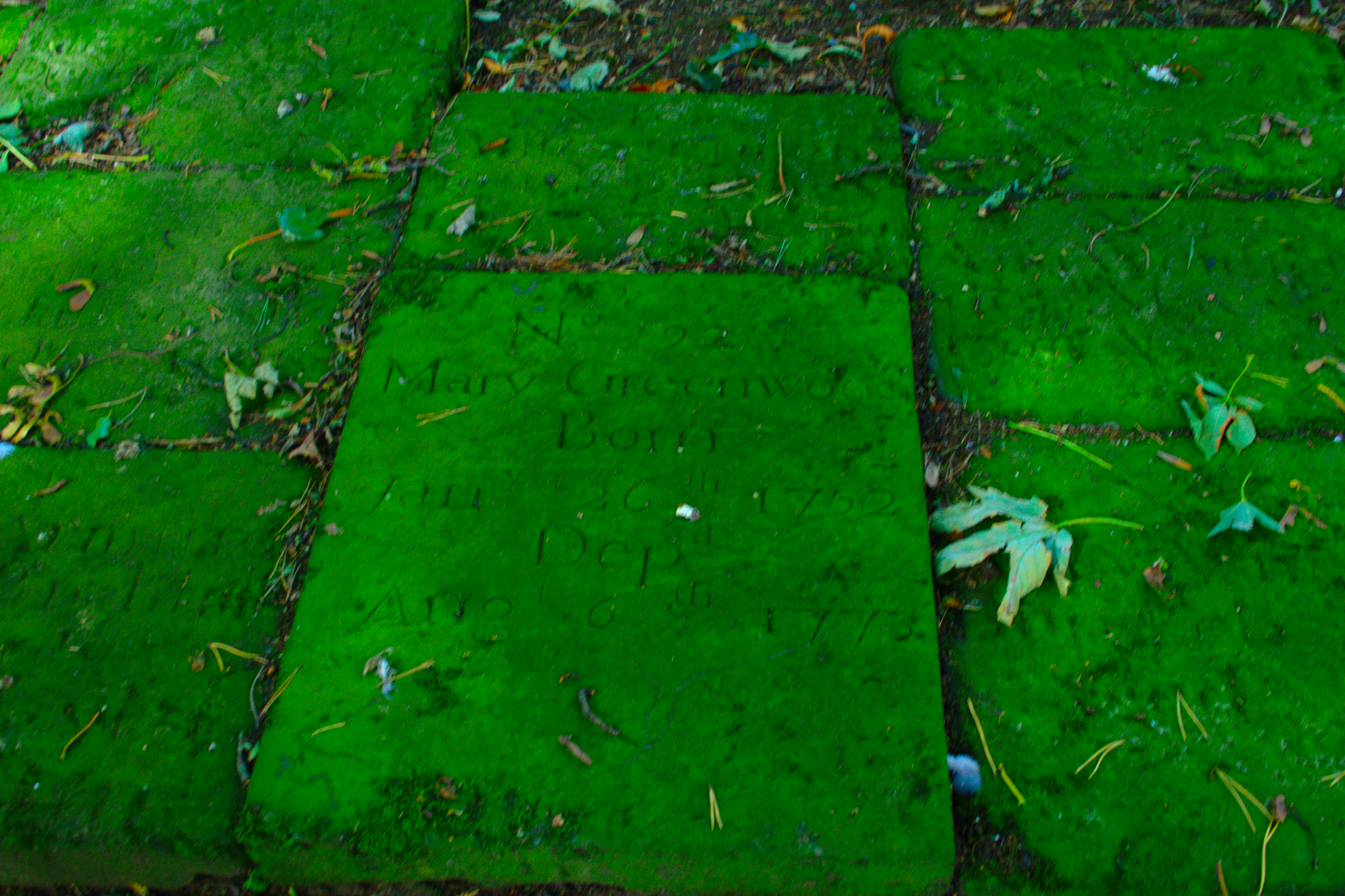
Mary Greenwoord was buried in Gracehill in County Antrim in 1752. Her gravestone is identical in style to hundreds of others irrespective of their gender or former status

Friedensthal Moravian Church in Christiansted in the United States Virgin Islands, founded in 1755

The modern Moravian Church has over 1.1 million members worldwide.

The motto of the Moravian Church is: "In essentials, unity; in nonessentials, liberty; and in all things, love".

== Organization ==
=== Provinces ===
For its global work, the Church is organised into Unity Provinces, Mission Provinces and Mission Areas and four regions of Africa, Caribbean and Latin America, Northern America, and Europe. The categorisation is based on the level of independence of the province. Unity Province implies a total level of independence, Mission Province implies a partial level of supervision from a Unity Province, and Mission Area implies full supervision by a Unity Province. (The links below connect to articles about the history of the church in specific provinces after 1732, where written.)

In the Czech Republic and Honduras splits occurred within the churches after charismatic revivals; non-charismatic minorities formed their own bodies, but both sides remained connected to the international church. The minority communities are listed as "mission provinces".

==== Membership ====
Provinces (year of foundation) or mission area	Congregations	Membership
Africa		907,830
Burundi (mission province)		40,000
Tanzania, North (2007)	25	3,910
Tanzania, East (2007)	56	28,510
Tanzania, Rukwa (1986)	60	66,410
Tanzania, South (1891)	170	203,000
Tanzania, South West (1978)	211	300,000
Tanzania, Lake Tanganyika (2005)	30	32,100
Tanzania, West (1897)	61	104,000
Zambia (1989)	17	5,210
South Africa (1792/1737)	87	98,000
Congo/DR Congo (2005)	80	21,500
Malawi (2007)	10	5,190
Caribbean & Latin America		204,980
Costa Rica (1980/1941)	3	1,900
Guyana (1878/1835)		960
Honduras (1930)	85	34,450
Jamaica (1754)	65	8,100
Nicaragua (1849)	226	97,000
Suriname (1735)	67	30,000
Eastern West Indies (1732); Trinidad, Tobago, Barbados, Antigua, St. Kitts, and the Virgin Islands including St. Croix, St. John, St. Thomas, Tortola and Grenada	52	15,100
Honduras (Mission Province)		16,870
Cuba (1997) (Mission Province)		600
North America		39,150
Alaska (1885)	22	1,690
America (North) (1741/1735); Greenland, Canada and the Northern States of the US	89	20,530
America (South) (1753); Southern States of the USA	55	15,030
Labrador (1771/1752) (mission province)		1,900
Europe		20,180
European Continental (1727); Germany, the Netherlands, Denmark, Sweden, Switzerland, Albania, Estonia, Latvia	24	14,530
British (1742); Great Britain and Ireland	30	1,200
Czech Republic (1862/1457)	29	3,800
Czech Republic/Herrnhut Seniority (mission province)		650
Missions Areas; Belize, French Guiana, Garifuna, Haiti, Kenya, Northern India & Nepal, Rwanda, Zanzibar, Sierra Leone, Tanzania Kiwele Region, Kivu and Katanga in DR Congo, Tanzania Iringa Region; Tanzania Ruvuma/Njombe Region, Uganda, Peru		25,000
Total		1,112,120

Other areas with missions but that are not yet established as Provinces are:

- Star Mountain Rehabilitation Centre, Ramallah, Palestine – under the care of the European Continental Province. Work began among people with leprosy in 1867 at the Jesus-Hilfe (Jesus' help) home in Jerusalem, responsibility for which was taken over by the Israeli state. In 1980, the former leper home on Star Mountain was converted for use as a home for handicapped children of the Arab population.
- South Asia [North India (Ladakh, Dehradun, Delhi), Nepal, Assam, Manipur] – under the care of the British Province. Formerly the West Himalayan Province (1853) and designated a Unity Undertaking in 1967.

Tanzania is divided into seven provinces because of the size of country and the numbers of people in the church. The "Moravian Church in Tanzania" co-ordinates the work in the nation.

The lists above, except for some details given under 'Other areas', can be found in The Moravian Almanac.

Each province is governed by a synod, made up of representatives from each congregation plus ex officio members.

The Synod elects the Provincial Board (aka Provincial Elders' Conference or PEC) to be responsible for the work of the province and its international links between synods.

=== Districts ===
Many, but not all, of the provinces are divided into districts.

=== Congregations ===
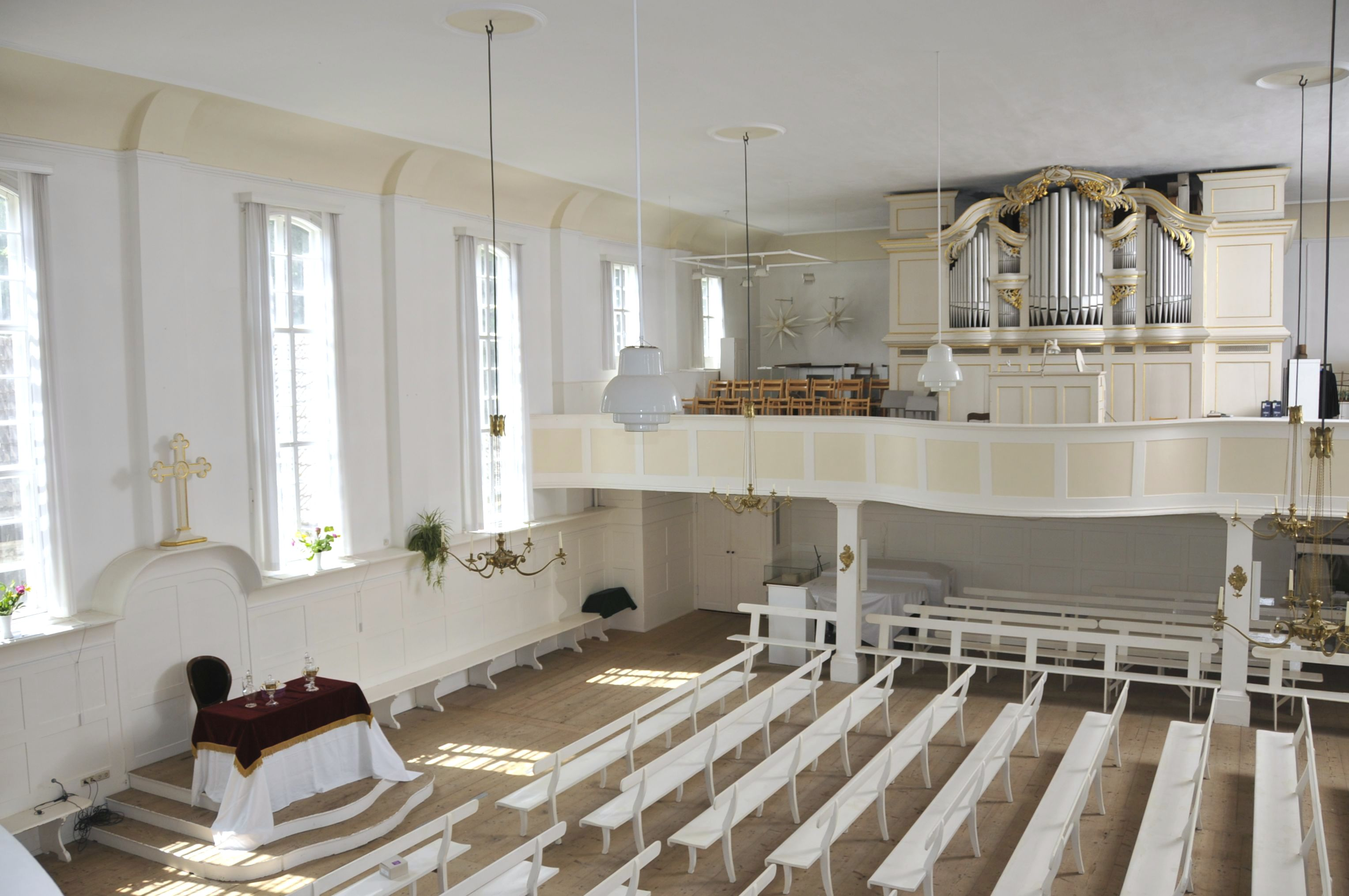
A Moravian church in Neudietendorf in Thuringia, Germany

Each congregation belongs to a district and has spiritual and financial responsibilities for work in its own area as well as provincially. The Congregation Council (all the members of a congregation) usually meets twice a year and annually elects the Joint Board of Elders and Trustees that acts as an executive.

In some provinces two or more congregations may be grouped into circuits, under the care of one minister.

=== Unity Synod ===
The Unity Synod meets every seven years and is attended by delegates from the different Unity Provinces and affiliated Provinces.

=== Unity Board ===
The Unity Board is made up of one member from each Provincial Board, and acts as an executive committee between Unity Synods. It meets three times between Synods but much of its work is done by correspondence and postal voting.

The President of the Unity Board (who is elected by the Board for two years and not allowed to serve for more than two terms) works from his/her own Provincial office. The Unity Business Administrator is an officer appointed by the Unity Board to administer the day-to-day affairs of the Unity through the office of the Unity.

== Orders of ministry ==
The highest order of ministry is that of a bishop. Bishops are elected by Provincial Synods usually through ecclesiastical ballot without nomination. In the Moravian Church, bishops do not have an administrative role but rather serve as spiritual leaders and pastors to the pastors. Bishops serve the worldwide Unity. The Moravian Church teaches that it has preserved apostolic succession.

In order to preserve the succession, three Bohemian Brethren were consecrated bishops by Bishop Stephen of Austria, a Waldensian bishop who had been ordained by a Roman Catholic bishop in 1434. These three consecrated bishops returned to Litice in Bohemia and then ordained other brothers, thereby preserving the historic episcopate.

== Beliefs ==
The Moravian Church teaches the necessity of the New Birth, piety, evangelism (especially missionary work), and doing good works. As such, the Moravian Brethren hold strongly that Christianity is a religion of the heart. It emphasizes the "greatness of Christ" and holds the Bible to be the "source of all religious truths". With regard to the New Birth, the Moravian Church holds that a personal conversion to Christianity is a joyful experience, in which the individual "accepts Christ as Lord" after which faith "daily grows inside the person." The Moravian Church, following the teaching of bishop Nicolaus Zinzendorf, holds that "We are sanctified wholly the moment we are justified, and are neither more nor less holy to the day of our death; entire sanctification and justification being in one and the same instant."

For Moravians, "Christ lived as a man because he wanted to provide a blueprint for future generations" and "a converted person could attempt to live in his image and daily become more like Jesus." The Moravian Church historically adheres to the position of Christian pacifism, evidenced in atrocities such as the Gnadenhutten massacre, where the Moravian Christian Indian Martyrs practiced nonresistance, singing hymns and praying to God until their execution.

In the Book of Order the several provinces of the Moravian Unity accept:

- The three Ecumenical Creeds: Apostles', Nicene, and Athanasian
- The first 21 articles of the Unaltered Augsburg Confession
- The Confession of the Unity of the Bohemian Brethren of 1535
- The Barmen Declaration of 1934
- The Small Catechism of Martin Luther
- The Synod of Berne (Berner Synodus) of 1532
- The Thirty-Nine Articles of the Church of England
- The Heidelberg Catechism

Moravian missions in which missionaries and the believers they ministered to lived together and adhered to Moravian practices, such as the following taught by David Zeisberger, John Heckewelder and John Ettwein:

1. We will know no other God, but the one only true God, who made us and all creatures, and came into this world in order to save sinners; to Him alone we will pray.
2. We will rest from work on the Lord's Day, and attend public service.
3. We will honor father and mother, and when they grow old and needy we will do for them what we can.
4. No person shall get leave to dwell with us until our teachers have given their consent, and the helpers (native assistants) have examined him.
5. We will have nothing to do with thieves, murderers, whoremongers, adulterers, or drunkards.
6. We will not take part in dances, sacrifices, heathenish festivals, or games.
7. We will use no Tschappish or witchcraft when hunting.
8. We renounce and abhor all tricks, lies and deceits of Satan.
9. We will be obedient to our teachers and to the helpers who are appointed to order our meetings in the town and fields.
10. We will not be idle nor scold, nor beat one another, nor tell lies.
11. Whoever injures the property of his neighbor shall make restitution.
12. A man shall have but one wife—shall love her and provide her and his children. A woman shall have but one husband, be obedient to him, care for her children, and be cleanly in all things.
13. We shall not admit rum, or any other intoxicating liquor into our towns. If strangers or traders bring intoxicating liquors, the helpers shall take it from them and not restore it until the owners are ready to leave the place.
14. No one shall contract debts with traders, or receive to sell for traders, unless the helpers give their consent.
15. Whoever goes hunting, or on a journey, shall inform the minister or stewards.
16. Young persons shall not marry without the consent of their parents, and minister.
17. Whenever the stewards or helpers appoint a time to make fences or perform other work for the public good, we will assist and do as we are bid.
18. Whenever corn is needed to entertain strangers, or sugar for love-feasts, we will freely contribute from our stores.
19. We will not go to war, and will not buy anything of warriors taken in war.

According to the Ground of the Unity of 1957, fundamental beliefs include but are not limited to:

- The Holy Trinity: the Father, the Son or Logos/Word, and the Holy Spirit.
- The Fatherhood of God
- God's Love for fallen humanity
- The Incarnation of God in the God/Man Jesus Christ
- Jesus' sacrificial death for the sinful rebellion of humanity
- Jesus' Resurrection, Ascension and Exaltation to the Right Hand of the Father
- Jesus' sending of the Holy Spirit to strengthen, sustain and empower believers
- Jesus' eventual return, in majesty, to judge the living and the dead
- The Kingdom of Christ shall never end
- There is one Baptism for the forgiveness of sins. Rebaptism is not allowed.
- Infants are baptized most commonly, but all forms of baptism are accepted (infant or adult; pouring, sprinkling or immersion).
- Moravian doctrine teaches that the Body and Blood of Christ are present in Holy Communion. Without seeking to explain the "Mode" or the "How" of the Presence of Jesus' Body and Blood in the Eucharist, they teach a sacramental union whereby with the Bread and the Wine the Body and Blood are also received. Cf. the "Easter Morning Litany" of the Moravian Church, a statement of faith, in the Moravian Book of Worship, p. 85.

These tenets of classical Christianity are not unique to the Moravian Church. The emphasis in both the Ancient Unity and the Renewed Unity is on Christian living and the fellowship of believers as a true witness to a vibrant Christian Faith.

=== Spirit of the Moravian Church ===
The Moravian Church is part of historic evangelicalism as its members strive to "actively seek to share the wonderful news of Christ with others". An account of the ethos of the Moravian Church is given by one of its British bishops, Clarence H. Shawe. In a lecture series delivered at the Moravian Theological Seminary in Bethlehem, Pennsylvania, Shawe described the Spirit of the Moravian Church as having five characteristics: simplicity, happiness, unintrusiveness, fellowship, and the ideal of service:

- Simplicity is a focus on the essentials of faith and a lack of interest in the niceties of doctrinal definition. Shawe quotes Zinzendorf's remark that "The Apostles say: 'We believe we have salvation through the grace of Jesus Christ....' If I can only teach a person that catechism I have made him a divinity scholar for all time" (Shawe, 1977, p. 9). From this simplicity flow secondary qualities of genuineness and practicality.
- Happiness is the natural and spontaneous response to God's free and gracious gift of salvation. Again Shawe quotes Zinzendorf: "There is a difference between a genuine Pietist and a genuine Moravian. The Pietist has his sin in the foreground and looks at the wounds of Jesus; the Moravian has the wounds in the forefront and looks from them upon his sin. The Pietist in his timidity is comforted by the wounds; the Moravian in his happiness is shamed by his sin" (p. 13).
- Unintrusiveness is based on the Moravian belief that God positively wills the existence of a variety of churches to cater for different spiritual needs. There is no need to win converts from other churches. The source of Christian unity is not legal form but everyone's heart-relationship with the Saviour.
- Fellowship is based on this heart-relationship. Shawe says: "The Moravian ideal has been to gather together kindred hearts... Where there are 'Christian hearts in love united', there fellowship is possible in spite of differences of intellect and intelligence, of thought, opinion, taste and outlook. [...] Fellowship [in Zinzendorf's time] meant not only a bridging of theological differences but also of social differences; the artisan and aristocrat were brought together as brothers and sat as equal members on the same committee" (pp. 21,22).
- The ideal of service entails happily having the attitude of a servant. This shows itself partly in faithful service in various roles within congregations but more importantly in service of the world "by the extension of the Kingdom of God". Historically, this has been evident in educational and especially missionary work. Shawe remarks that "none could give themselves more freely to the spread of the gospel than those Moravian emigrants who, by settling in Herrnhut [i.e., on Zinzendorf's estate], had gained release from suppression and persecution" (p. 26).

== Worship ==
- Hymnals
- Liturgy
- The Sacrament of the Holy Communion
- The Sacrament of Baptism, Infants and Adults
- Marriage
- Confirmation
- Christian Burial
- Ordination of Bishops, Presbyters and Deacons
- Consecration of church buildings and facilities

== Traditions ==
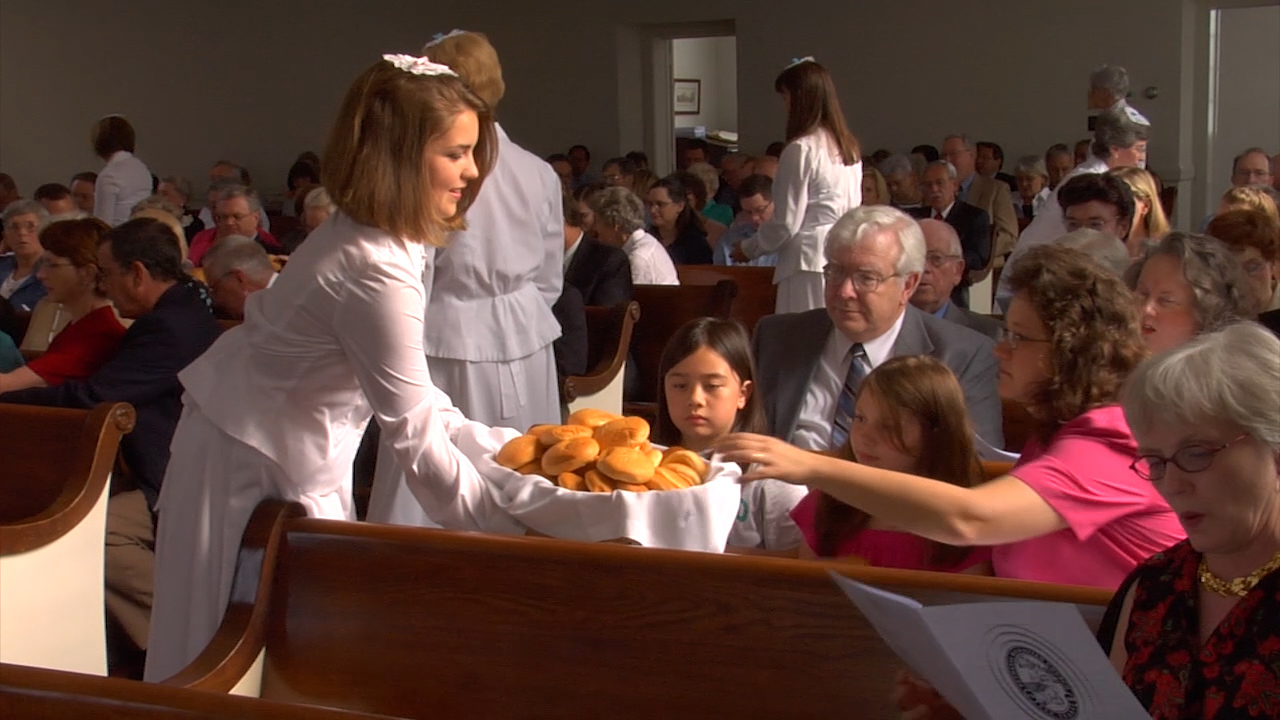
A Moravian diener serves bread to fellow members of her congregation during the celebration of a lovefeast.

- Lovefeast
- Feet washing
- Settlements
- Cup of Covenant
- Christingle (object) and Christingle service
- Hosanna Anthem
- Moravian Advent star
- Daily Watchwords, sometimes called Moravian Daily Texts
- Advent Wreath and Candles
- Passion Week/ Holy Week Reading Services
- God's Acre and Easter sunrise service
- Drawing of lots
- Music
- Watch Night Service on New Year's Eve
- Dead house

== Former traditions ==
- The drawing of "lots" in decision making
- Single Brethren's and Single Sisters' Houses: in the old original Settlement Congregations of Europe, Britain and the US, there were separate Houses caring for the spiritual and also temporal welfare of the Choirs of Single Brethren, Single Sisters, Widows.
- Wide/Short layout of church interiors
- Separate seating of sexes in churches
- Mission ships (the Harmony and the Snow Irene)
- Choirs: the word "Choir" has been used in the Moravian tradition since the 18th century to indicate a group of congregation members classified according to age and sex. Formerly there were in several congregations separate Houses caring for the spiritual and also temporal welfare of the Choirs of Single Brethren, Single Sisters, Widows.

== Uniformed and other organizations ==
- Boys' Brigade / Scouts
- Girls' Brigade / Guides / Upward & Onward
- Women's Fellowship
- Men's Fellowship
- Sunday School
- Young People's Missionary Association (YPMA)

== Ecumenical relations ==
The Moravian Church provinces are members individually of the World Council of Churches and the Lutheran World Federation. Most provinces are also members of their national councils of churches, such as the Evangelische Kirche in Deutschland (EKD) in Germany and the National Council of Churches of Christ in the US, the all African Council of Churches, the Caribbean Council of Churches, the Jamaica Council of Churches. The American Southern Province was instrumental in the founding of the North Carolina Council of Churches. The British Province is of the Churches Together in Britain and Ireland (formerly the British Council of Churches) and has an interim Communion agreement with the Church of England.

The two North American provinces are in full communion with the Evangelical Lutheran Church in America (ELCA). The Northern Province of the Moravian Church voted 18 June 2010 to enter into full communion with the Episcopal Church. The Moravian Church's Southern Province voted to enter into full communion with the Episcopal Church during its synod in September 2010. Each province can independently enter into full communion relationships.

The Northern and Southern Provinces of the Moravian Church in North America and the Presbyterian Church USA agreed to enter covenant partnership with one another. The two churches celebrated their agreement with a national service of worship on 5 June 2016 at the Covenant Presbyterian Church in Madison, Wisconsin. National leaders from both denominations participated in the service which included sharing the eucharist. In the 1980s there were discussions in England by which an agreement was created that would have created full communion between the Moravians, Presbyterians, Methodists, and the Church of England. The Presbyterians and Methodists would have accepted the Historic Episcopate, but since the Moravians already had this, they would have changed nothing. This agreement fell through, because the General Synod of the Church of England did not give approval.

One aspect of Moravian history and mission is the diaspora work in Germany and Eastern Europe, seeking to deepen and encourage the Christian life among members of the territorial churches, particularly in Poland and the Baltic states and throughout German-speaking lands. Count Zinzendorf's ideal was a fellowship of all Christians, regardless of denominational names, and the Moravian Brethren sought in the Diaspora not to convert people to the Moravian Church but to awaken the hearts of believers and make them better members of the churches to which they already belonged.

At first the object of suspicion, in the course of time the Moravian Diaspora workers became valued co-workers in eastern Europe. This Diaspora work suffered almost total destruction in World War II, but is still carried on within the territorial churches of Germany. With the restored independence of Estonia and Latvia, it was revealed that much of the Diaspora Work there had been kept alive in spite of occupation and annexation by the Soviet Union, which had held to the doctrine of state atheism.

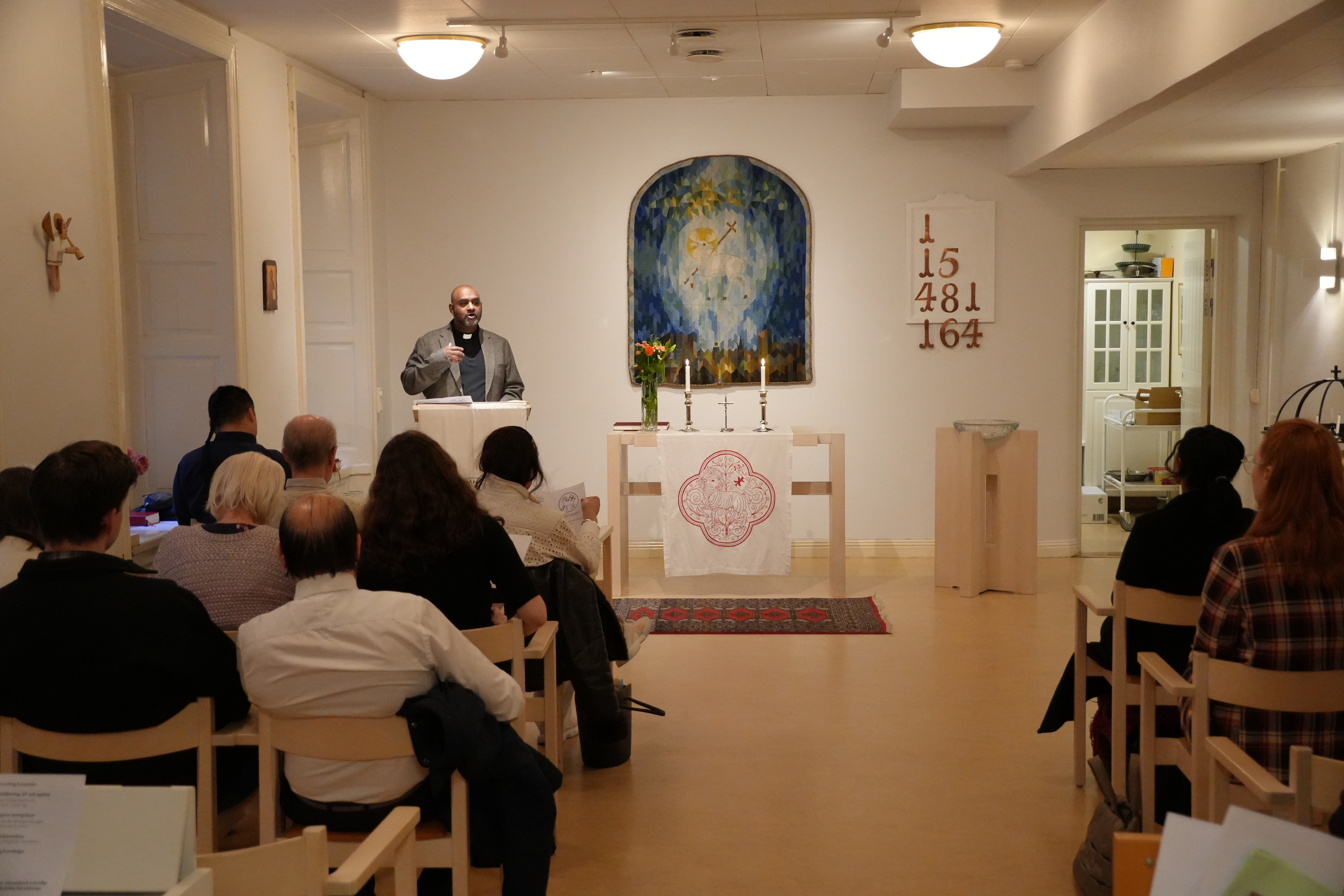
A service of worship in a Moravian congregation in Stockholm, Sweden. In Sweden, the two existing Moravian congregations are part of the Evangelical-Lutheran Church of Sweden.

In Sweden, the Lutheranism was the established state religion in the form of the Church of Sweden, when moravian thoughts and influence reached the country in the mid 1700s. Because of the conventicle act, membership and worship outside of the state church was forbidden, and both priests and lay people who were influenced by Moravian theology stayed within the Church of Sweden and formed small societies worshipping, rather than independent churches. Even after abolishing the laws and until this day the small Moravian movement has stayed within the Lutheran, now dis-established, Church of Sweden and therefore fully adhere to its Lutheran confessions. There are currently two Moravian congregations in the country, one in Stockholm and one in Gothenburg, both served by priests ordained in the Church of Sweden. There, a member of the movement is commonly called Herrnhutare, meaning "a Herrnhuter" while the movement in general is called Herrnhutism.

== Historical societies ==
- American North: the Moravian Historical Society and Historic Bethlehem (Pennsylvania)
- American South: the Wachovia Historical Society as well as Old Salem
- British: Moravian Church House, London
- Continental Province Verein für Geschichts- und Gegenwartsfragen der Brüdergemeine
- „Via exulantis", Suchdol nad Odrou (Zauchtenthal or Zauchtel), The Moravian Brethren's Museum. The permanent exposition of the exile of 280 inhabitants from Suchdol nad Odrou to Herrnhut in Saxony in the 18th century, where they renewed the Unity of the Brethren and then established missionary establishments in all parts of the world.

== Goals of the Moravian missions ==
- Moravians sought to unify the converts into "one people."
- Herrnhuter Bote (former title: der Brüderbote), the periodical of the Continental Province
- Unitas Fratrum, the publication of the Continental Province's historical society
- The Moravian Magazine, the publication of the North American Provinces
- The Moravian Voice, a publication of the Moravian Church in Jamaica
- The Moravian Messenger, periodical of the British Province
- Moravian History Magazine – published within the British Province but deals with the work worldwide.
- Journal of Moravian History – scholarly journal, published by the Moravian Archives in Bethlehem, Pennsylvania, and the Moravian Historical Society in Nazareth, Pennsylvania.

== See also ==
- English Covenant
- Minor Party (Unity of the Brethren)
- Old Salem
- Ronneburg, Hesse
- Schwarzenau Brethren, an Anabaptist denomination in the tradition of Radical Pietism
- University of Olomouc, established in 1573 as a Jesuit university in order to re-Catholicize the population of the March of Moravia
- Gracehill, a Moravian village in Northern Ireland which was awarded UNESCO World Heritage status in 2024

== General and cited references ==
- Church of England & the Moravian Church in Great Britain and Ireland, Anglican-Moravian Conversations: The Fetter Lane Common Statement with Essays in Moravian and Anglican History (1996)
- Engel, Katherine Carte. Religion and Profit: Moravians in Early America (2010)
- Fogleman, Aaron Spencer. Jesus Is Female: Moravians and the Challenge of Radical Religion in Early America (2007)
- Freeman, Arthur J. An Ecumenical Theology of the Heart: The Theology of Count Nicholas Ludwig von Zinzendorf (1998)
- Fries, Adelaide. Records of the Moravians in North Carolina (1917)
- Fries, Adelaide. The Moravians in Georgia, 1735–1740 at Project Gutenberg
- Gollin, Gilliam Lindt. Moravians in Two Worlds (1967)
- Hamilton, J. Taylor, and Hamilton, Kenneth G. History of the Moravian Church: The Renewed Unitas Fratrum 1722–1957 (1967)
- Hutton, J. E. A History of the Moravian Church (1909)
- Hutton, J. E. A History of the Moravian Missions (1922)
- Jarvis, Dale Gilbert. "The Moravian Dead Houses of Labrador, Canada", Communal Societies 21 (2001): 61–77.
- Langton; Edward. History of the Moravian Church: The Story of the First International Protestant Church (1956)
- Lewis, A. J. Zinzendorf the Ecumenical Pioneer (1962)
- Linyard, Fred, and Tovey, Phillip. Moravian Worship (Grove Worship Series No 129, UK), 1994
- Peucker, Paul. A Time of Sifting: Mystical Marriage and the Crisis of Moravian Piety in the Eighteenth Century. University Park, Penn.: Pennsylvania State University Press, 2015.
- Podmore, Colin. The Moravian Church in England 1728–1760 (1998)
- Rican, Rudolf. The History of the Unity of the Brethren (trans. by C. Daniel Crews) (1992)
- Shawe, C. H. The Spirit of the Moravian Church (1977)
- Teich, Mikulas, ed., Bohemia in History, Cambridge University Press, 1998, p. 384
- Tillman, Benjamin; Imprints on Native Lands: The Miskito-Moravian Settlement Landscape in Honduras; Tucson 2011 (University of Arizona Press)
- Weber, Julie Tomberlin (trans.) and Atwood, Craig D. (ed.) A Collection of Sermons from Zinzendorf's Pennsylvania Journey (1741-2; 2001)
- Weinlick, John R. Count Zinzendorf: The Story of his Life and Leadership in the Renewed Moravian Church (1984)
- Zinzendorf, Nicholaus Ludwig. Nine Public Lectures on Important Subjects in Religion (1746; translated and edited by George W. Forell 1973)
