= David Nitschmann der Bischof =

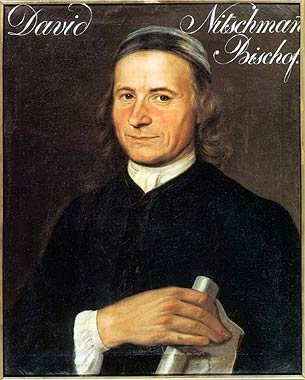
David Nitschmann the Bishop

Nitschmann's tombstone in Bethlehem

David Nitschmann der Bischof (David Nitschmann the Bishop, 21 December 1696, Suchdol nad Odrou, Moravia – 8 October 1772, Bethlehem, Pennsylvania) was with Johann Leonhard Dober one of the two first missionaries of the Moravian Brethren in the West Indies in 1732, and the first Bishop of the Renewed Unitas Fratrum, the Moravian Church.

== Life ==
In 1735 in Berlin, he was consecrated the first Bishop of the Renewed Unitas Fratrum, Moravians by Daniel Ernst Jablonski, grandson of John Amos Comenius, the last Bishop of the Ancient Unitas Fratrum.

He landed at Philadelphia, in 1741 and was instrumental in the founding of Bethlehem, Pennsylvania, where he died in 1772.

Nitschmann traveled with John Wesley and helped to found the mission at Bethlehem.
